= 1955 =

1955 in various calendars
- Gregorian calendar: 1955; MCMLV
- Ab urbe condita: 2708
- Armenian calendar: 1404; ԹՎ ՌՆԴ
- Assyrian calendar: 6705
- Baháʼí calendar: 111–112
- Balinese saka calendar: 1876–1877
- Bengali calendar: 1361–1362
- Berber calendar: 2905
- British Regnal year: 3 Eliz. 2 – 4 Eliz. 2
- Buddhist calendar: 2499
- Burmese calendar: 1317
- Byzantine calendar: 7463–7464
- Chinese calendar: 甲午年 (Wood Horse); 4652 or 4445 — to — 乙未年 (Wood Goat); 4653 or 4446
- Coptic calendar: 1671–1672
- Discordian calendar: 3121
- Ethiopian calendar: 1947–1948
- Hebrew calendar: 5715–5716
- Hindu calendars
- Vikram Samvat: 2011–2012
- Shaka Samvat: 1876–1877
- Kali Yuga: 5055–5056
- Holocene calendar: 11955
- Igbo calendar: 955–956
- Iranian calendar: 1333–1334
- Islamic calendar: 1374–1375
- Japanese calendar: Shōwa 30 (昭和３０年)
- Javanese calendar: 1886–1887
- Juche calendar: 44
- Julian calendar: Gregorian minus 13 days
- Korean calendar: 4288
- Minguo calendar: ROC 44 民國44年
- Nanakshahi calendar: 487
- Thai solar calendar: 2498
- Tibetan calendar: ཤིང་ཕོ་རྟ་ལོ་ (male Wood-Horse); 2081 or 1700 or 928 — to — ཤིང་མོ་ལུག་ལོ་ (female Wood-Sheep); 2082 or 1701 or 929

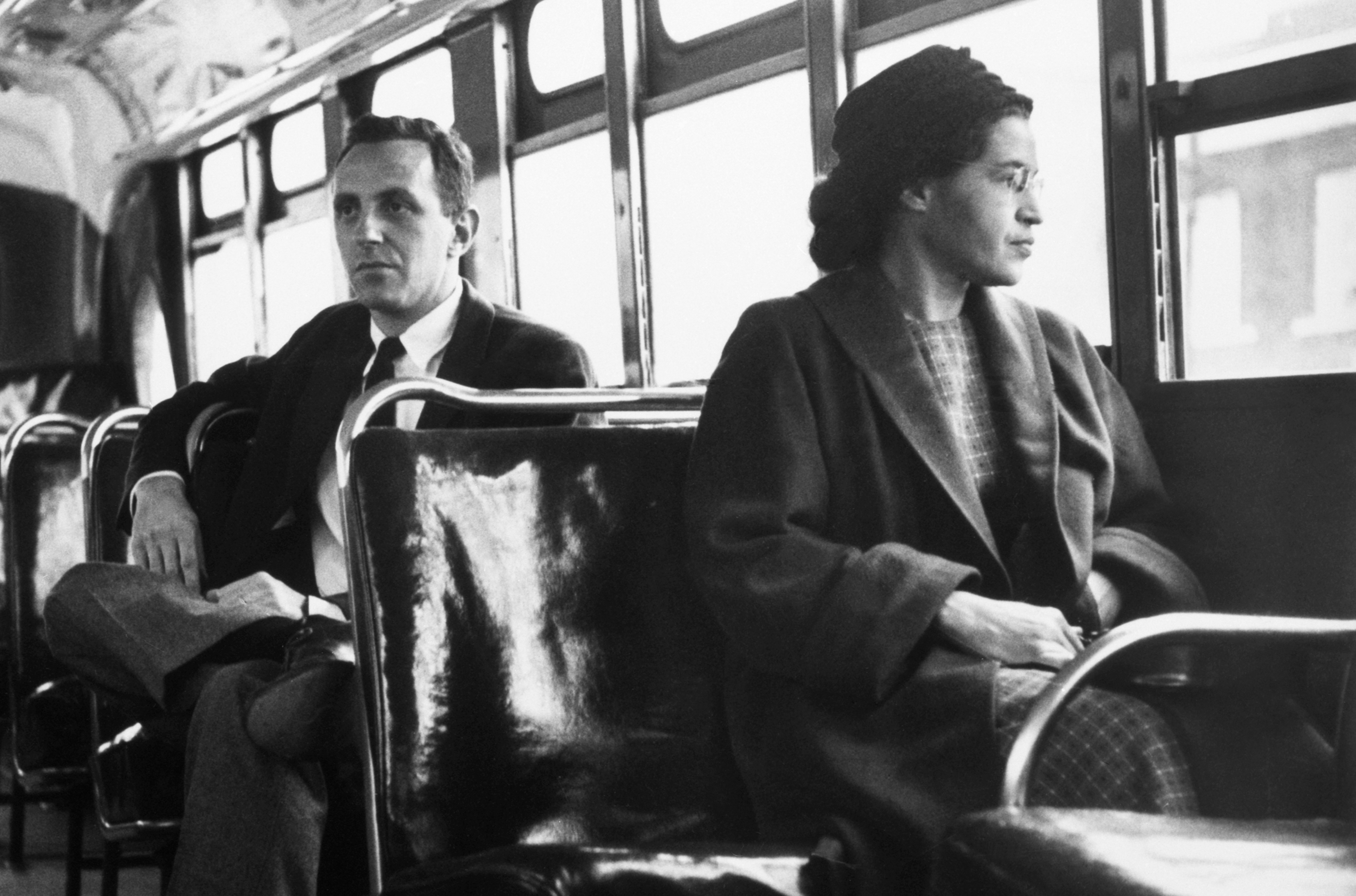
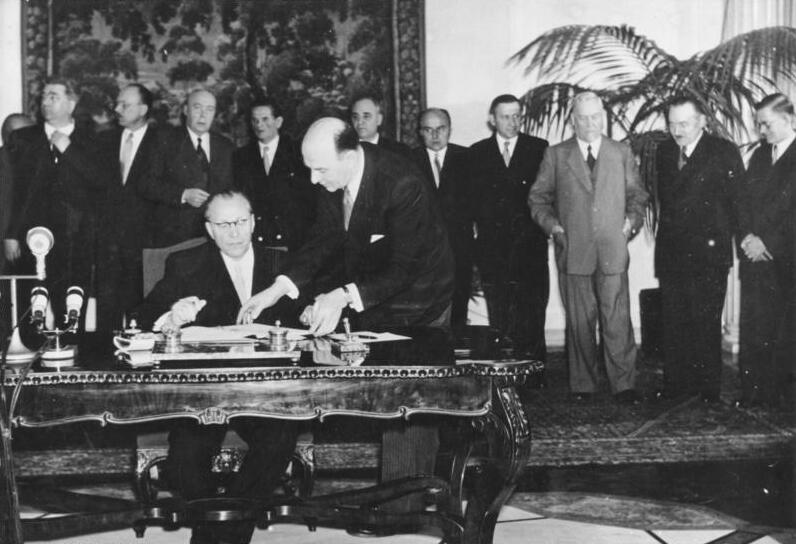
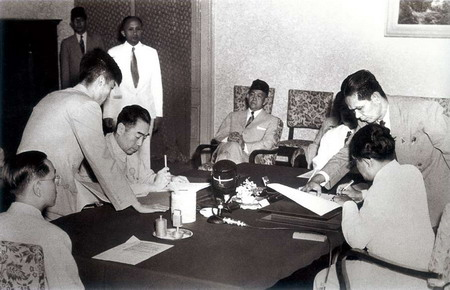
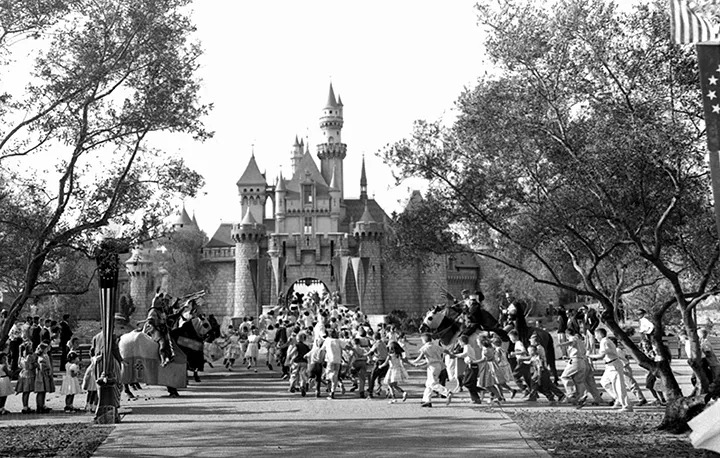
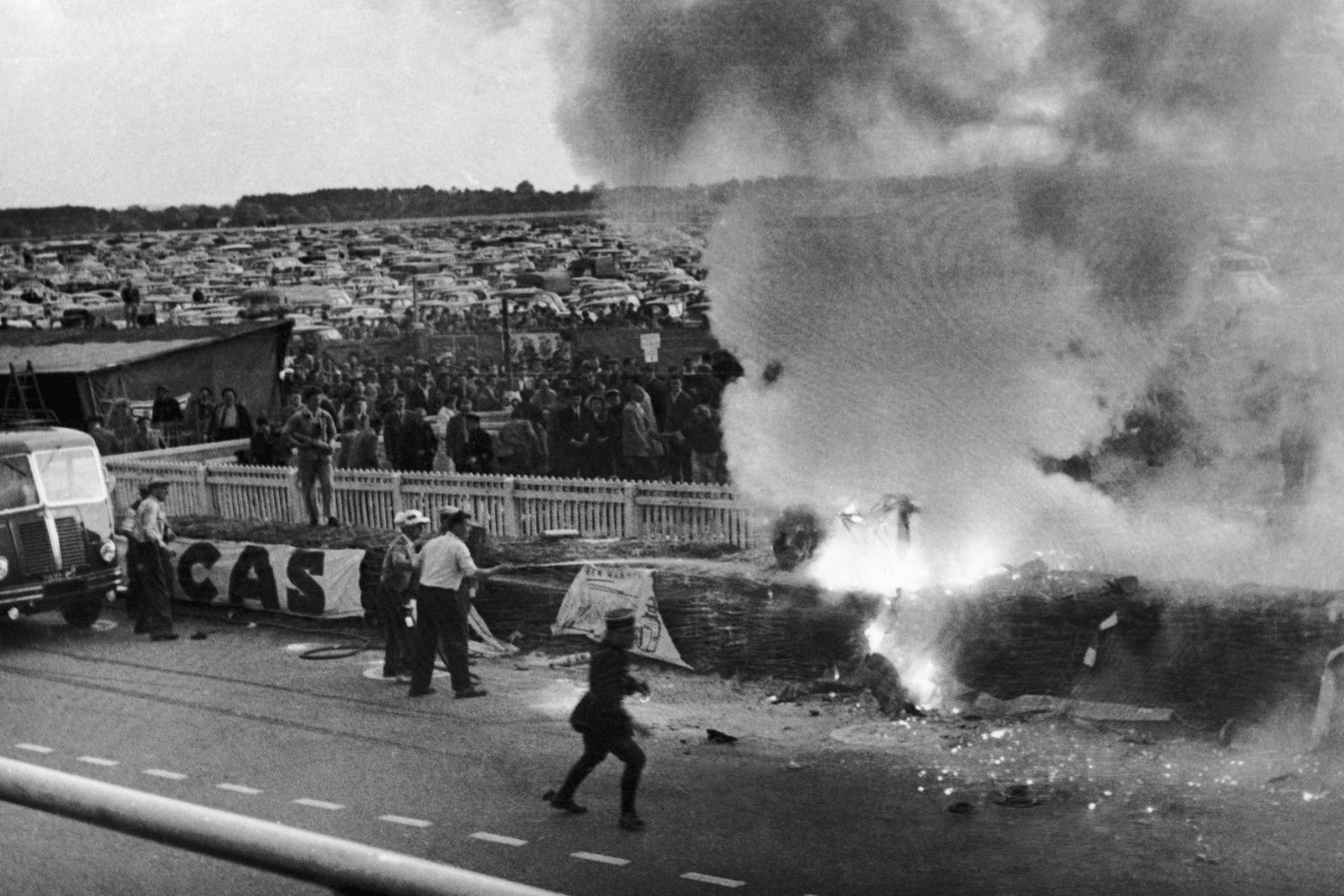
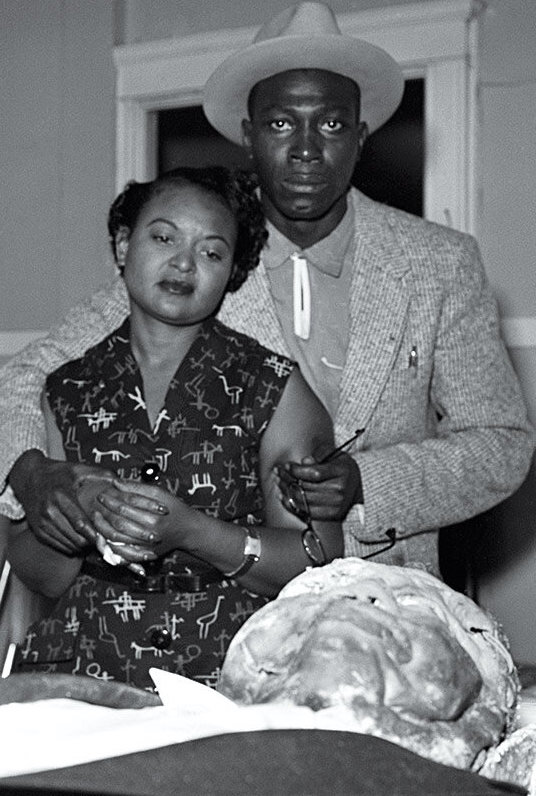
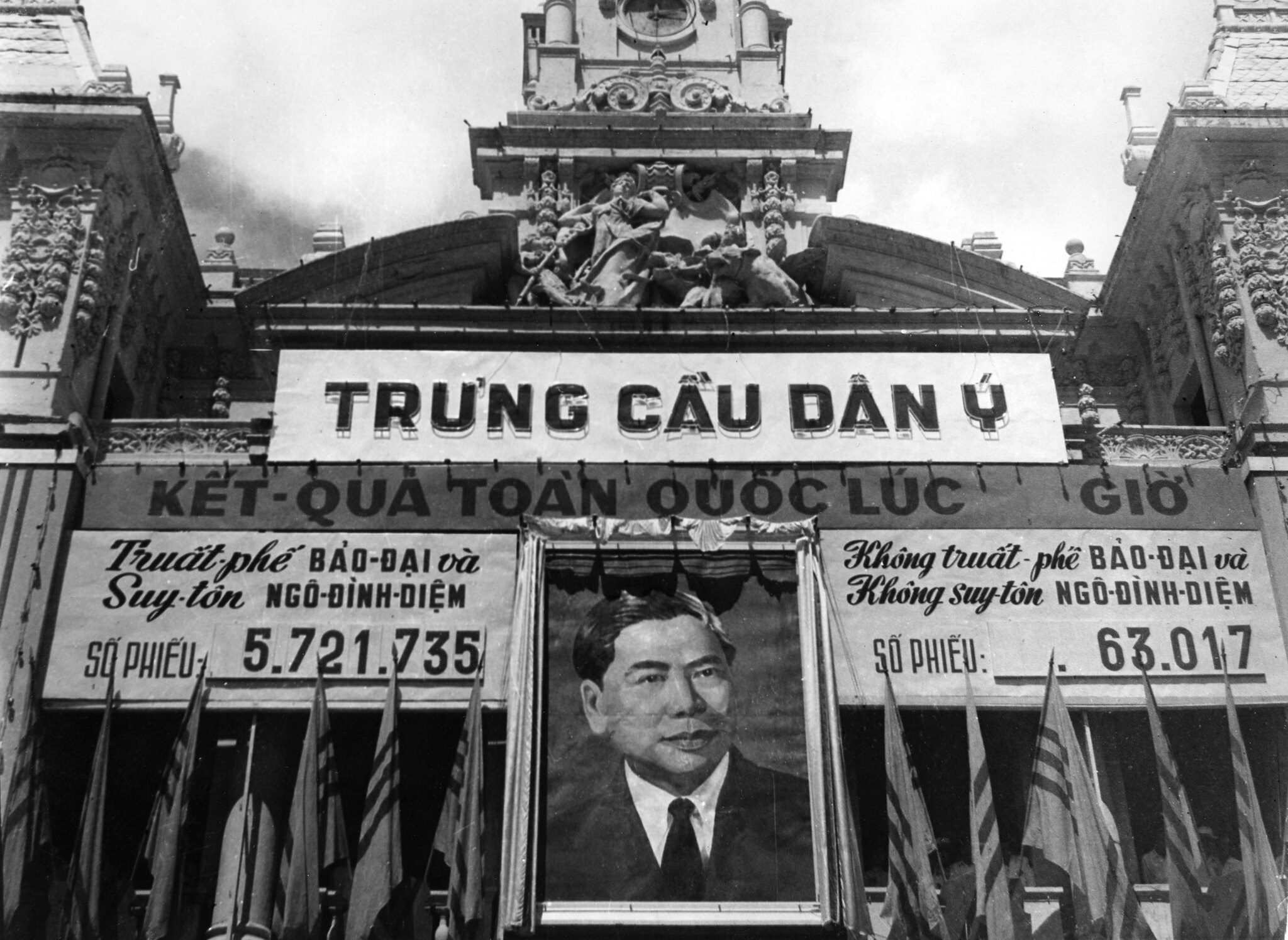
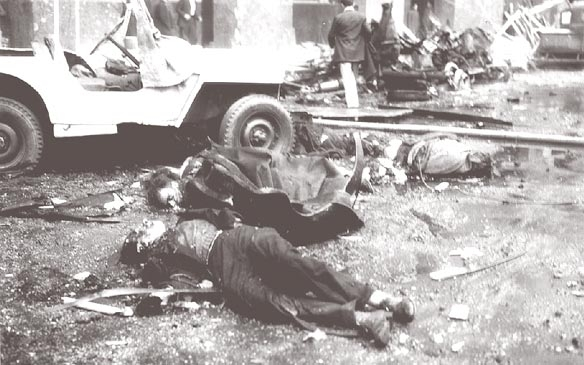
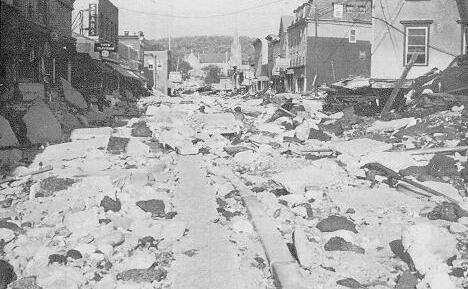
From top to bottom, left to right: The Montgomery bus boycott begins after Rosa Parks’ arrest; the Warsaw Pact forms the Eastern Bloc; the Bandung Conference unites Asian and African nations; Disneyland opens in Anaheim, California; the 1955 Le Mans disaster kills over 80 spectators; the Lynching of Emmett Till shocks the U.S.; the 1955 State of Vietnam referendum makes Ngô Đình Diệm president; the Bombing of Plaza de Mayo reveals Argentina’s unrest; and Hurricane Diane causes major U.S. flooding.

1955 (MCMLV) was a common year starting on Saturday of the Gregorian calendar, the 1955th year of the Common Era (CE) and Anno Domini (AD) designations, the 955th year of the 2nd millennium, the 55th year of the 20th century, and the 6th year of the 1950s decade.

== Events ==
=== January ===
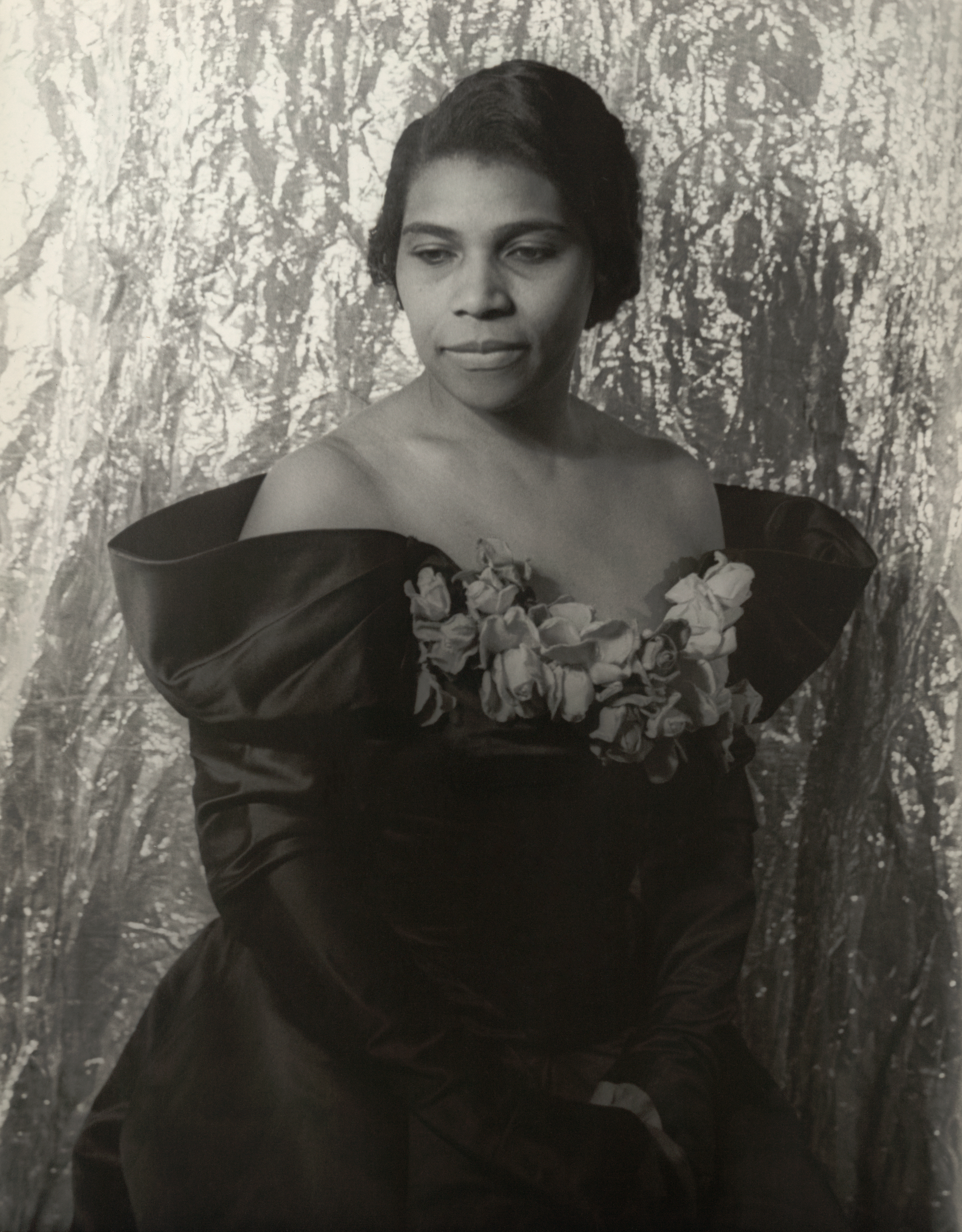
January 7: Marian Anderson at the Met

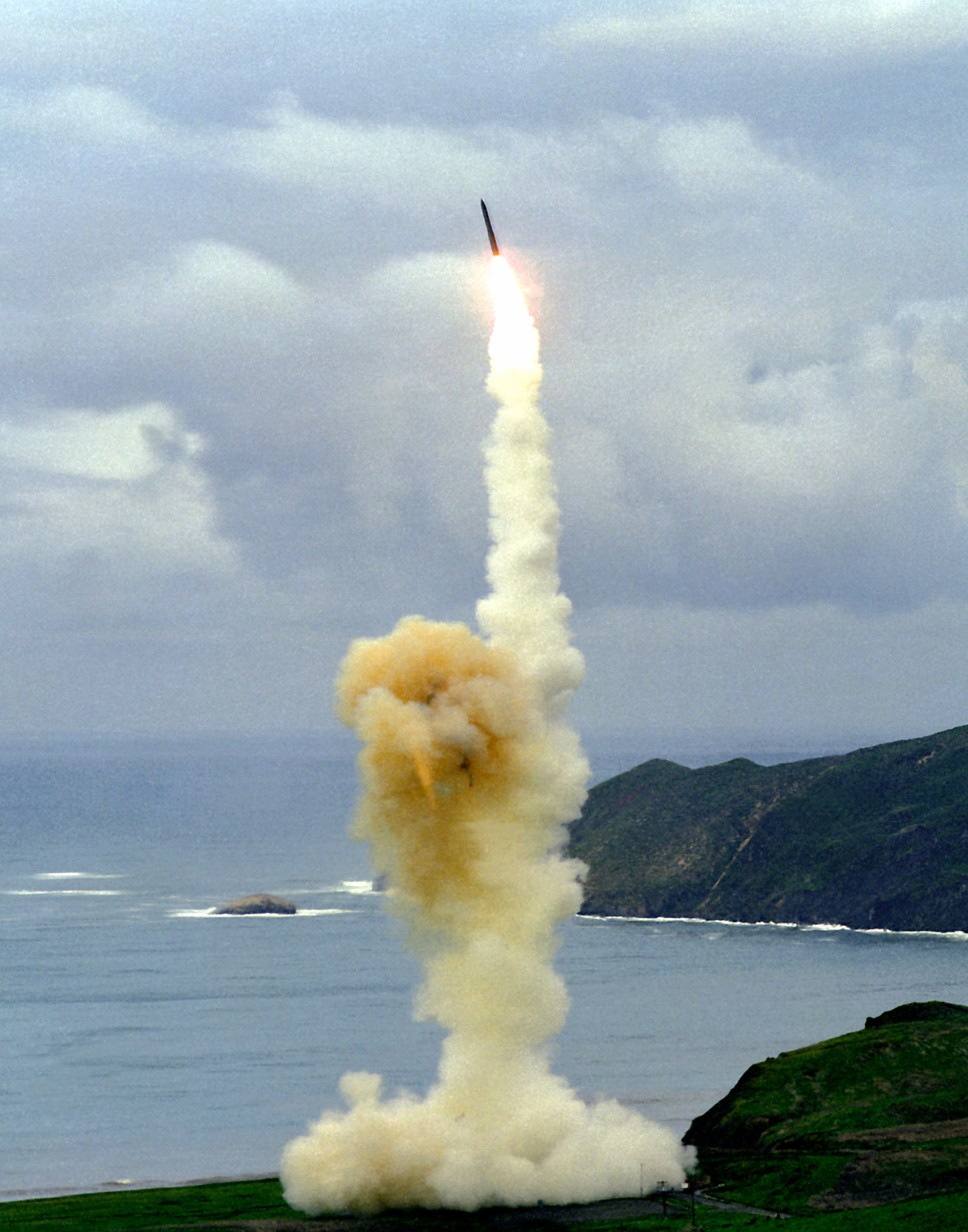
January 22: ICBM

- January 3 – José Ramón Guizado becomes president of Panama.
- January 7 – Marian Anderson is the first African-American singer to perform at the Metropolitan Opera in New York City.
- January 17 – USS Nautilus, the first nuclear-powered submarine, puts to sea for the first time, from Groton, Connecticut.
- January 18–20 – Battle of Yijiangshan Islands: The Chinese Communist People's Liberation Army seizes the islands from the Republic of China (Taiwan).
- January 22 – In the United States, The Pentagon announces a plan to develop intercontinental ballistic missiles (ICBMs), armed with nuclear weapons.
- January 23 – The Sutton Coldfield rail crash kills 17, near Birmingham, England.
- January 25 – The Presidium of the Supreme Soviet of the Soviet Union announces the end of the war between the USSR and Germany, which began during World War II in 1941.
- January 28 – The United States Congress authorizes President Dwight D. Eisenhower to use force to protect Taiwan from the People's Republic of China.

=== February ===
- February 10 – The United States Seventh Fleet helps the Republic of China evacuate the Chinese Nationalist army and residents from the Tachen Islands to Taiwan.
- February 16 – Nearly 100 die in a fire at a home for the elderly in Yokohama, Japan.
- February 19 – The Southeast Asia Treaty Organization (SEATO) is established, at a meeting in Bangkok.
- February 22 – In Chicago's Democratic primary, Mayor Martin H. Kennelly loses to the head of the Cook County Democratic Party, Richard J. Daley, 364,839 to 264,077.
- February 24 – The Baghdad Pact (CENTO), originally known as Middle East Treaty Organization (METO), is signed between Iraq and Turkey.

=== March ===
- March 2 – Claudette Colvin, a 15-year-old African-American girl, refuses to give up her seat on a bus in Montgomery, Alabama, to a white woman after the driver demands it. She is carried off the bus backwards, while being kicked, handcuffed and harassed on the way to the police station. She becomes a plaintiff in Browder v. Gayle (1956), which rules bus segregation to be unconstitutional.
- March 20 – The movie adaptation of Evan Hunter's novel Blackboard Jungle premieres in the United States, featuring the famous single "Rock Around the Clock" by Bill Haley & His Comets. Teenagers jump from their seats to dance to the song.

=== April ===
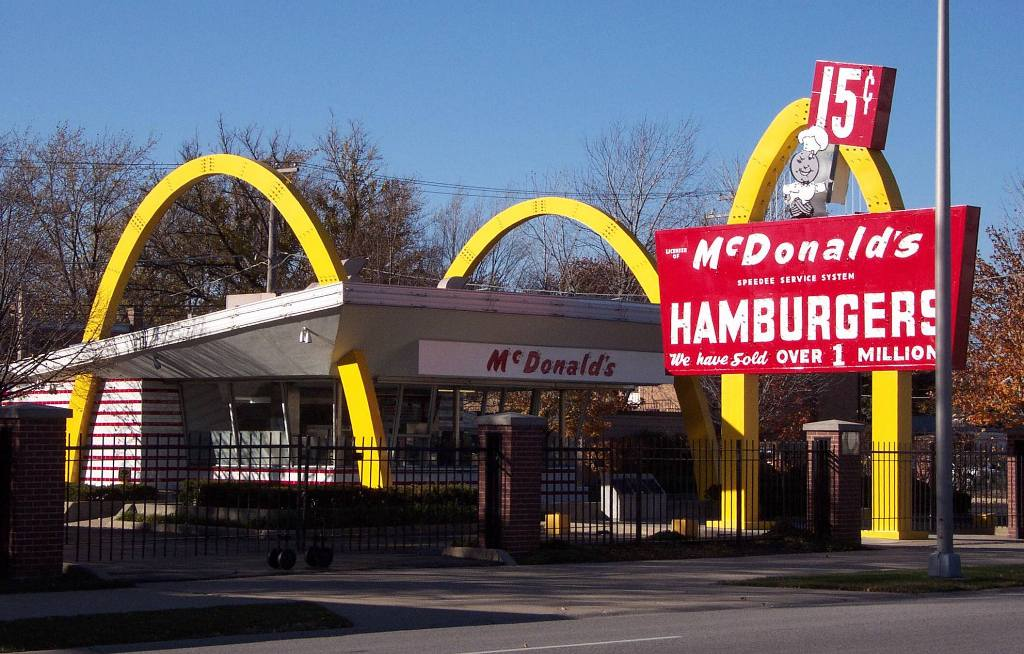
April 15: First McDonald's opens

- April 1 – EOKA starts a resistance campaign against British rule in the Crown colony of Cyprus.
- April 5 – Winston Churchill resigns as Prime Minister of the United Kingdom, due to ill-health, at the age of 80.
- April 6 – Anthony Eden becomes Prime Minister of the United Kingdom.
- April 11
  - The Taiwanese Kuomintang put a bomb on the airplane Kashmir Princess, killing 16 but failing to assassinate the People's Republic of China leader, Zhou Enlai.
  - Taekwondo, a form of Korean martial arts, is officially recognized in South Korea. A board convened by General Choi Hong Hi, including master instructors, historians and societal leaders, officially adopts the name Taekwon-Do for the unified Korean martial art.
- April 12 – The Salk polio vaccine, having passed large-scale trials earlier in the United States, receives full approval by the Food and Drug Administration.
- April 15 – The first franchised McDonald's restaurant is opened by Ray Kroc, in Des Plaines, Illinois.
- April 16 – The Burma–Japan Peace Treaty, signed in Rangoon on November 5, 1954, comes into effect, formally ending a state of war between the two countries.
- April 17 – Imre Nagy, the communist Premier of Hungary, is ousted for being too moderate.
- April 18–24 – The Asian-African Conference is held in Bandung, Indonesia.

=== May ===
- May 5 – West Germany becomes a sovereign country, recognized by Western countries such as France, the United Kingdom, Canada and the United States.
- May 6 – The Western European Union Charter becomes effective.
- May 7 – Newcastle United F.C. beat Manchester City F.C. 3–1 to win the 1955 FA Cup final in English Association football.
- May 9 – West Germany joins the North Atlantic Treaty Organization (NATO).
- May 11 – Japanese National Railways' ferry Shiun Maru sinks after a collision with sister ship Uko Maru, in thick fog off Takamatsu, Shikoku, in the Seto Inland Sea of Japan; 166 passengers (many children) and 2 crew members are killed. This event is influential in plans to construct the Akashi Kaikyō Bridge (built 1986–98).
- May 14 – Eight Communist Bloc countries, including the Soviet Union, sign a mutual defence treaty in Warsaw, Poland, that is called the Warsaw Pact (it will be dissolved in 1991).
- May 15
  - The Austrian State Treaty, which restores Austria's national sovereignty, is concluded between the 4 occupying powers following World War II (the United Kingdom, the United States, the Soviet Union, and France) and Austria, setting it up as a neutral country.
  - Lionel Terray and Jean Couzy become the first people to reach the summit of Makalu, the fifth-highest mountain in the world, on the 1955 French Makalu expedition. The entire team of climbers reaches the summit over the next two days.
- May 18 – Free movement of residents between North and South Vietnam ends.
- May 25 – Joe Brown and George Band are the first to climb Kangchenjunga in the Himalayas, as part of the British Kangchenjunga expedition led by Charles Evans.

=== June ===
- June 7 – The television quiz program The $64,000 Question premieres on CBS-TV in the United States, with Hal March as the host.
- June 11 – Le Mans disaster: Eighty-three people are killed when two racing cars collide in the 1955 24 Hours of Le Mans.
- June 13 – Mir mine, the first diamond mine in the Soviet Union, is discovered.
- June 26 – The Freedom Charter of the anti-apartheid South African Congress Alliance is adopted, at a Congress of the People in Kliptown.
- June 30 – The Simonstown Agreement provides for control of the naval base at Simon's Town in the Union of South Africa to transfer from the British Royal Navy to the South African Navy.

=== July ===
- July 7 – The New Zealand Special Air Service is formed.
- July 13 – Ruth Ellis is hanged for murder in London, becoming the last woman ever to be executed in the United Kingdom.
- July 17
  - The Disneyland theme park opens in Anaheim, California, an event broadcast on the American Broadcasting Company television network.
  - The first atomic-generated electrical power is sold commercially, partially powering Arco, Idaho, from the U.S. National Reactor Testing Station; on July 18, Schenectady, New York, receives power from a prototype nuclear submarine reactor at Knolls Atomic Power Laboratory.
- July 18 – Illinois Governor William Stratton signs the Loyalty Oath Act, that mandates all public employees take a loyalty oath to the State of Illinois and the United States or lose their jobs.
- July 18–23 – Geneva Summit between the United States, Soviet Union, United Kingdom and France.
- July 27 – El Al Flight 402 from Vienna (Austria) to Tel Aviv, via Istanbul, is shot down over Bulgaria. All 58 passengers and crewmen aboard the Lockheed Constellation are killed.
- July 28 – The first Interlingua Congress is held in Tours, France, leading to the foundation of the Union Mundial pro Interlingua.

=== August ===
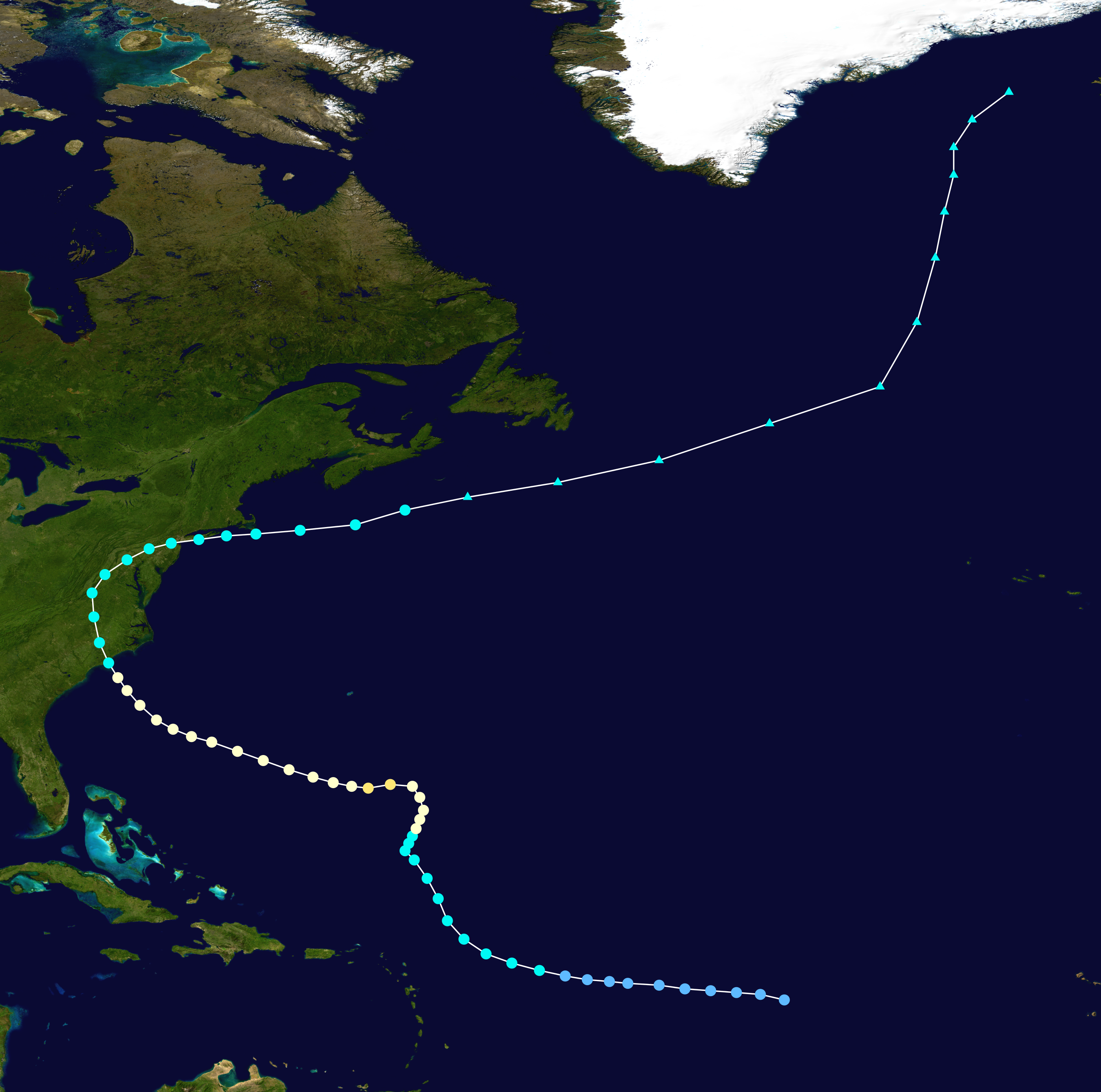
August 19: Hurricane Diane

- August 1 – The prototype Lockheed U-2 reconnaissance aircraft first flies, in Nevada.
- August 18
  - The First Sudanese Civil War begins.
  - The first meeting of the Organization of Central American States (Spanish: Organización de Estados Centroamericanos, ODECA) is held, in Antigua Guatemala.
- August 19 – Hurricane Diane hits the northeastern United States, killing over 200 people and causing over $1 billion in damage.
- August 20 – Hundreds of people are killed in anti-French rioting in Morocco and Algeria.
- August 22 – Eleven schoolchildren are killed when their school bus is hit by a freight train in Spring City, Tennessee.
- August 26 – Satyajit Ray's film Pather Panchali is released in India.
- August 28 – Black 14-year-old Emmett Till is lynched and shot in the head for allegedly whistling at a white woman in Money, Mississippi; his white murderers, Roy Bryant and J. W. Milam, are acquitted by an all-white jury.

=== September ===
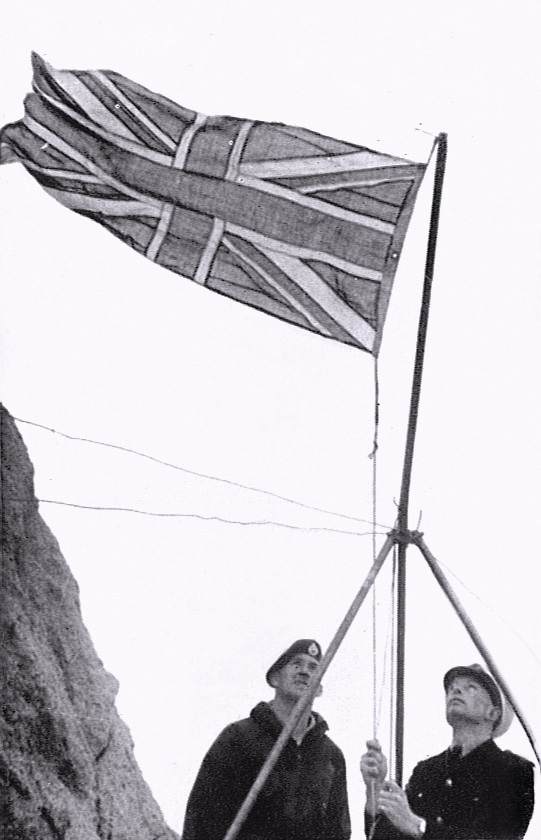
September 18: Britain annexes Rockall

- September 2 – Under the guidance of Dr. Humphry Osmond, Christopher Mayhew ingests 400 mg of mescaline hydrochloride and allows himself to be filmed as part of a Panorama special for BBC TV in the U.K. that is never broadcast.
- September 3 – Little Richard records "Tutti Frutti" in New Orleans; it is released in October.
- September 6 – Istanbul pogrom: Istanbul's Greek minority is the target of a government-sponsored pogrom.
- September 10 – The long-running Western television series Gunsmoke debuts, on the CBS network in the United States.
- September 14 – Pope Pius XII elevates many of the apostolic vicariates in Africa to Metropolitan Archdioceses.
- September 15 – Vladimir Nabokov's controversial novel Lolita is published in Paris, by Olympia Press.
- September 16
  - The military coup to unseat President Juan Perón of Argentina is launched at midnight.
  - A Soviet Navy Zulu-class submarine becomes the first to launch a ballistic missile.
- September 18 – The United Kingdom formally annexes the uninhabited Atlantic island of Rockall.
- September 19–21 – President of Argentina Juan Perón is ousted in a military coup.
- September 19 – Hurricane Hilda kills about 200 people in Mexico.
- September 21–30 – Hurricane Janet, one of the strongest North Atlantic tropical cyclones on record, sweeps the Lesser Antilles and Mexico, causing more than 1,020 deaths.
- September 22 – Commercial television starts in the United Kingdom with the Independent Television Authority's first ITV franchises beginning broadcasting in London, ending the BBC monopoly.
- September 24
  - Dwight D. Eisenhower, president of the United States, suffers a coronary thrombosis while on vacation in Denver, Colorado. Vice President Nixon assumed administrative duties and presided over Cabinet and National Security Council meetings while Eisenhower recovers.
  - Founder of Swiss watchmaker Glycine Watch SA, Eugène Meylan, age 64, is murdered.
- September 30 – Actor James Dean is killed when his automobile collides with another car at a highway junction, near Cholame, California.

=== October ===
- October 4 – The Reverend Sun Myung Moon is released from prison in Seoul, South Korea.
- October 5 – Disneyland Hotel opens to the public in Anaheim, California.
- October 11 – 70-mm film for projection is introduced, with the theatrical release of Rodgers and Hammerstein's musical film, Oklahoma!.
- October 14 – The Organization of Central American States secretariat is inaugurated.
- October 26
  - After the last Allied troops have left Austria, and following the provisions of the Austrian Independence Treaty, the country declares its permanent neutrality.
  - Ngô Đình Diệm proclaims Vietnam to be a republic, with himself as its President (following the State of Vietnam referendum on October 23), and forms the Army of the Republic of Vietnam.
- October 29 – Soviet battleship Novorossiysk explodes at moorings in Sevastopol Bay, killing 608 (the Soviet Union's worst naval disaster to date).

=== November ===
October 26: Austria declares permanent neutrality

- November 1
  - Official start date of the Vietnam War between the Democratic Republic of Vietnam and Republic of Vietnam; the north is allied with the Viet Cong.
  - A time bomb explodes in the cargo hold of United Airlines Flight 629, a Douglas DC-6B, over Longmont, Colorado, killing all 39 passengers and 5 crew members on board.
- November 3 – The Rimutaka Tunnel opens on the New Zealand Railways, at 5.46 mi (8.79 km), the longest in the Southern Hemisphere at this time.
- November 15 – The Democratic Party of Japan and Japan Liberal Party merge to form the Japan Liberal Democratic Party, beginning the "1955 System".
- November 19 – C. Northcote Parkinson first propounds 'Parkinson's law', in The Economist.
- November 23 – The Cocos Islands in the Indian Ocean are transferred from British to Australian control.
- November 26 – The British Governor of Cyprus declares a state of emergency on the island.

=== December ===
- December 1 – In Montgomery, Alabama, Rosa Parks refuses to obey bus driver James F. Blake's order that she give up her seat to make room for a white passenger, and is arrested, leading to the Montgomery bus boycott.
- December 4 – The International Federation of Blood Donor Organizations is founded in Luxembourg.
- December 5
  - The American Federation of Labor and the Congress of Industrial Organizations merge, to become the AFL–CIO.
  - The Montgomery Improvement Association is formed in Montgomery, Alabama, by Dr. Martin Luther King Jr., and other Black ministers to coordinate the Montgomery bus boycott by Black people.
- December 9 – Adnan Menderes of DP forms the new government of Turkey (22nd government).
- December 10 – 1955 Australian federal election: Robert Menzies' Liberal/Country Coalition Government is re-elected with a substantially increased majority, defeating the Labor Party led by H. V. Evatt. This election comes in the immediate aftermath of the devastating split in the Labor Party, which leads to the formation of the Democratic Labor Party. The DLP will preference against Labor, and keep the Coalition in office until 1972.
- December 14 – Albania, Austria, Bulgaria, Cambodia, Finland, Hungary, Ireland, Italy, Jordan, Laos, Libya, Nepal, Portugal, Romania, Spain and Sri Lanka join the United Nations simultaneously, after several years of moratorium on admitting new members that began during the Korean War.
- December 19 – Australian comedian Barry Humphries first introduces his character Edna Everage on stage in Melbourne.
- December 20 – Cardiff is officially declared capital of Wales by the British Government.
- December 22 – American cytogeneticist Joe Hin Tjio discovers the correct number of human chromosomes, forty-six.
- December 31 – Austria becomes independent, under terms of the May 15 Austrian State Treaty.

=== World population ===
- World population: 2,755,823,000
  - Africa: 246,746,000
  - Asia: 1,541,947,000
  - Europe: 575,184,000
  - South America: 190,797,000
  - North America: 186,884,000
  - Oceania: 14,265,000

== Births ==
=== January ===
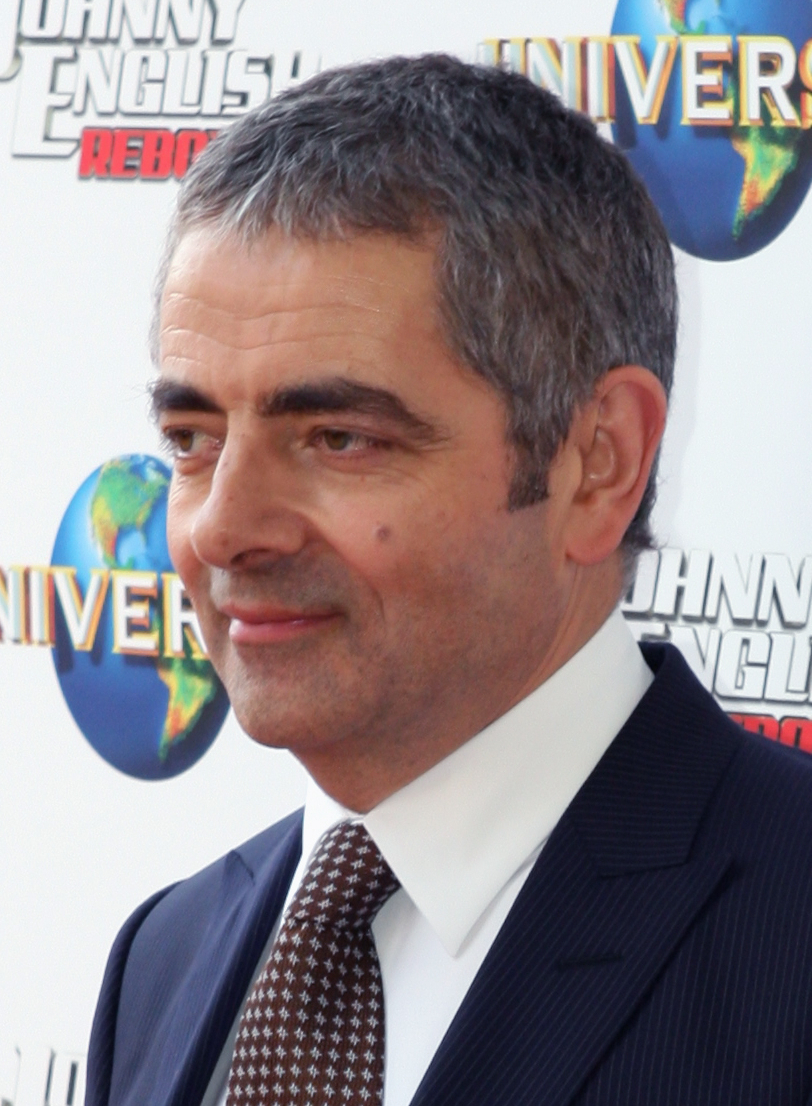
Rowan Atkinson

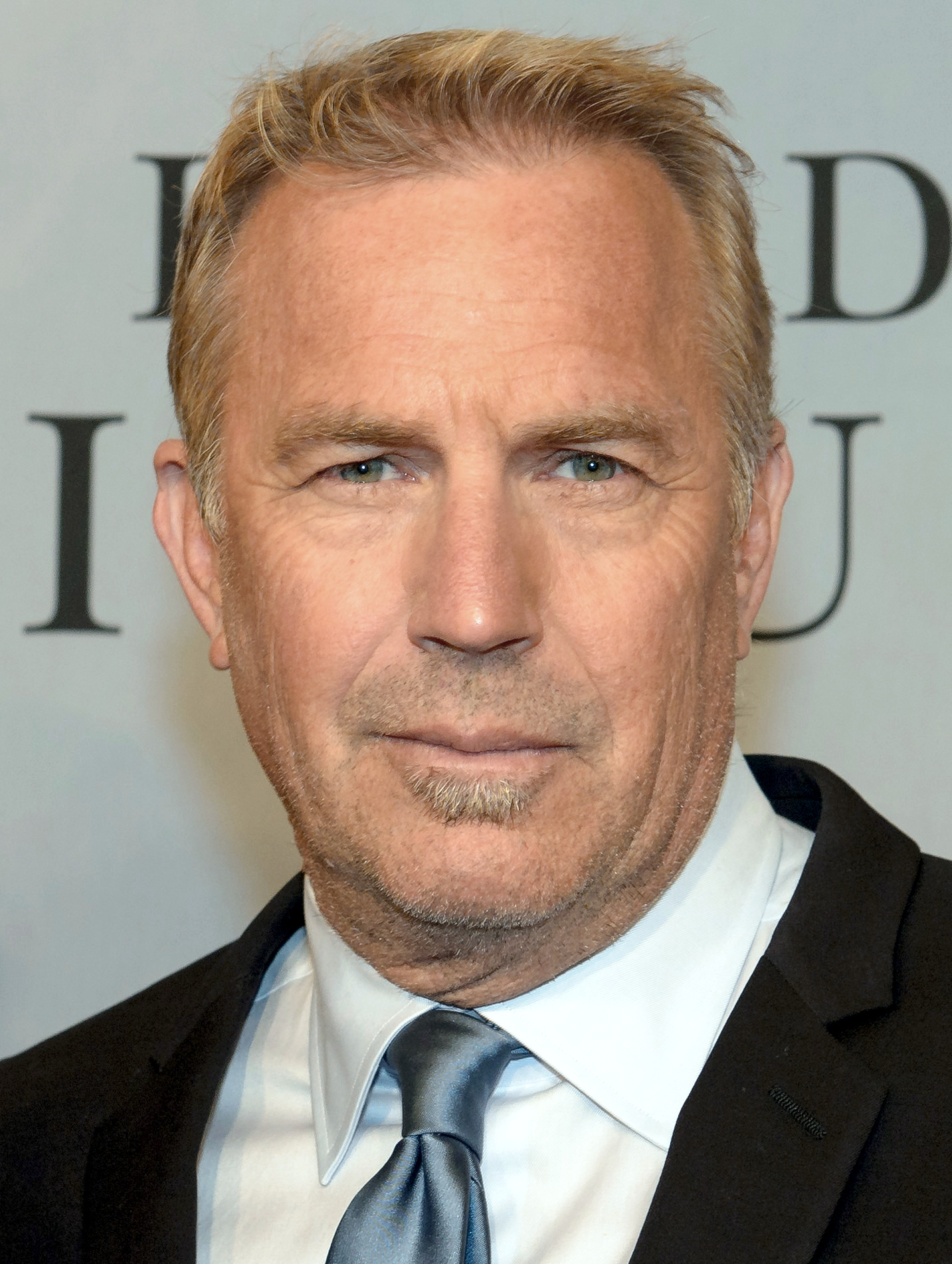
Kevin Costner

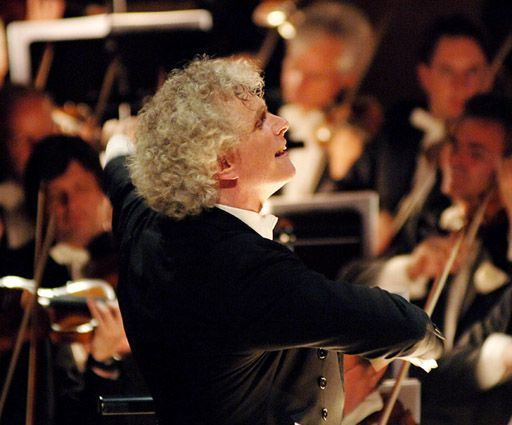
Sir Simon Rattle

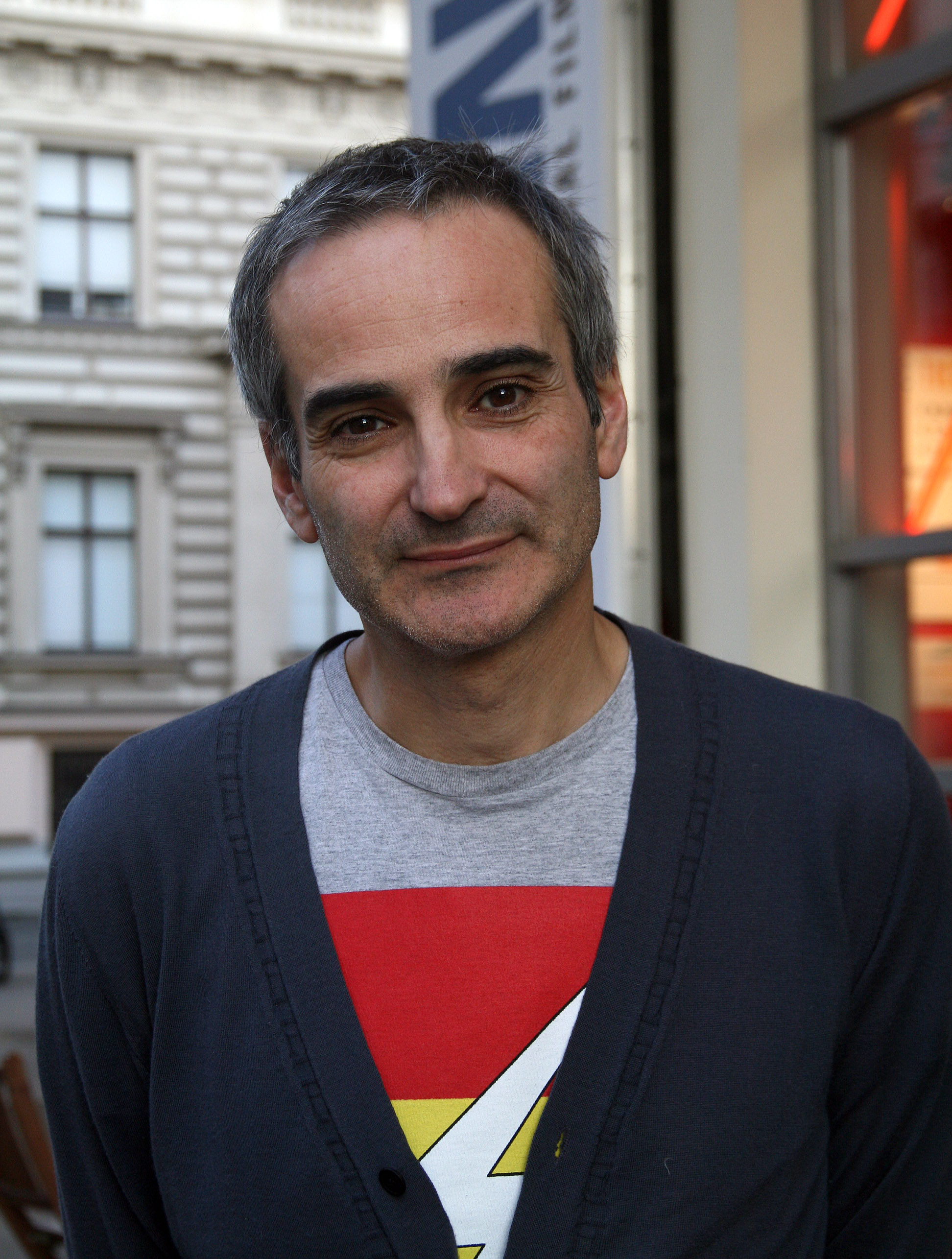
Olivier Assayas

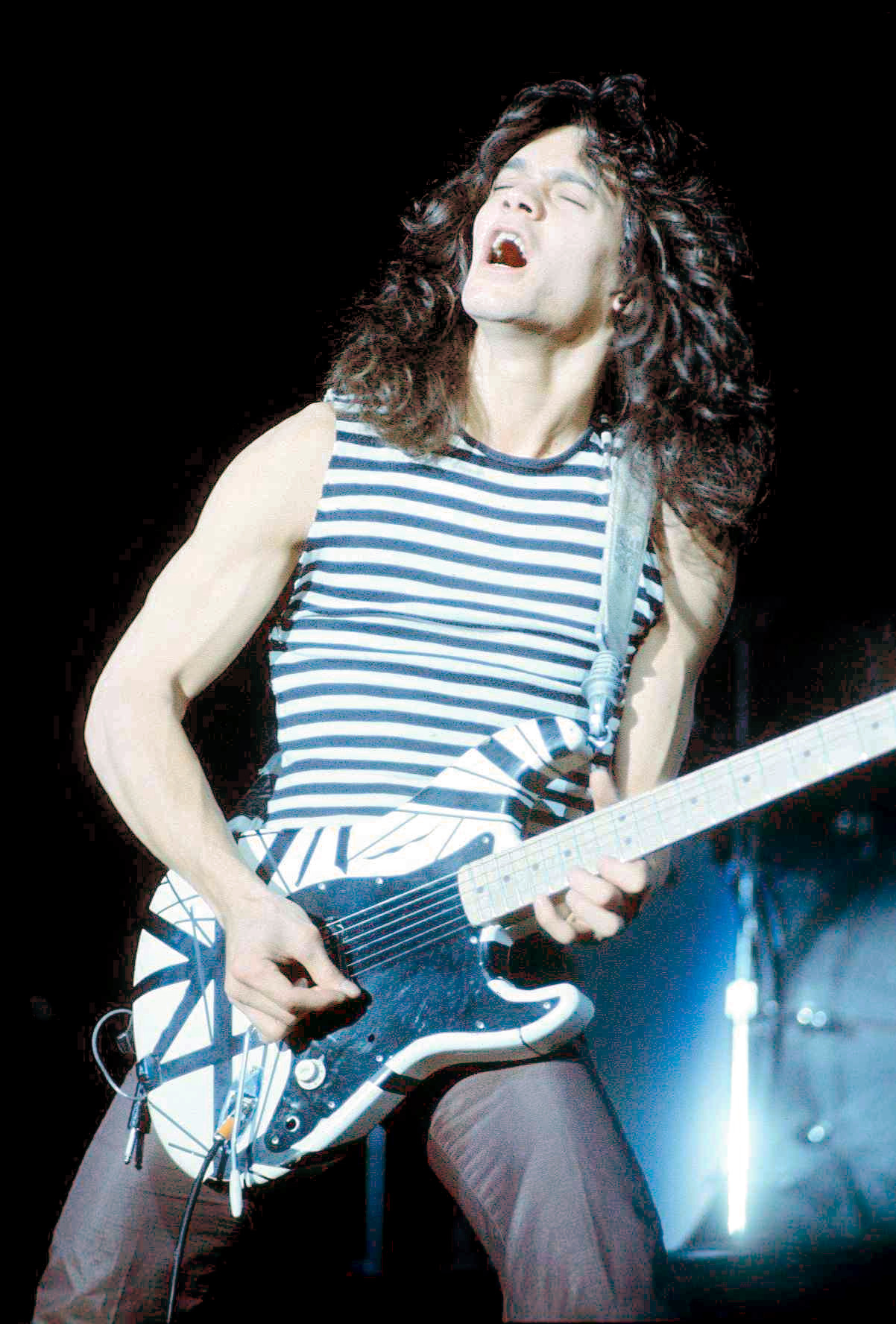
Eddie Van Halen

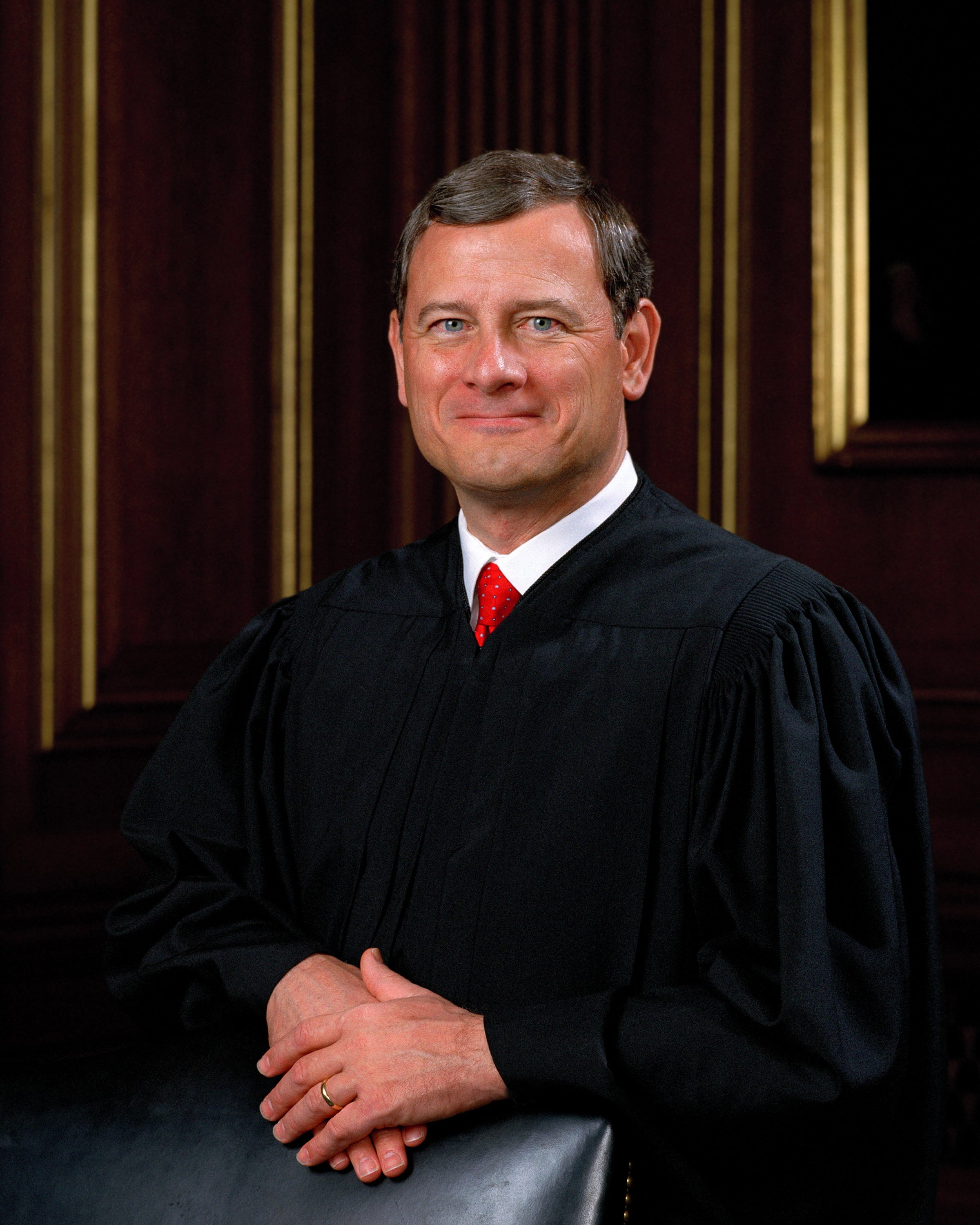
John Roberts

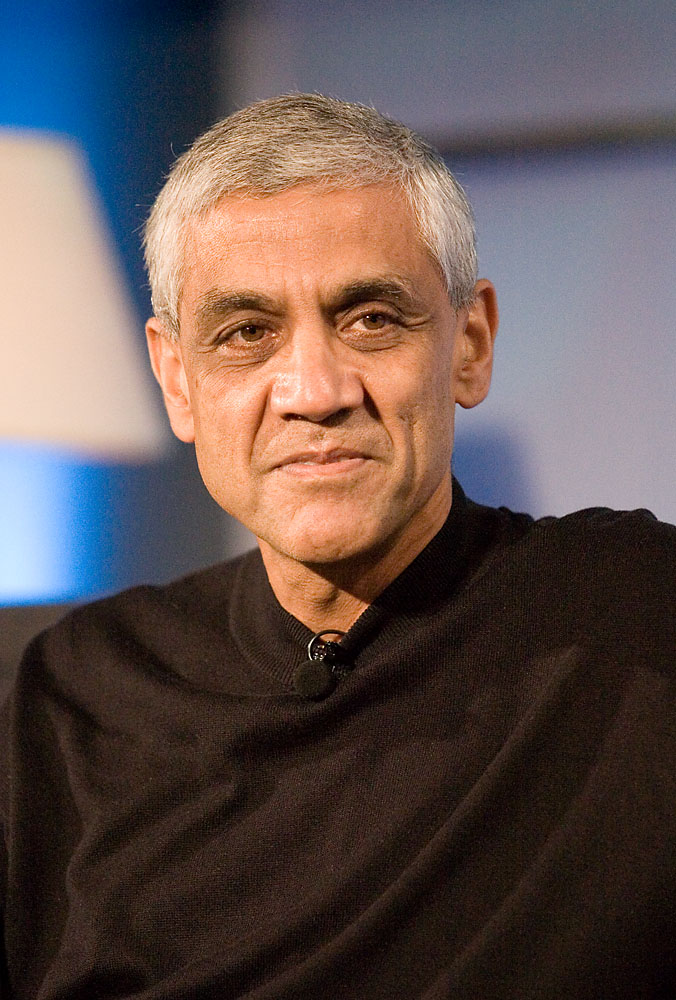
Vinod Khosla

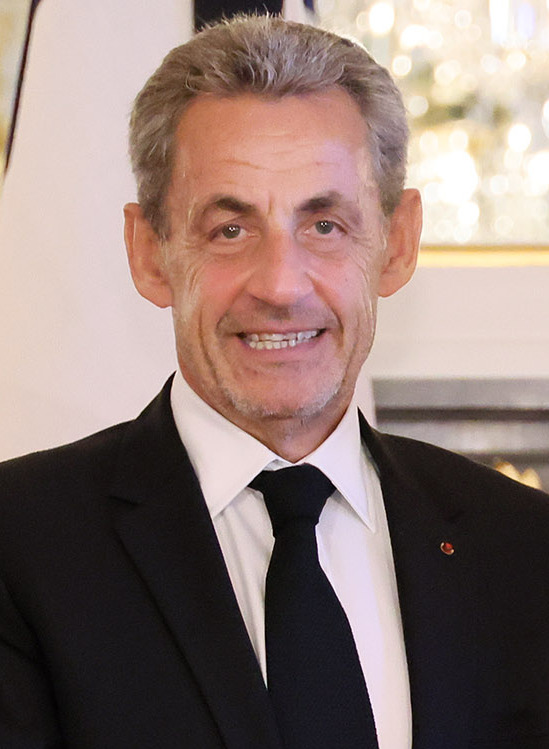
Nicolas Sarkozy

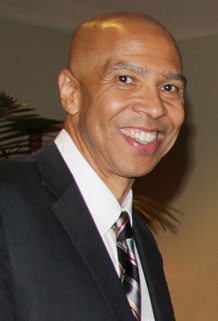
Mychal Thompson

- January 1
  - Mary Beard, English classicist
  - Simon Schaffer, English historian of science and philosophy
  - Mulatu Teshome, Ethiopian politician and 8th President of Ethiopia
- January 4 – Mark Hollis, English musician (d. 2019)
- January 5 – Mamata Banerjee, Indian politician, Chief Minister of West Bengal
- January 6 – Rowan Atkinson, English comic actor
- January 7 – Belinda Meuldijk, Dutch actress
- January 9
  - Michiko Kakutani, American literary critic
  - J. K. Simmons, American actor
- January 10 – Michael Schenker, German guitarist (Scorpions, UFO, Michael Schenker Group)
- January 13
  - Paul Kelly, Australian musician
  - Jay McInerney, American writer
- January 15 – Andreas Gursky, German photographer
- January 17
  - Steve Earle, American crossover singer-songwriter
  - Katalin Karikó, Hungarian-born biochemist, Nobel Prize laureate
- January 18
  - Kevin Costner, American actor, producer and director
  - Frankie Knuckles, American disk jockey and record producer (d. 2014)
  - Marilyn Mazur, Danish percussionist
- January 19
  - Sir Simon Rattle, English orchestral conductor
  - Paul Rodriguez, Mexican American actor and comedian
- January 20 – McKeeva Bush, Caymanian politician
- January 21 – Jeff Koons, American artist
- January 22 – Sonja Morgenstern, German figure skater
- January 25 – Olivier Assayas, French film director
- January 26
  - Eddie Van Halen, Dutch-American rock musician (Van Halen) (d. 2020)
  - Lucía Méndez, Mexican film actress
- January 27 – John Roberts, Chief Justice of the United States
- January 28
  - Vinod Khosla, Indian-born American venture capitalist
  - Nicolas Sarkozy, 23rd President of France
- January 30 – Mychal Thompson, Bahamian basketball player
- January 31 – Virginia Ruzici, Romanian tennis player

=== February ===
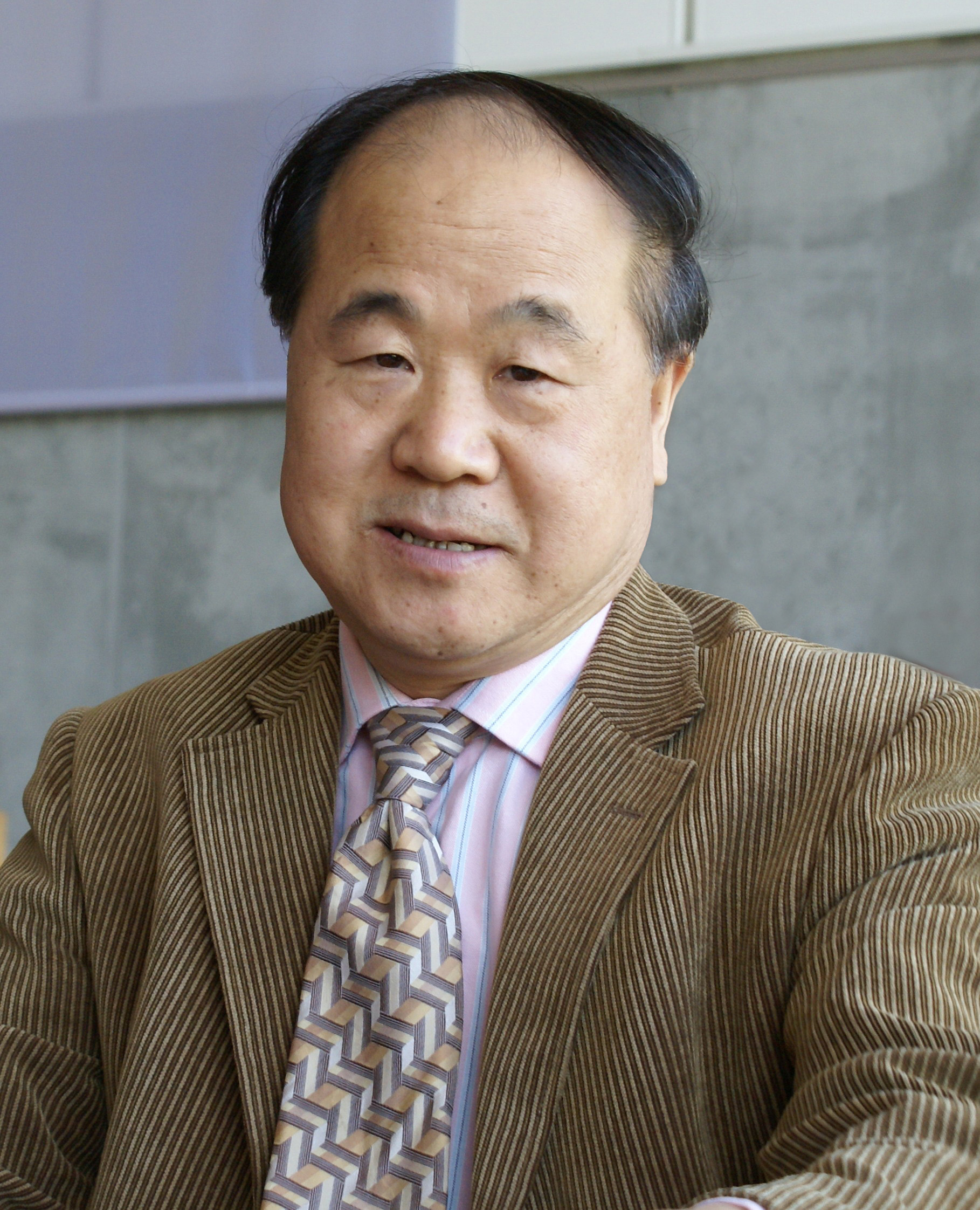
Mo Yan

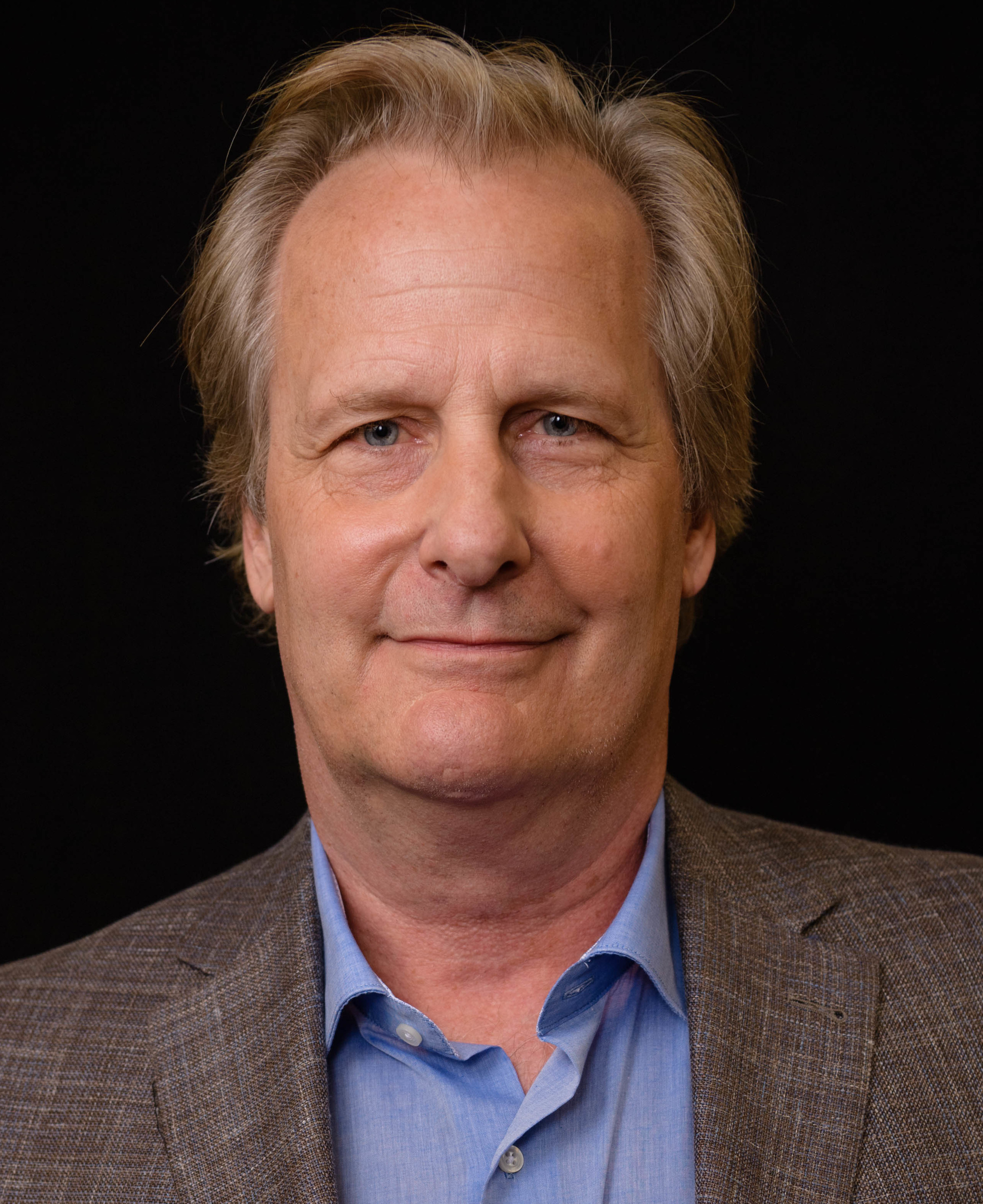
Jeff Daniels

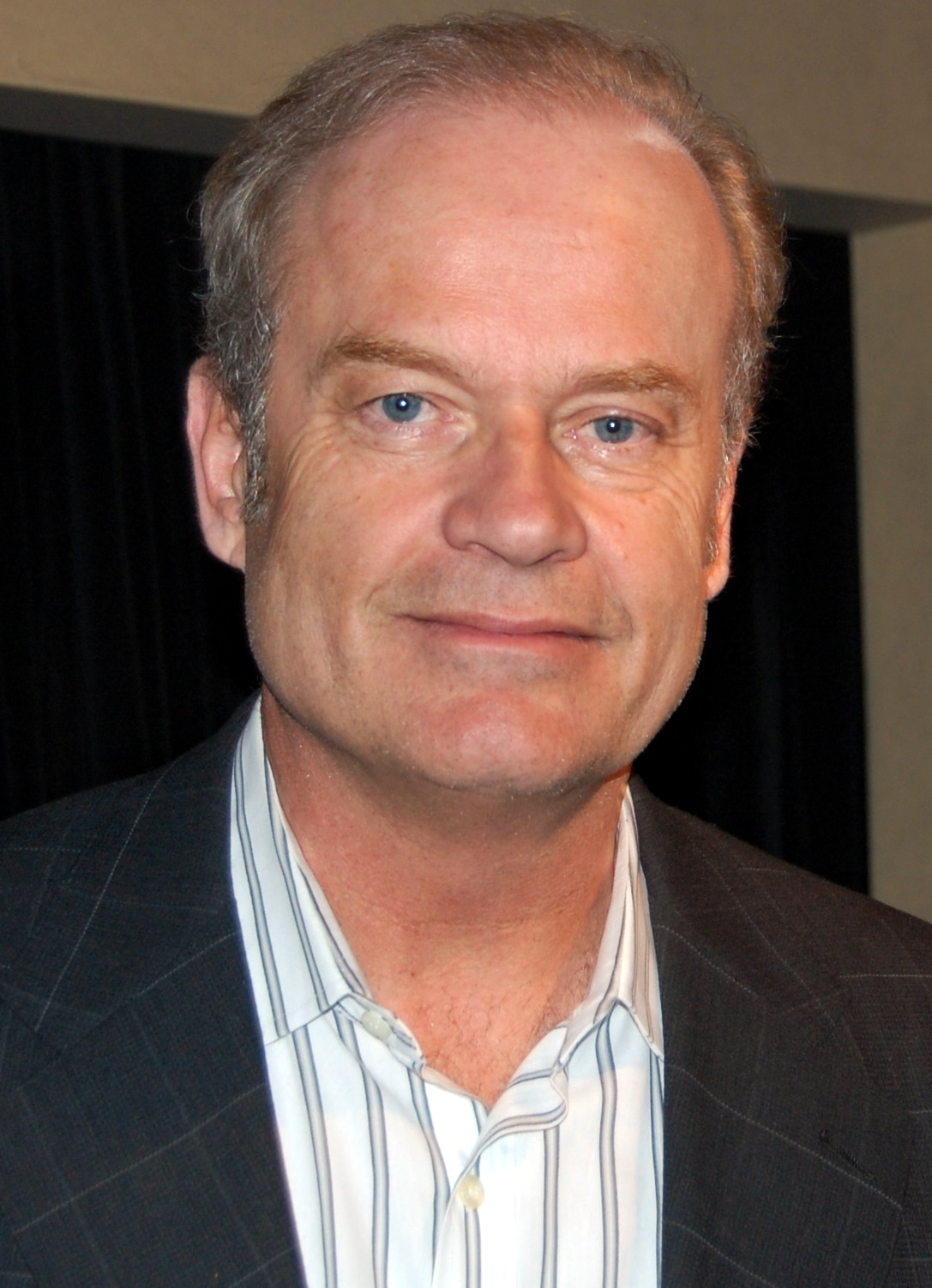
Kelsey Grammer

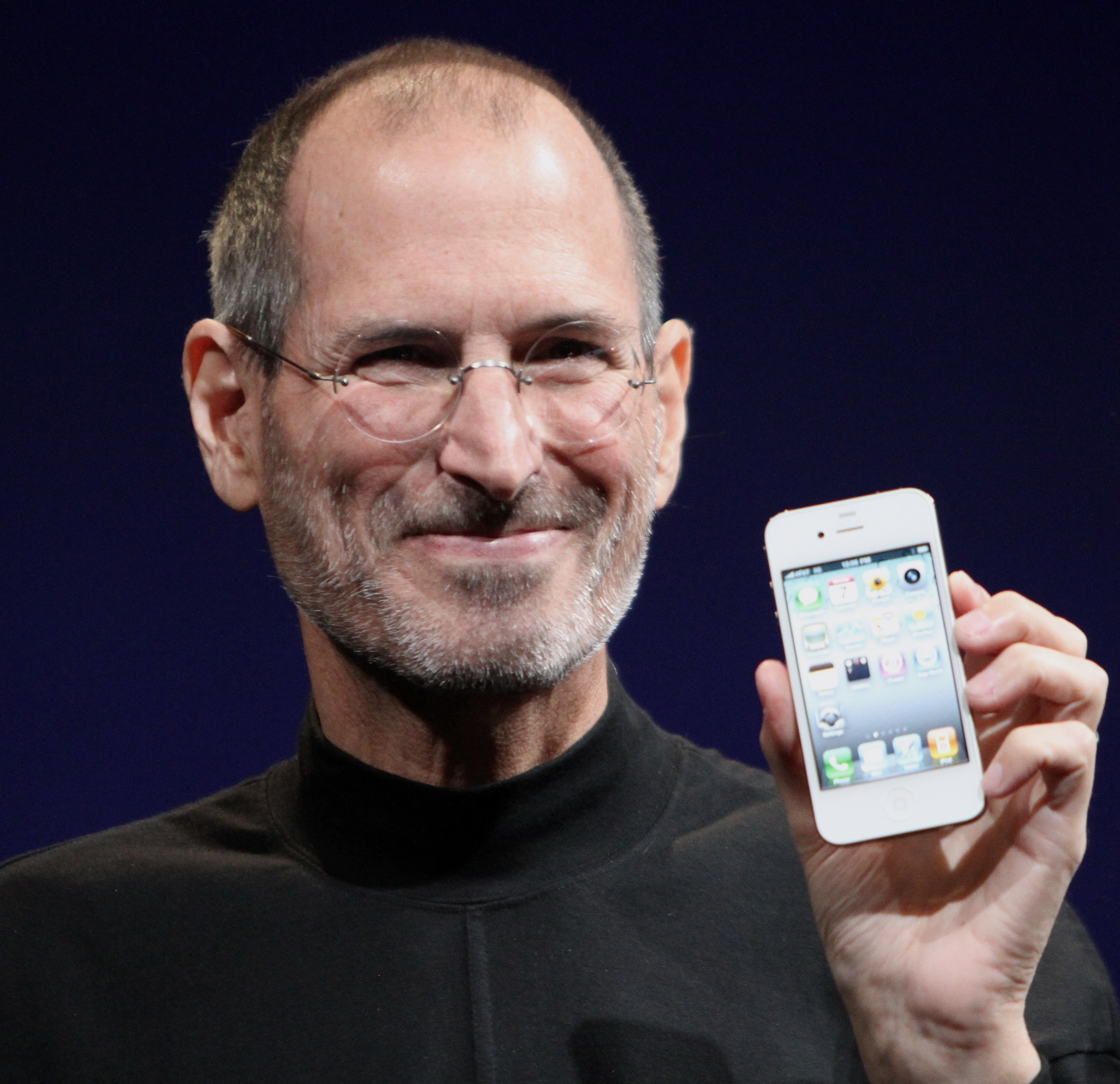
Steve Jobs

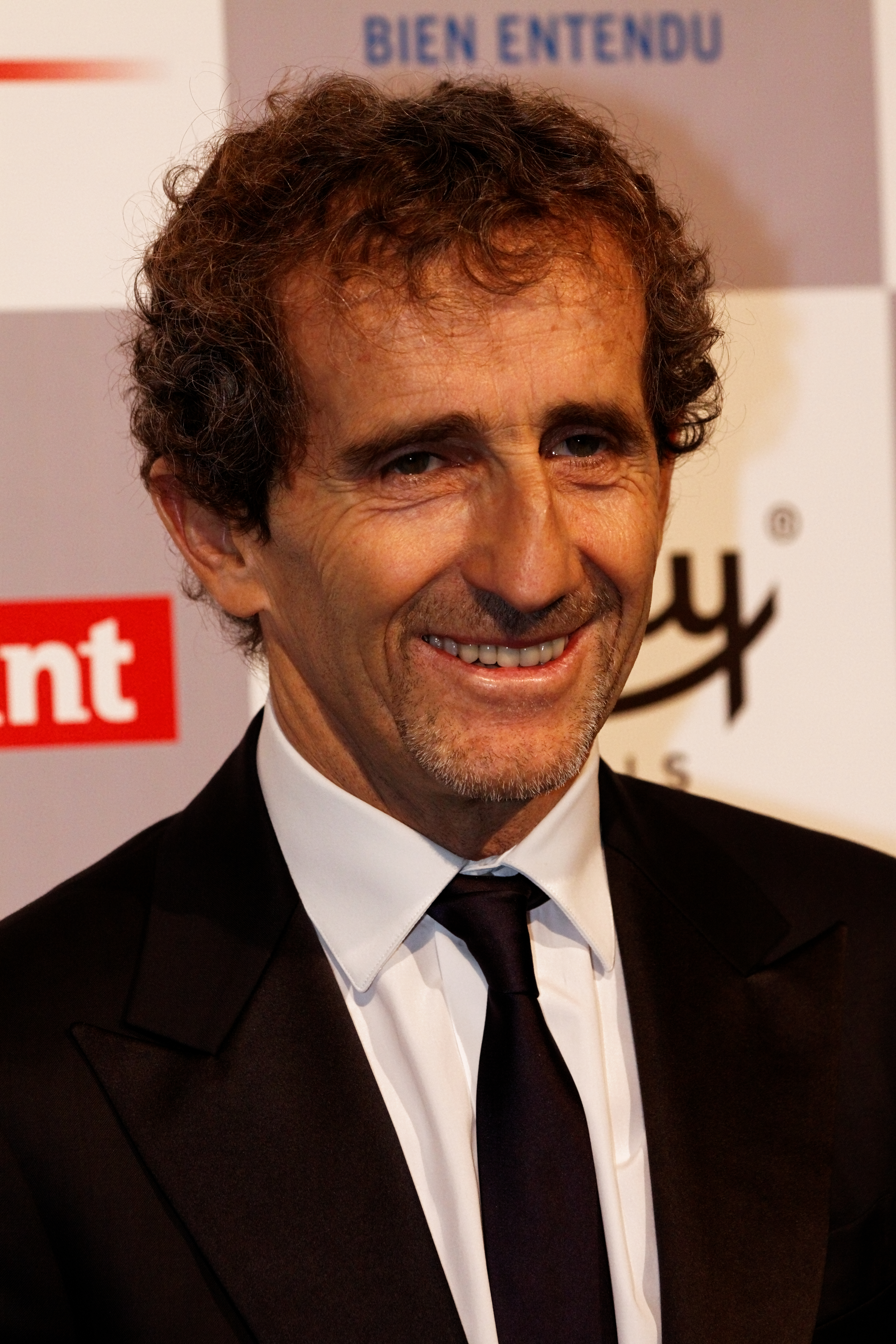
Alain Prost

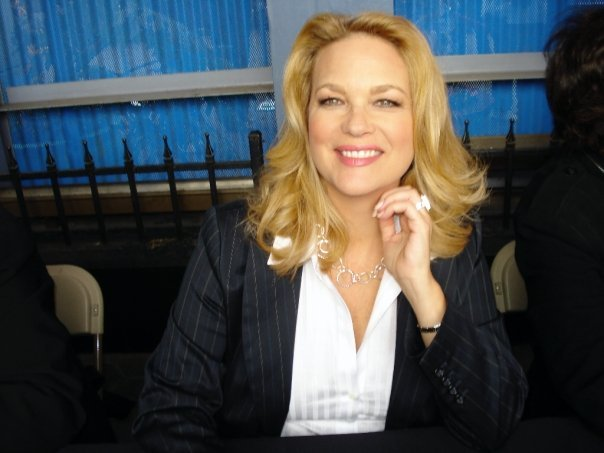
Leann Hunley

- February 2 – Leszek Engelking, Polish poet, writer and translator (d. 2022)
- February 3 – Izzeldin Abuelaish, Canadian-Palestinian doctor and author
- February 5 – Mary Chen, Taiwanese environmentalist and politician
- February 6 – Irinej Dobrijević, American-born Serbian Bishop of Australia and New Zealand
- February 7 – Miguel Ferrer, American actor (d. 2017)
- February 8
  - Janusz Cisek, Polish historian (d. 2020)
  - Jim Neidhart, American professional wrestler (d. 2018)
  - John Grisham, American novelist
  - Ethan Phillips, American actor
  - Xu Bing, Chinese artist
- February 10
  - Pablo Borges Delgado, Cuban artist
  - Jayarathna Herath, Sri Lankan politician, cabinet minister, MP (2000–2024)
  - Greg Norman, Australian golfer
- February 14
  - Guillermo Francella, Argentine actor
  - Mitsuhisa Taguchi, Japanese footballer (d. 2019)
- February 15
  - Janice Dickinson, American model, photographer, author and talent agent
  - Christopher McDonald, American actor
- February 16 – Bradley Byrne, American business attorney and politician, Alabama
- February 17 – Mo Yan, Chinese writer
- February 19
  - Jeff Daniels, American actor
  - Siri Hustvedt, American novelist
- February 21 – Kelsey Grammer, American actor and comedian
- February 22 – David Axelrod, American political analyst
- February 23 – Flip Saunders, American basketball coach (d. 2015)
- February 24
  - Deborah Coyne, Canadian constitutional lawyer
  - Steve Jobs, American businessman and founder of Apple Computer (d. 2011)
  - Alain Prost, French four-time Formula 1 world champion
- February 27 – Grady Booch, American software engineer
- February 28 – Gilbert Gottfried, American stand-up comedian and actor (d. 2022)

=== March ===
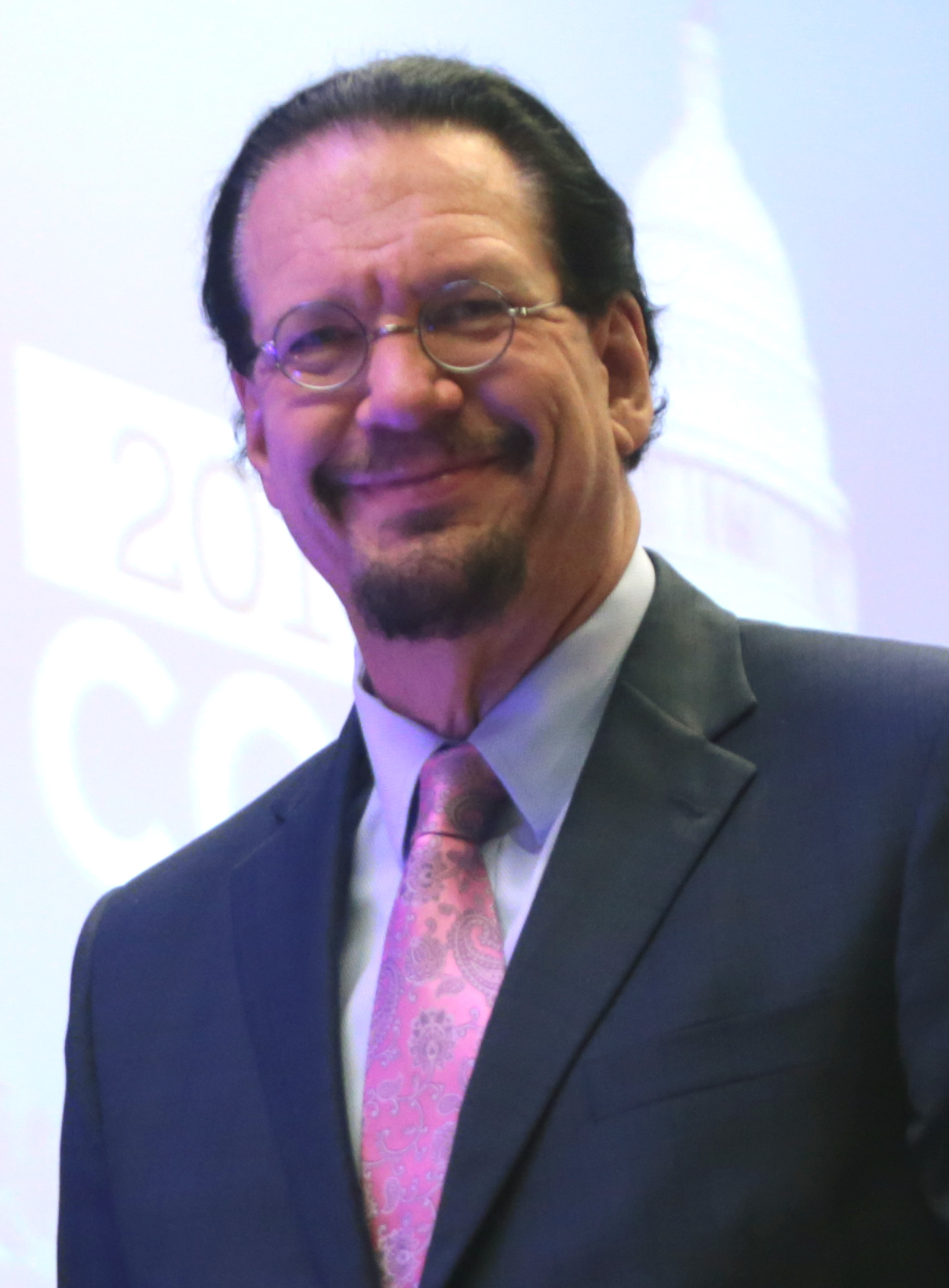
Penn Jillette

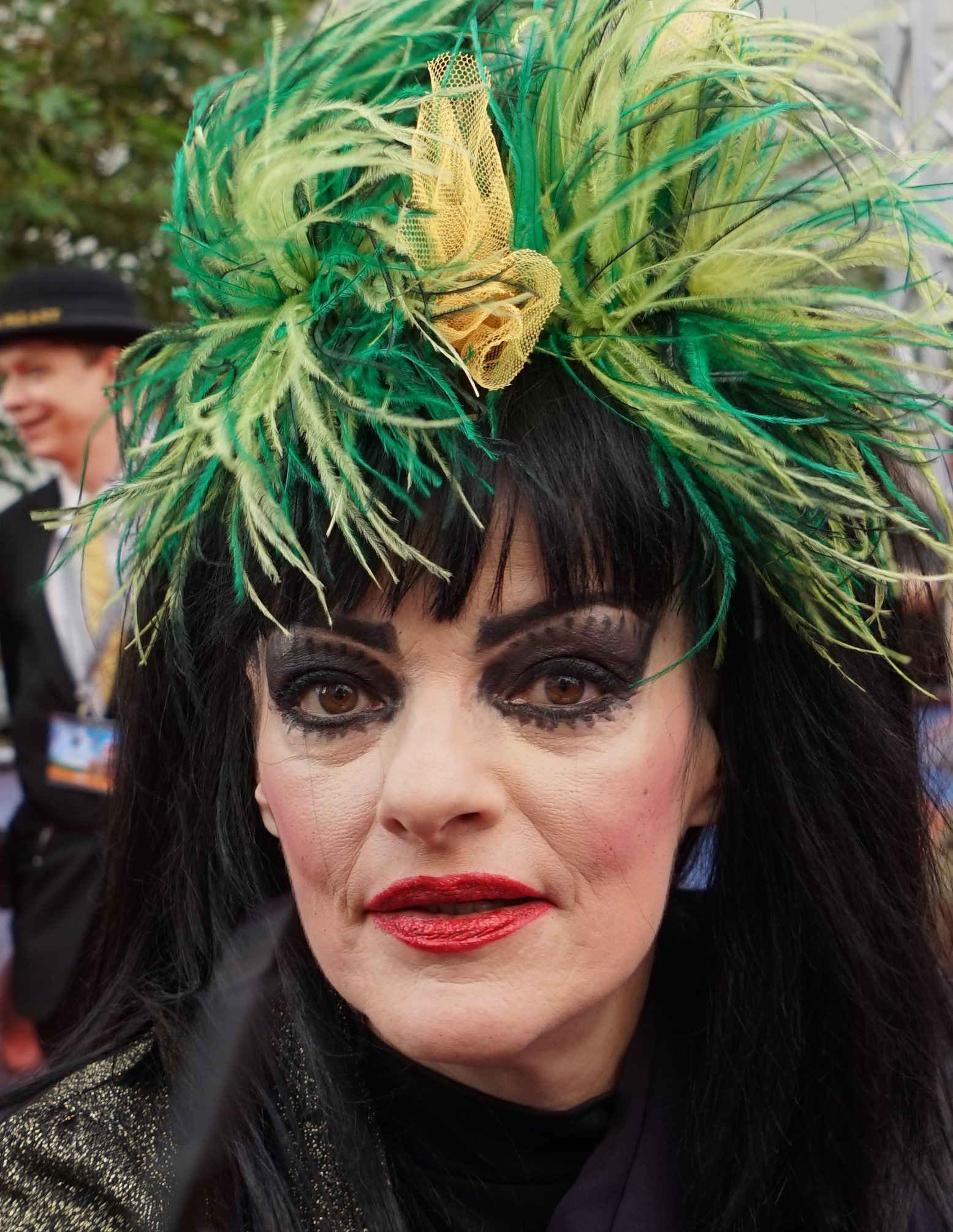
Nina Hagen

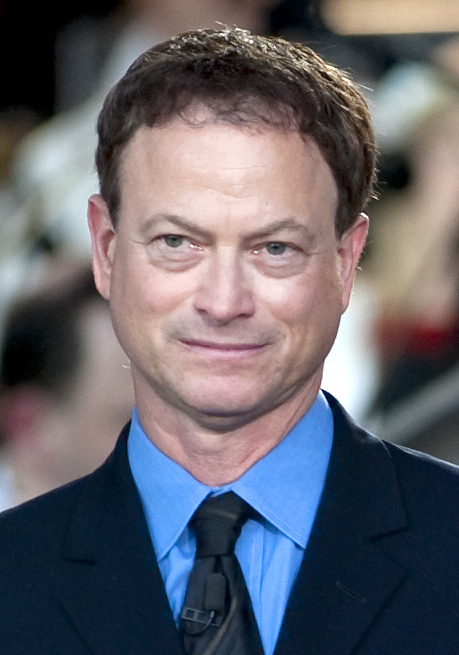
Gary Sinise

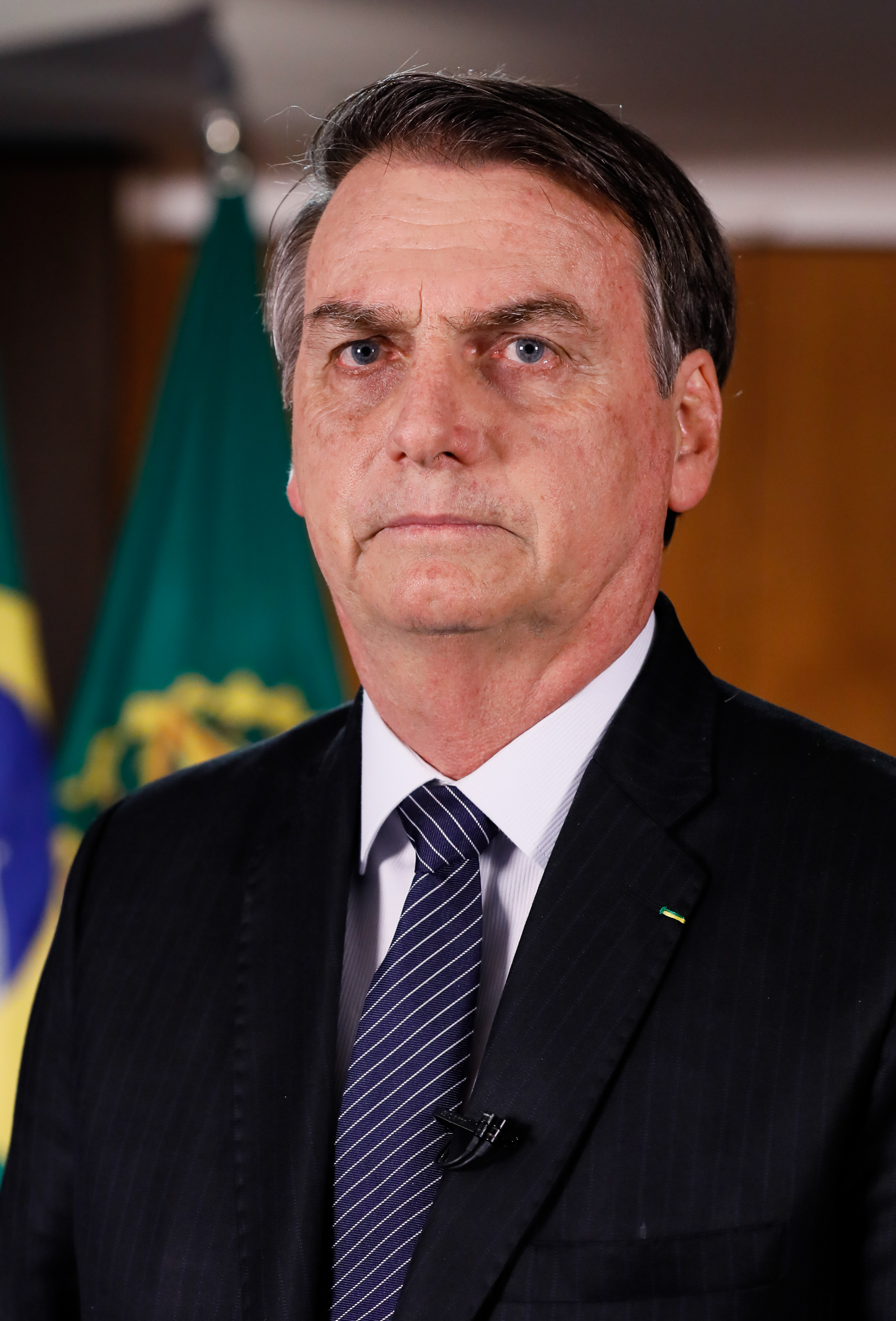
Jair Bolsonaro

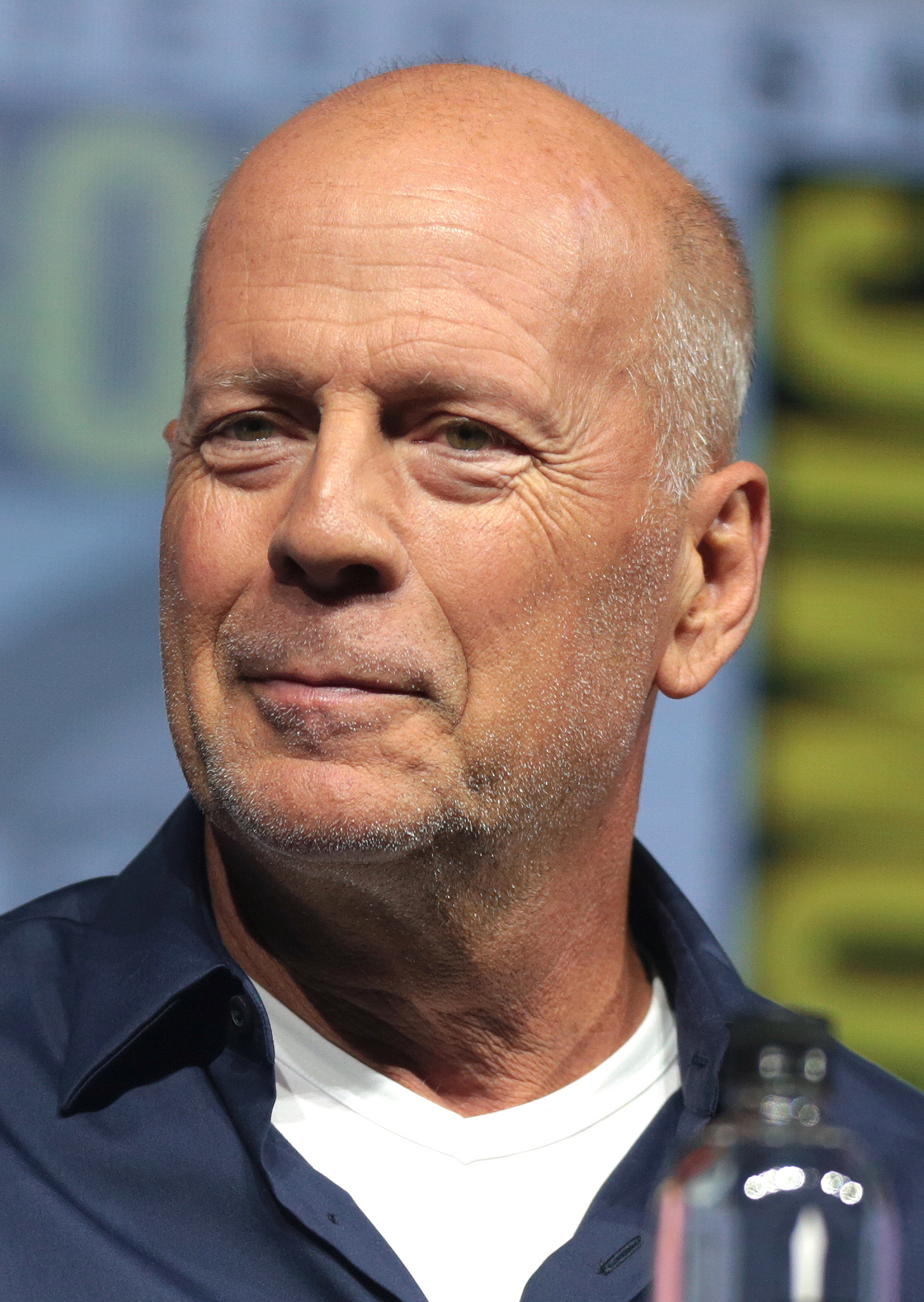
Bruce Willis

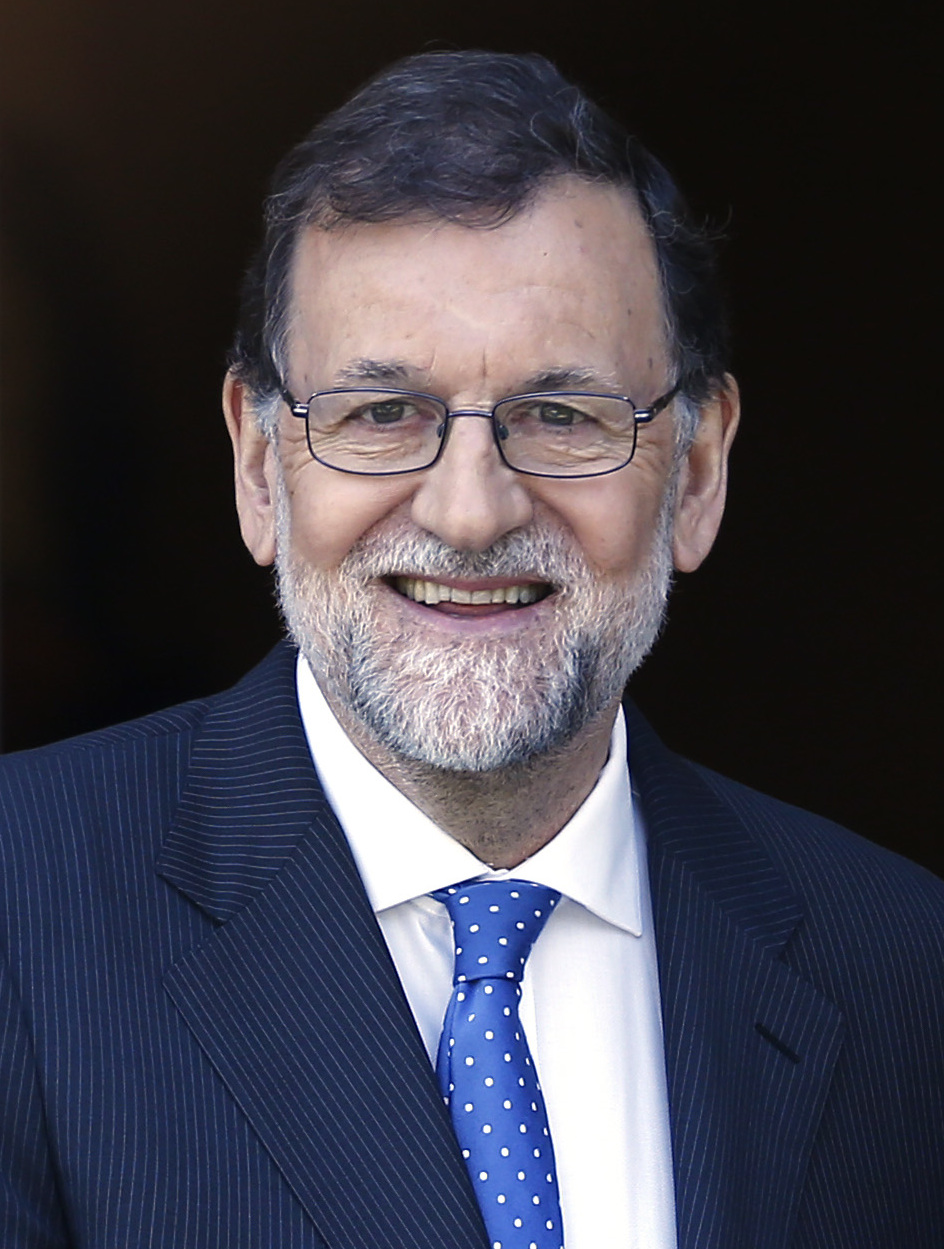
Mariano Rajoy

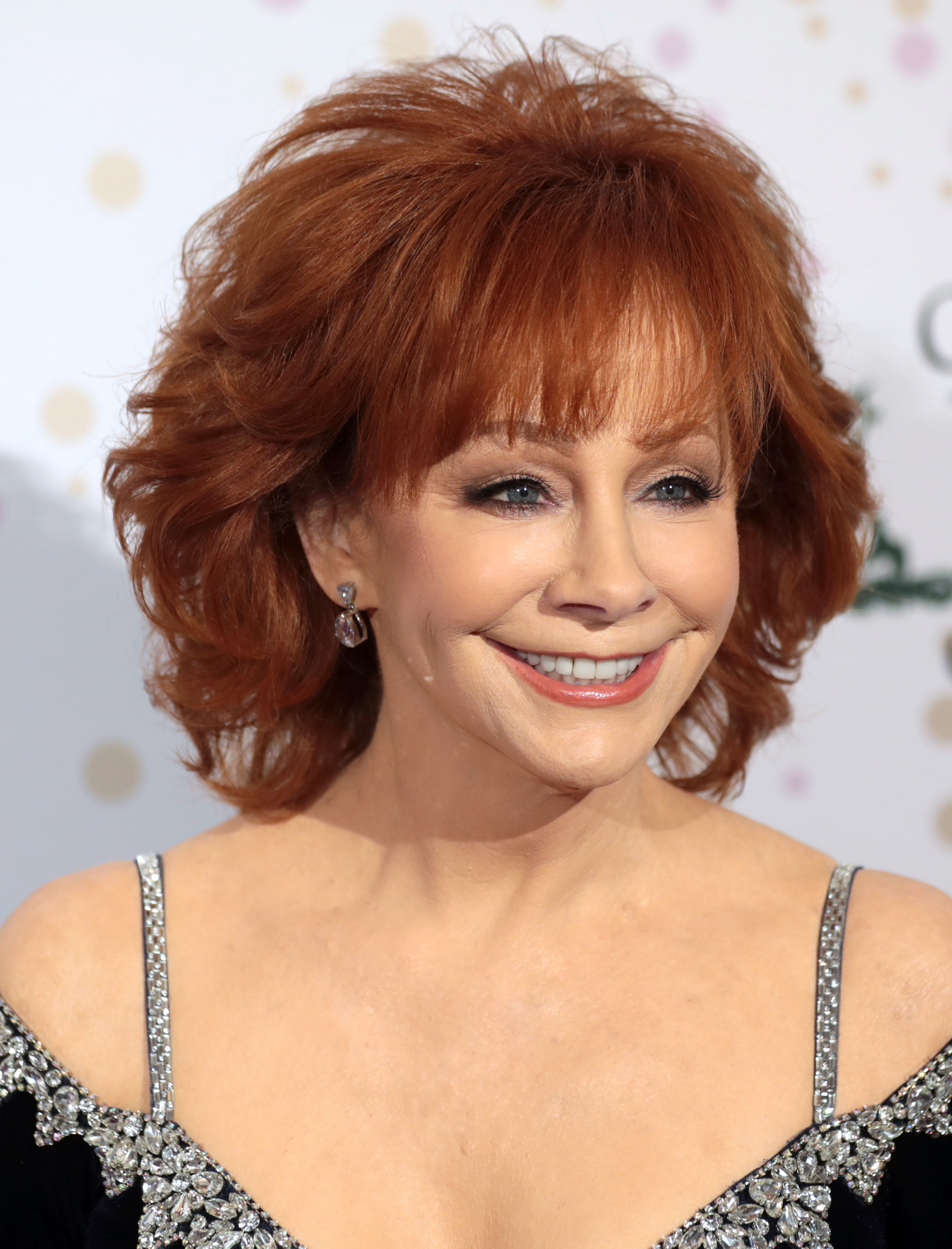
Reba McEntire

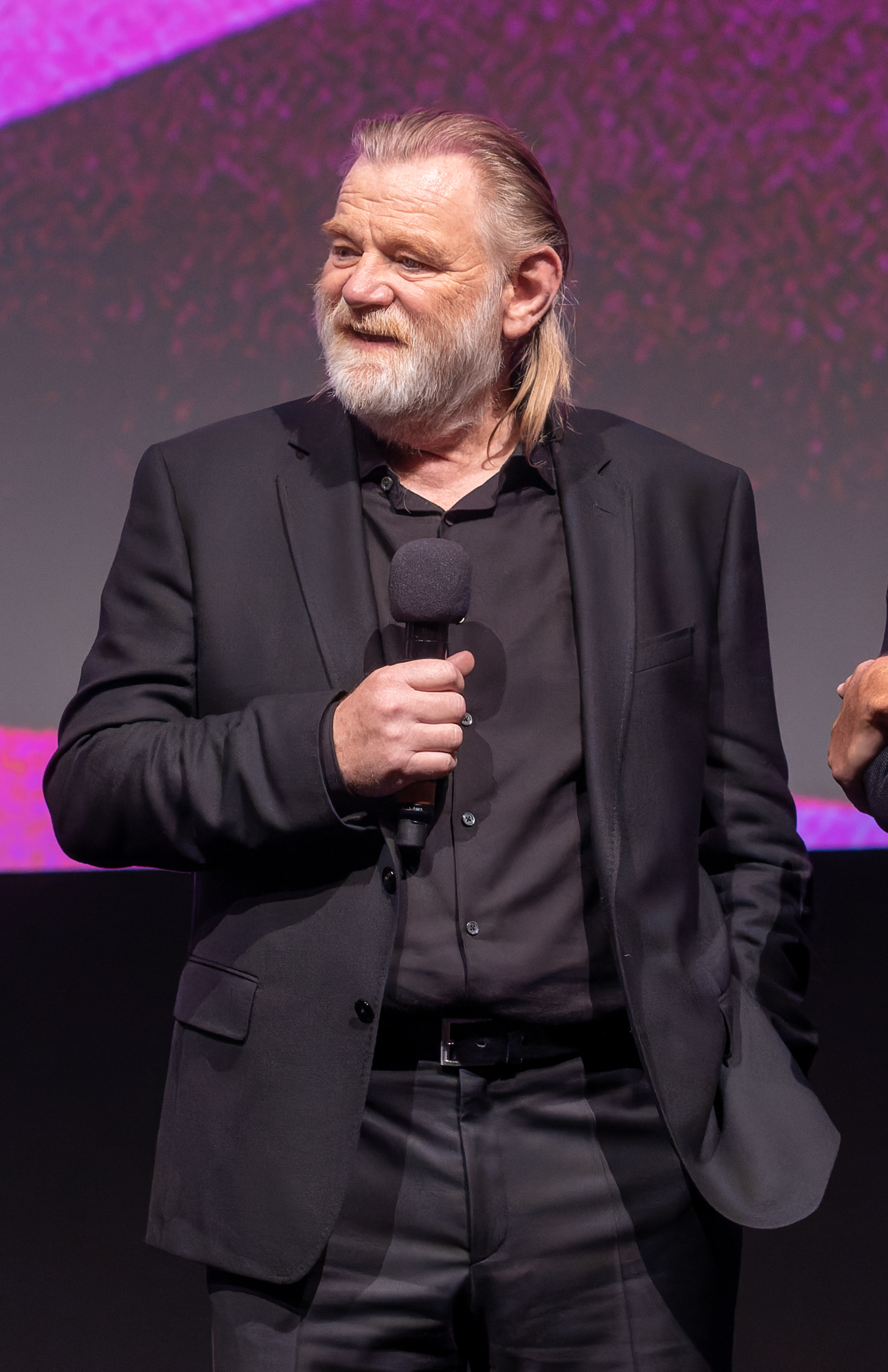
Brendan Gleeson

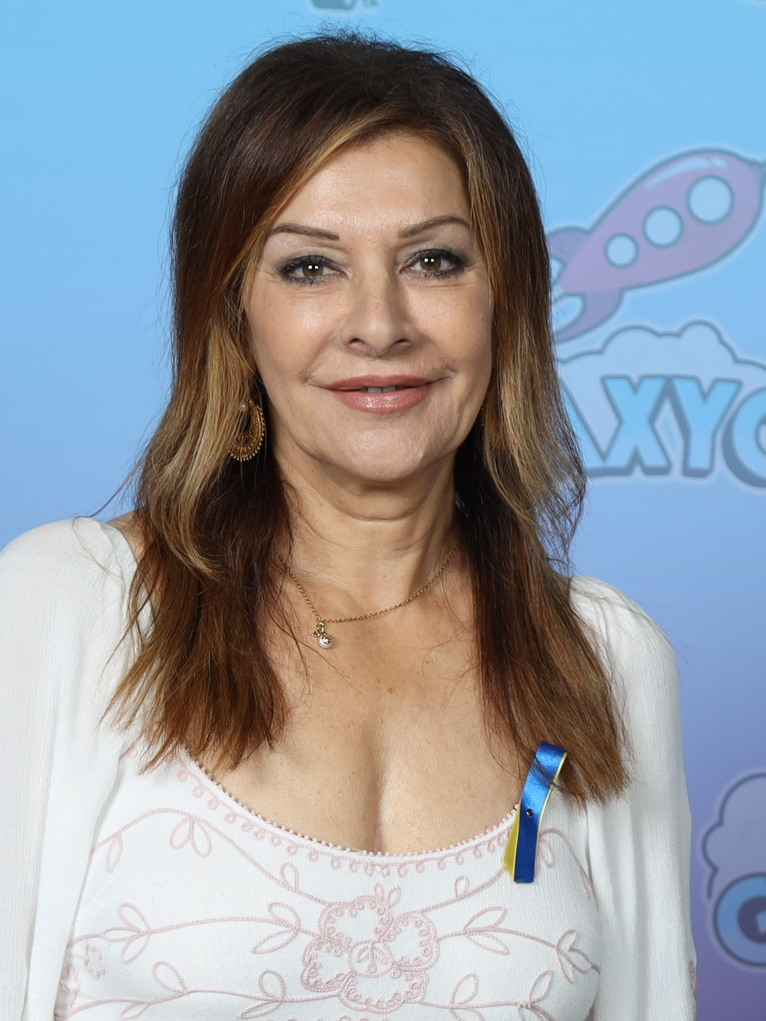
Marina Sirtis

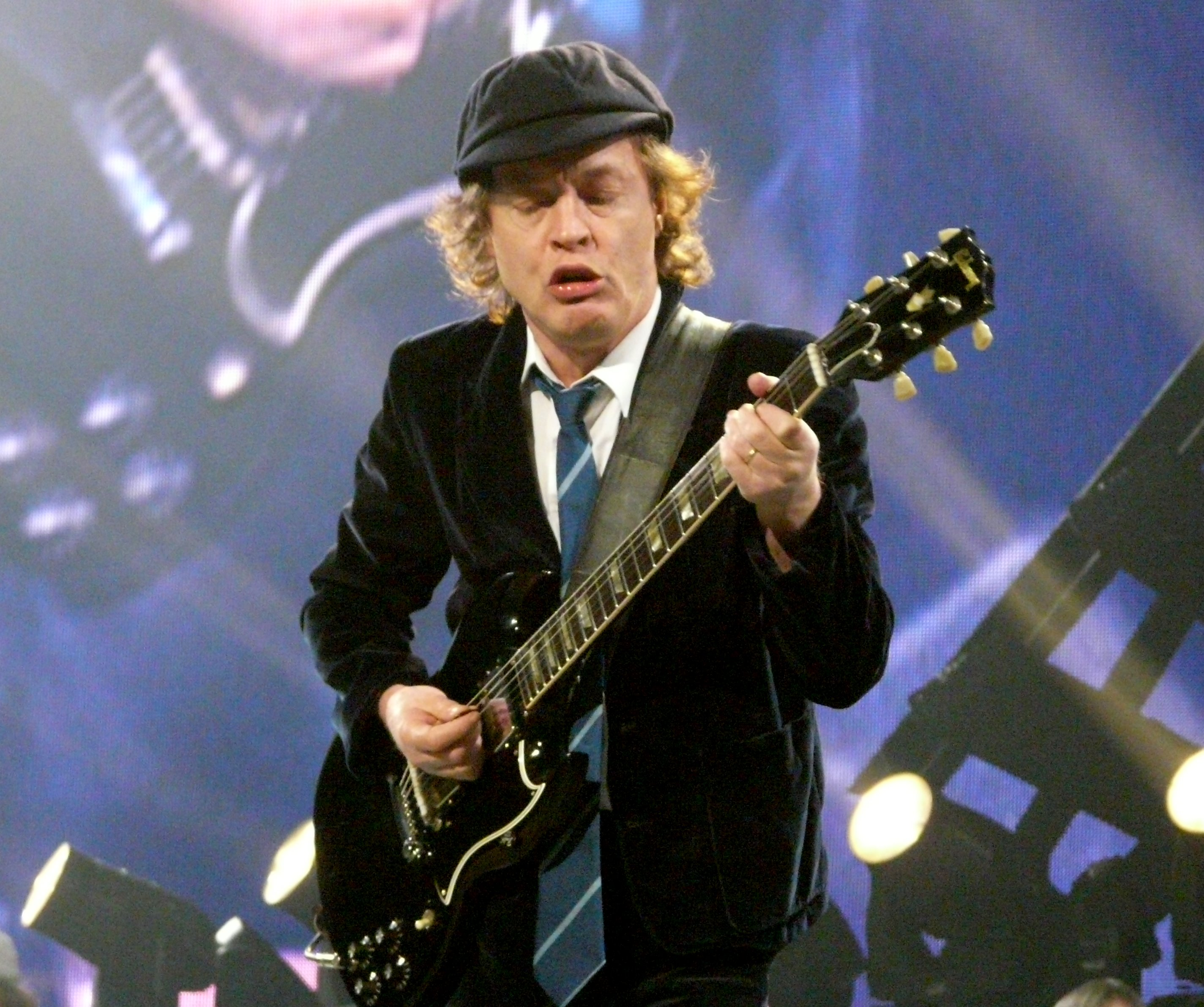
Angus Young

- March 1
  - Sir Timothy Laurence, English vice admiral and second husband of Anne, Princess Royal
  - Denis Mukwege, Congolese gynecologist, Nobel Peace Prize laureate
- March 2 – Shoko Asahara, Japanese cult leader (Aum Shinrikyo) (d. 2018)
- March 3 – Kent Derricott, Canadian TV personality in Japan
- March 4
  - Dominique Pinon, French actor
  - Tim Costello, Australian Baptist minister
- March 5
  - Julien Dray, French politician
  - Penn Jillette, American magician and comedian (Penn & Teller)
  - Deddy Mizwar, Indonesian politician, actor, movie Director
- March 6
  - Wendy Boglioli, American Olympic gold medallist swimmer (1976)
  - Jay Ilagan, Filipino actor (d. 1992)
  - Cyprien Ntaryamira, Burundian politician, 5th President of Burundi (d. 1994)
  - Alberta Watson, Canadian actress (d. 2015)
- March 8 – Don Ashby, Canadian ice hockey player (d. 1981)
- March 9
  - Ornella Muti, Italian actress
  - Franco Uncini, Italian motorcycle racer
- March 10
  - Yousra, Egyptian actress and singer
  - Marianne Rosenberg, German singer
- March 11 – Nina Hagen, German pop singer
- March 13
  - Bruno Conti, Italian football player
  - Gail Grandchamp, American female boxer
  - Glenne Headly, American actress of film, stage and television (d. 2017)
  - Milovan Bojić, Serbian medical doctor, administrator and politician
- March 14
  - Stephen R. Bissette, American comics artist
  - Daniel Bertoni, Argentine footballer
  - Nigel Biggar, British Anglican priest, theologian and ethicist
- March 15
  - Robert Kabbas, Egyptian-born Australian Olympic silver medallist weightlifter
  - Dee Snider, American rock singer (Twisted Sister)
- March 16
  - Bruno Barreto, Brazilian film director
  - Tina Beattie, British Christian theologian, writer and broadcaster
  - Jiro Watanabe, Japanese world super flyweight champion boxer
  - Bob Ley, American sports anchor and reporter
  - Petr Aven, Russian businessman, economist and politician
  - Michael L. Brown, American author and radio host
- March 17
  - Cynthia McKinney, American politician, activist
  - Gary Sinise, American actor, producer and director
  - Mark Boone Junior, American character actor
- March 18
  - Carlos Enrique Trinidad Gómez, Guatemalan Roman Catholic prelate (d. 2018)
  - Guillermo Dávila, Venezuelan actor and singer
  - Dwayne Murphy, American baseball player
  - Paul Chan Mo-po, Hong Kong politician and accountant
- March 19
  - Pino Daniele, Italian music artist (d. 2015)
  - Bruce Willis, American actor
  - Simon Yam, Hong Kong actor
- March 20
  - Eric Schiller, American chess player and author (d. 2018)
  - Mariya Takeuchi, Japanese singer-songwriter
- March 21
  - Jair Bolsonaro, Brazilian congressman and politician, 38th President of Brazil
  - Philippe Troussier, French football coach
  - Bärbel Wöckel, East German sprinter
- March 22
  - Lena Olin, Swedish actress
  - Pete Sessions, American politician
  - Valdis Zatlers, 7th President of Latvia
- March 23
  - Moses Malone, American basketball player (d. 2015)
  - Susan Schwab, American politician, who served under President George W. Bush as United States Trade Representative
- March 24
  - Kim Johnston Ulrich, American actress
  - Candy Reynolds, American tennis player
  - Celâl Şengör, Turkish geologist
- March 25
  - Wendy Larry, American head coach of the Old Dominion University Lady Monarchs women's basketball team
  - Daniel Boulud, French chef and restaurateur
  - Patty Brard, Dutch entertainer and entrepreneur of Indo descent
- March 26
  - Danny Arndt, Canadian ice hockey player
  - Dean Dillon, American country musician and songwriter
- March 27 – Mariano Rajoy, Prime Minister of Spain
- March 28
  - Reba McEntire, American country singer and actress
  - John Alderdice, Northern Ireland politician
- March 29
  - Earl Campbell, American football player
  - Margaret Cuomo, American radiologist
  - Brendan Gleeson, Irish actor
  - Christopher Lawford, American author, actor and activist (d. 2018)
  - Marina Sirtis, English actress
  - Henry Bellingham, British politician
- March 30
  - Marilou Diaz-Abaya, Filipina film director (d. 2012)
  - Randy VanWarmer, American singer-songwriter (d. 2004)
  - Humberto Vélez, Mexican voice actor
- March 31
  - Philip Dimitrov, Bulgarian politician
  - Angus Young, lead guitarist of Australian rock group AC/DC

=== April ===
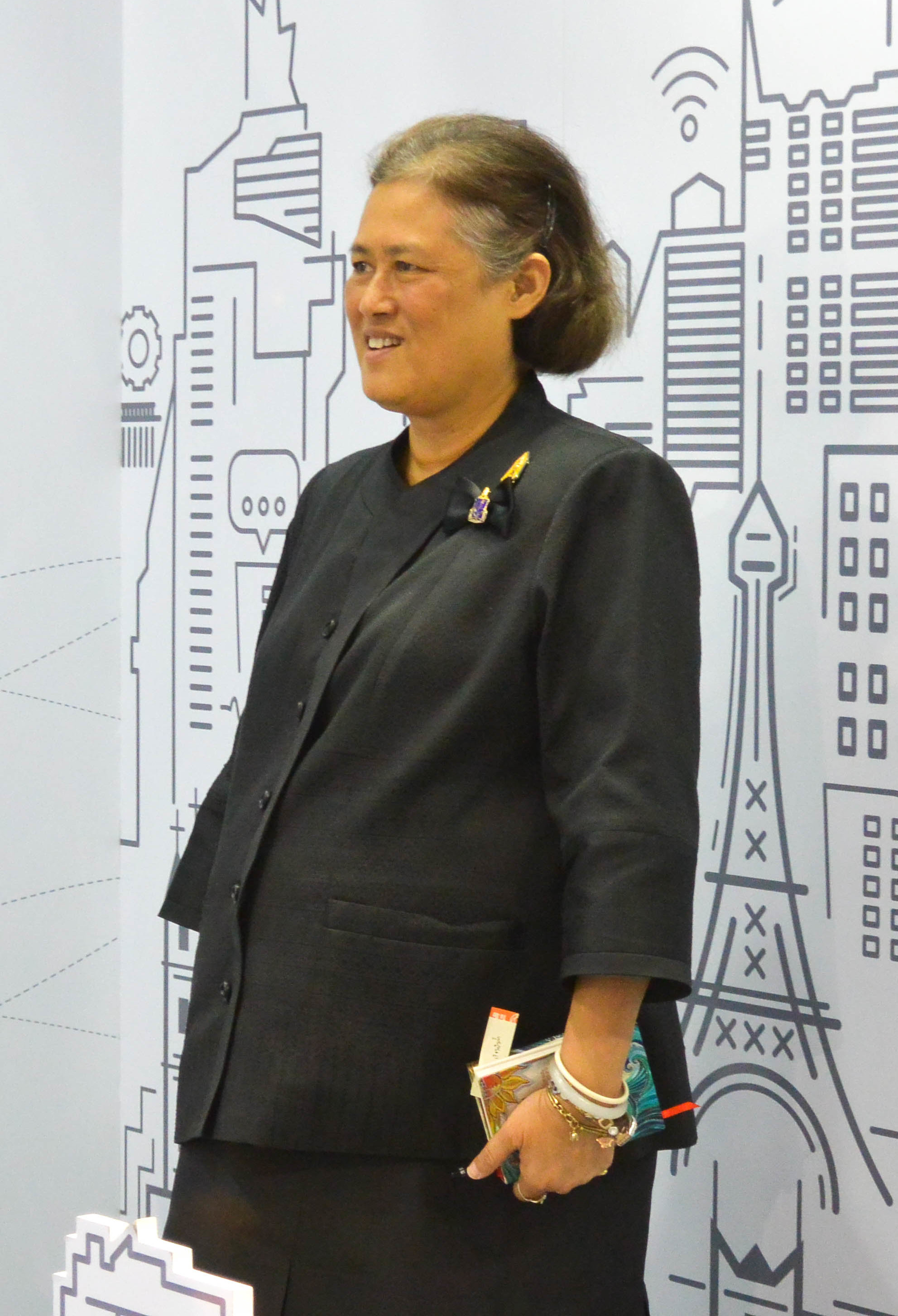
Sirindhorn

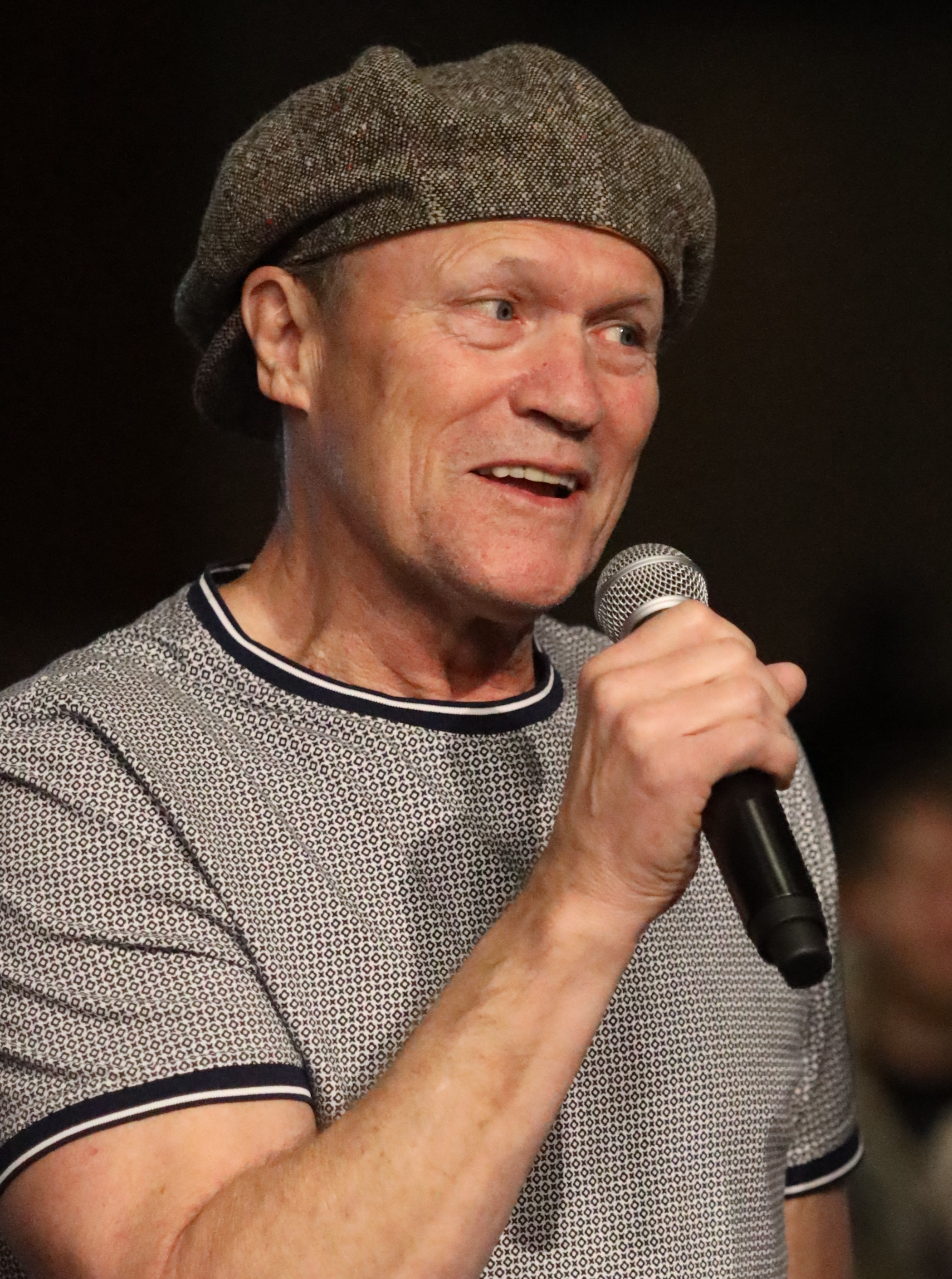
Michael Rooker

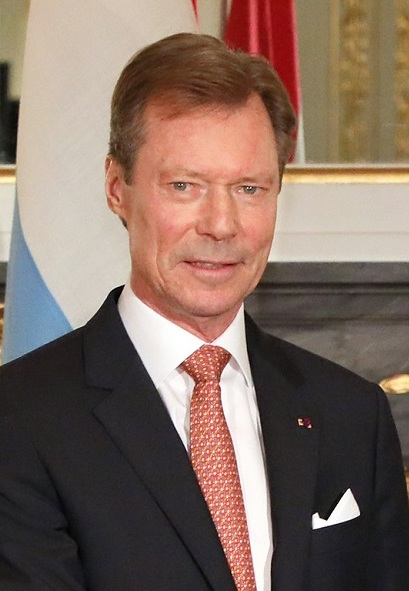
Henri, Grand Duke of Luxembourg

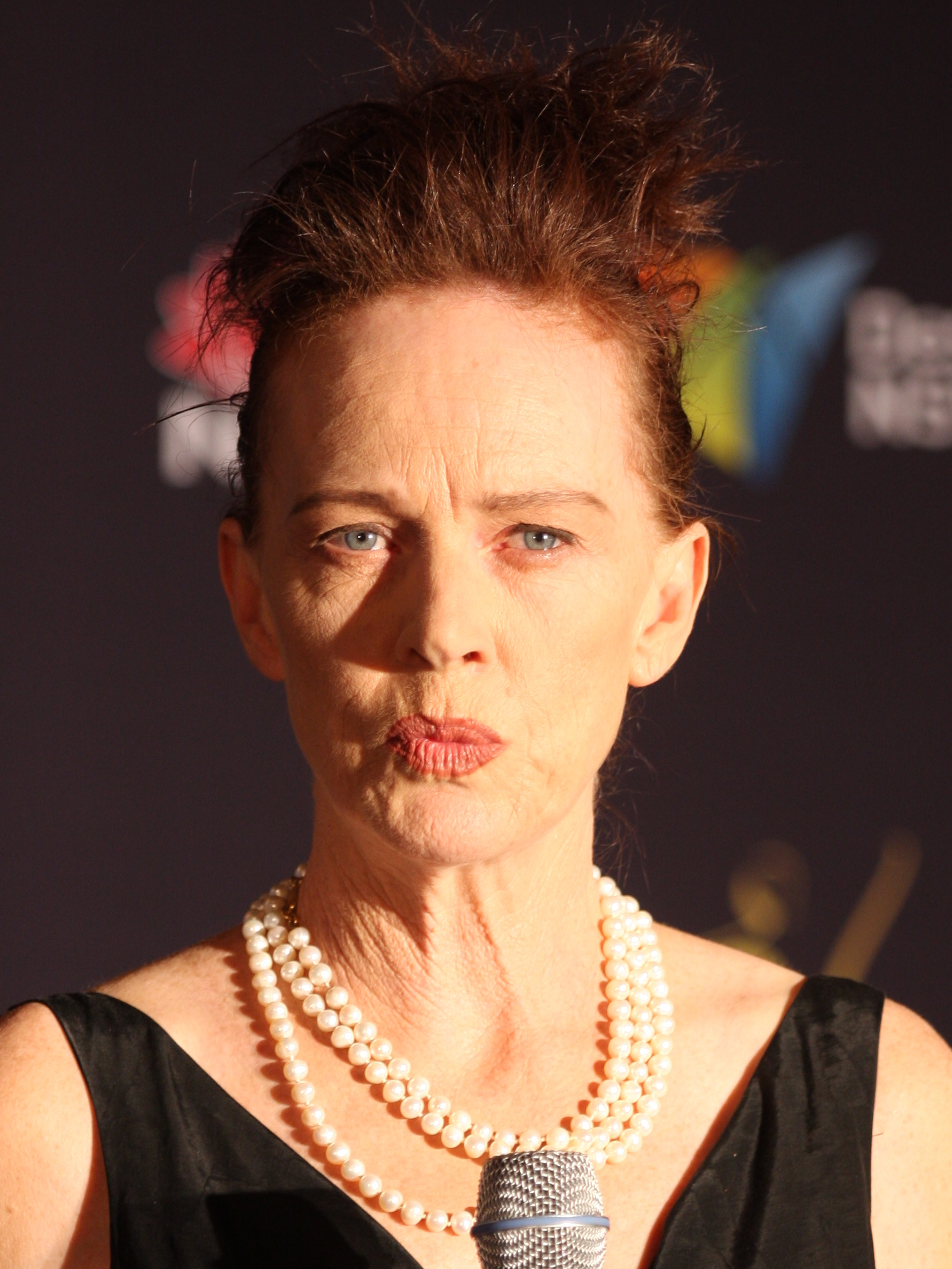
Judy Davis

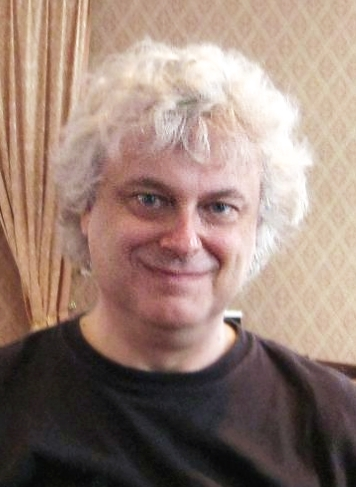
John Nunn

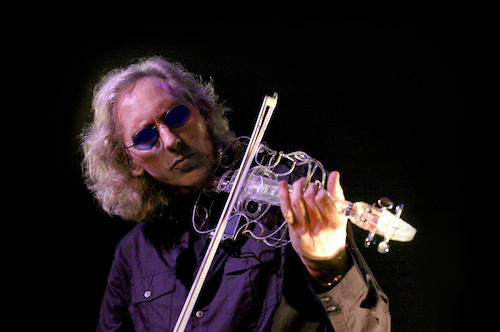
Eddie Jobson

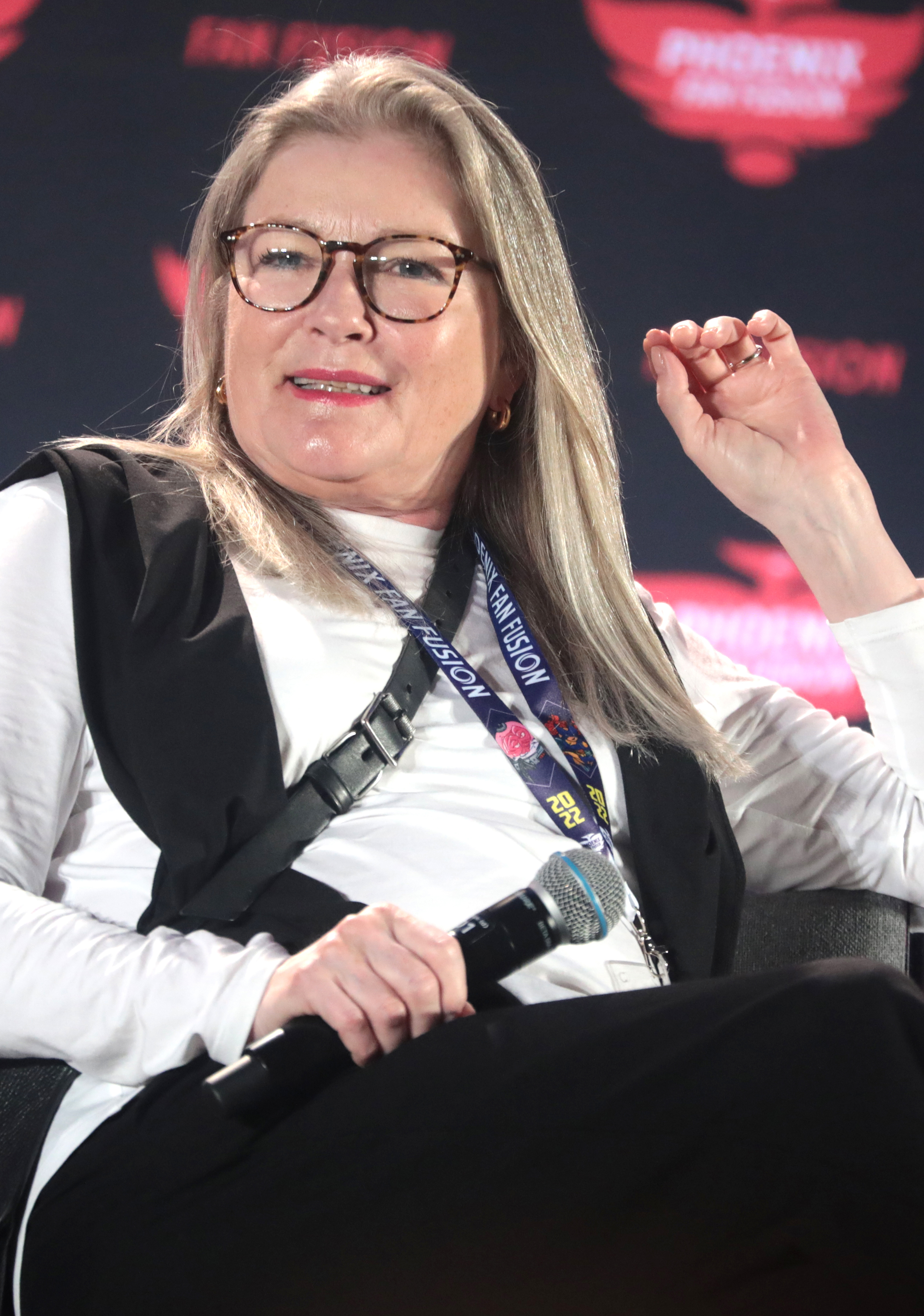
Kate Mulgrew

- April 1 – Ockie Oosthuizen, South African rugby union player (d. 2019)
- April 2
  - Sirindhorn, Princess Royal of Thailand
  - Chellie Pingree, Democratic politician, Maine's 1st congressional district
- April 3 – Mick Mars, American rock guitarist (Mötley Crüe)
- April 4
  - Casey Biggs, American actor
  - John Bird, Canadian engineer, scientist and journalist
- April 5
  - Akira Toriyama, Japanese manga artist (d. 2024)
  - Anthony Horowitz, English novelist and screenwriter
  - Lazarus Chakwera, Malawian politician and theologian, President of Malawi and minister of defence
- April 6 – Michael Rooker, American actor
- April 7
  - Bruno Zaremba, French footballer (d. 2018)
  - Grace Hightower, American philanthropist, actress and singer
  - Gregg Jarrett, American lawyer turned journalist
  - Akira Nishino, Japanese soccer player and manager
  - Werner Stocker, German actor (d. 1993)
- April 8
  - Kane Hodder, American actor
  - Barbara Kingsolver, American fiction writer
  - Ricky Bell, American football player (d. 1984)
  - Glen Burtnik, American singer, songwriter, entertainer and multi-instrumentalist
- April 9 – Kate Heyhoe, American food writer
- April 10 – Philip J. Hanlon, American mathematician and computer science, 18th President of Dartmouth College
- April 11
  - Kevin Brady, American politician, Texas's 8th congressional district
  - Michael Callen, American singer-songwriter, composer, author and AIDS activist (d. 1993)
- April 12
  - Fred Ryan, chief executive officer of The Washington Post
  - Jean-Louis Aubert, French musician
- April 13
  - Steve Camp, American Christian musician
  - Hideki Saijo, Japanese singer and actor (d. 2018)
  - José Alperovich, Argentine politician
  - Ole von Beust, German politician
- April 14
  - Don Roos, American screenwriter
  - Binod Chaudhary, Nepalese billionaire businessman, politician and philanthropist
- April 15
  - Tommy Castro, American blues guitarist
  - Dodi Fayed, Egyptian film producer (d. 1997)
- April 16
  - Henri, Grand Duke of Luxembourg
  - DJ Kool Herc, Jamaican American DJ
- April 17
  - Rob Bolland, Dutch musician, songwriter and music producer (Bolland & Bolland)
  - Pete Shelley, English punk rock singer-songwriter, musician (Buzzcocks) (d. 2018)
  - Dave VanDam, American voice actor and impressionist (d. 2018)
- April 18 – Bobby Castillo, American baseball player (d. 2014)
- April 19 – Ahmoo Angeconeb, Canadian Ojibwe artist (d. 2017)
- April 20
  - Rotimi Fani-Kayode, Nigerian-born British photographer (d. 1989)
  - Svante Pääbo, Swedish evolutionary geneticist, recipient of the Nobel Prize in Physiology or Medicine
- April 21
  - Ebiet G. Ade, Indonesian singer and songwriter
  - Toninho Cerezo, Brazilian footballer and coach
- April 23
  - Judy Davis, Australian actress
  - Ludovikus Simanullang, Indonesian Roman Catholic bishop (d. 2018)
  - Fumi Hirano, Japanese voice actress and essayist
  - Tony Miles, English chess player (d. 2001)
- April 24 – John de Mol, Dutch media tycoon
- April 25
  - Karon O. Bowdre, United States District Judge of the United States District Court for the Northern District of Alabama.
  - John Nunn, English chess player and mathematician
  - Parviz Parastui, Iranian actor
- April 26
  - Chen Daoming, Chinese actor
  - Gisele Ben-Dor, Uruguayan-American-Israeli orchestra conductor
  - Rod Blum, American businessman and politician
- April 27
  - James Risen, American Pulitzer Prize-winning investigative reporter and author
  - Eric Schmidt, American software engineer and businessman, CEO of Google (2001–2011)
  - Jing Yidan, Chinese television host
- April 28
  - Saeb Erekat, Palestinian diplomat (d. 2020)
  - Eddie Jobson, English musician
  - William Kentridge, South African artist
- April 29
  - Richard Epcar, American voice actor
  - Kate Mulgrew, American actress
  - Yūko Tanaka, Japanese actress
- April 30 – Zlatko Topčić, Bosnian writer and screenwriter

=== May ===
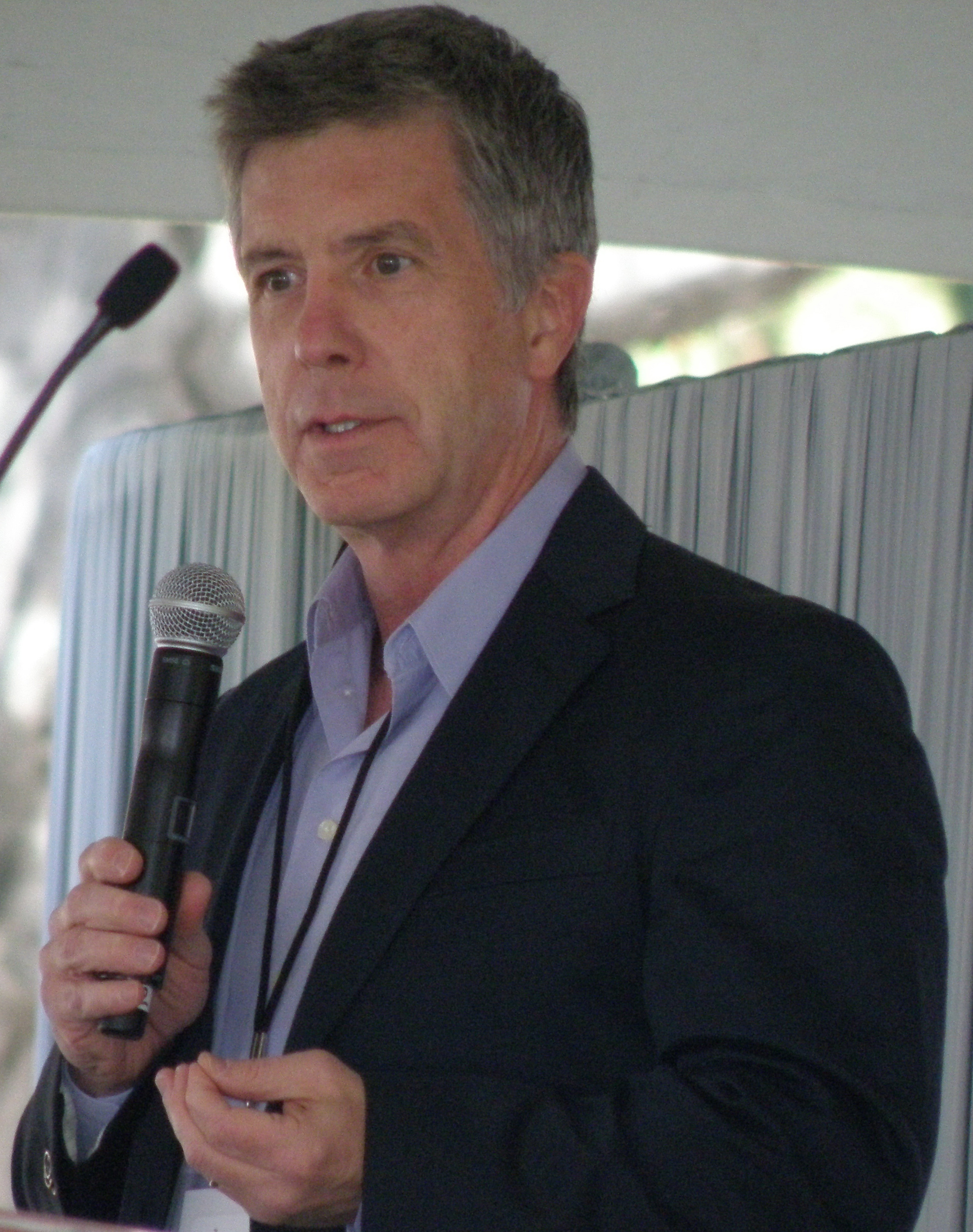
Tom Bergeron

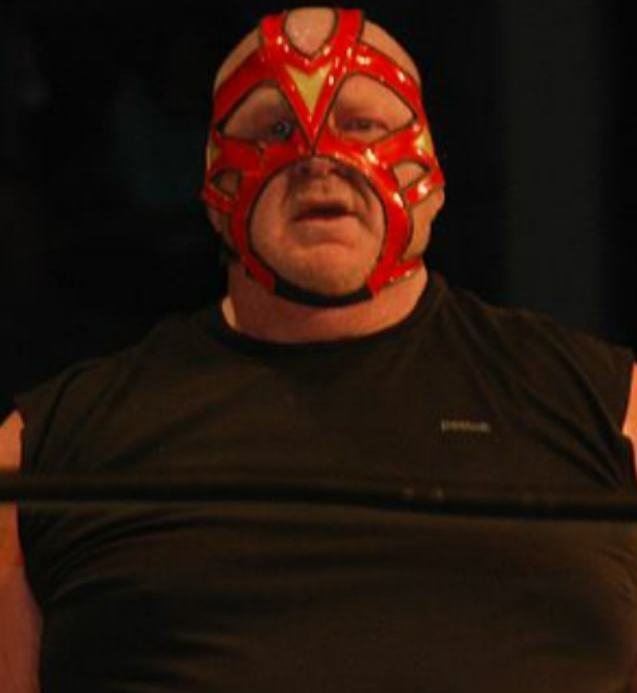
Big Van Vader

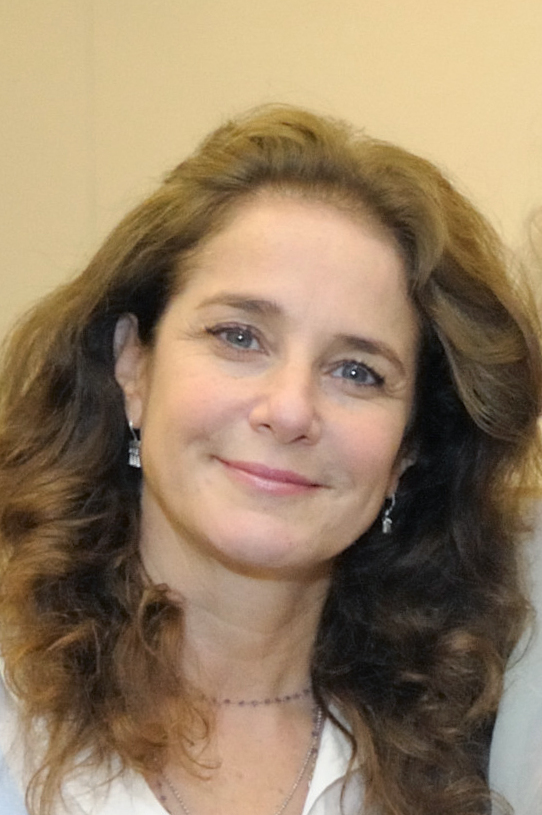
Debra Winger

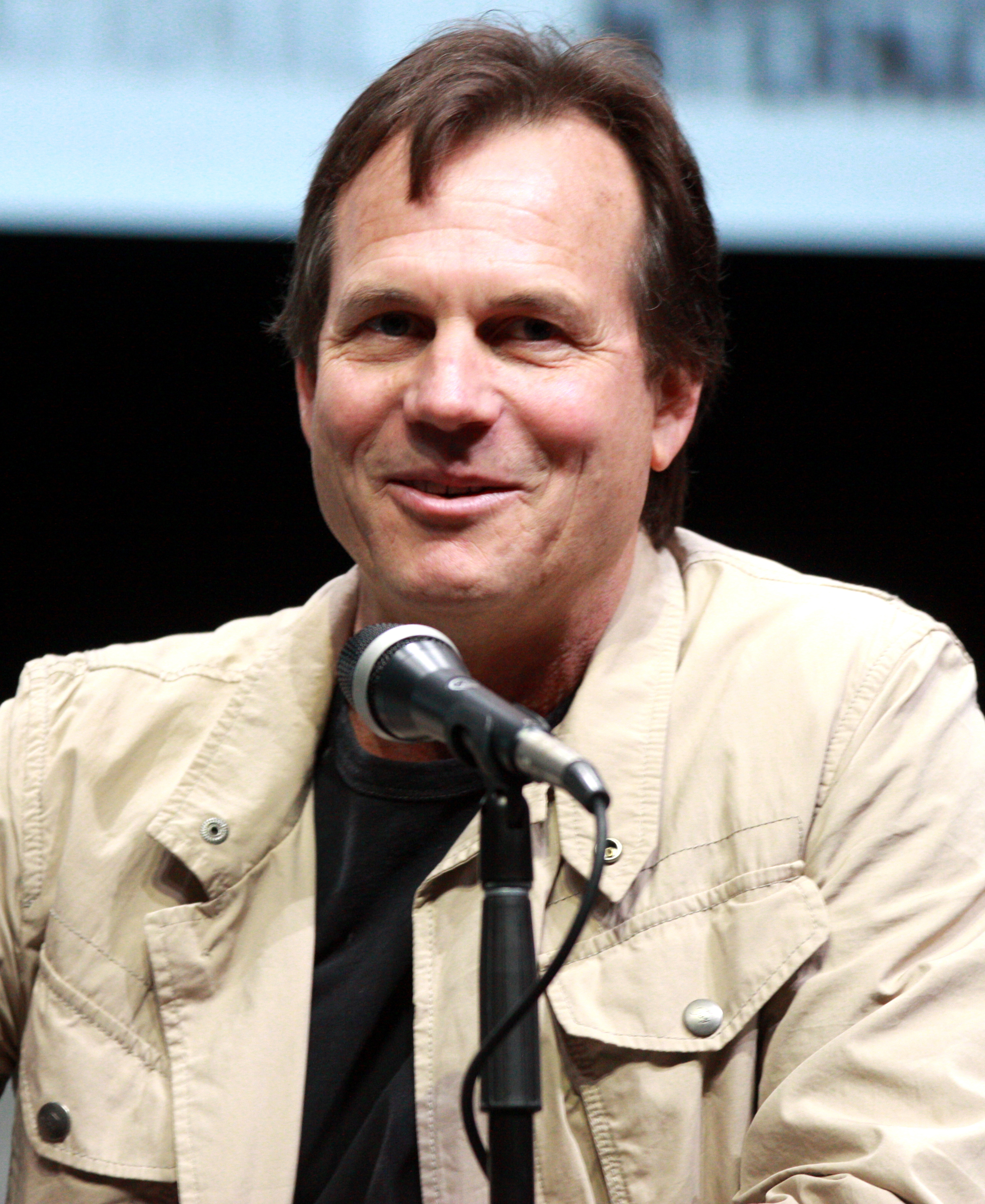
Bill Paxton

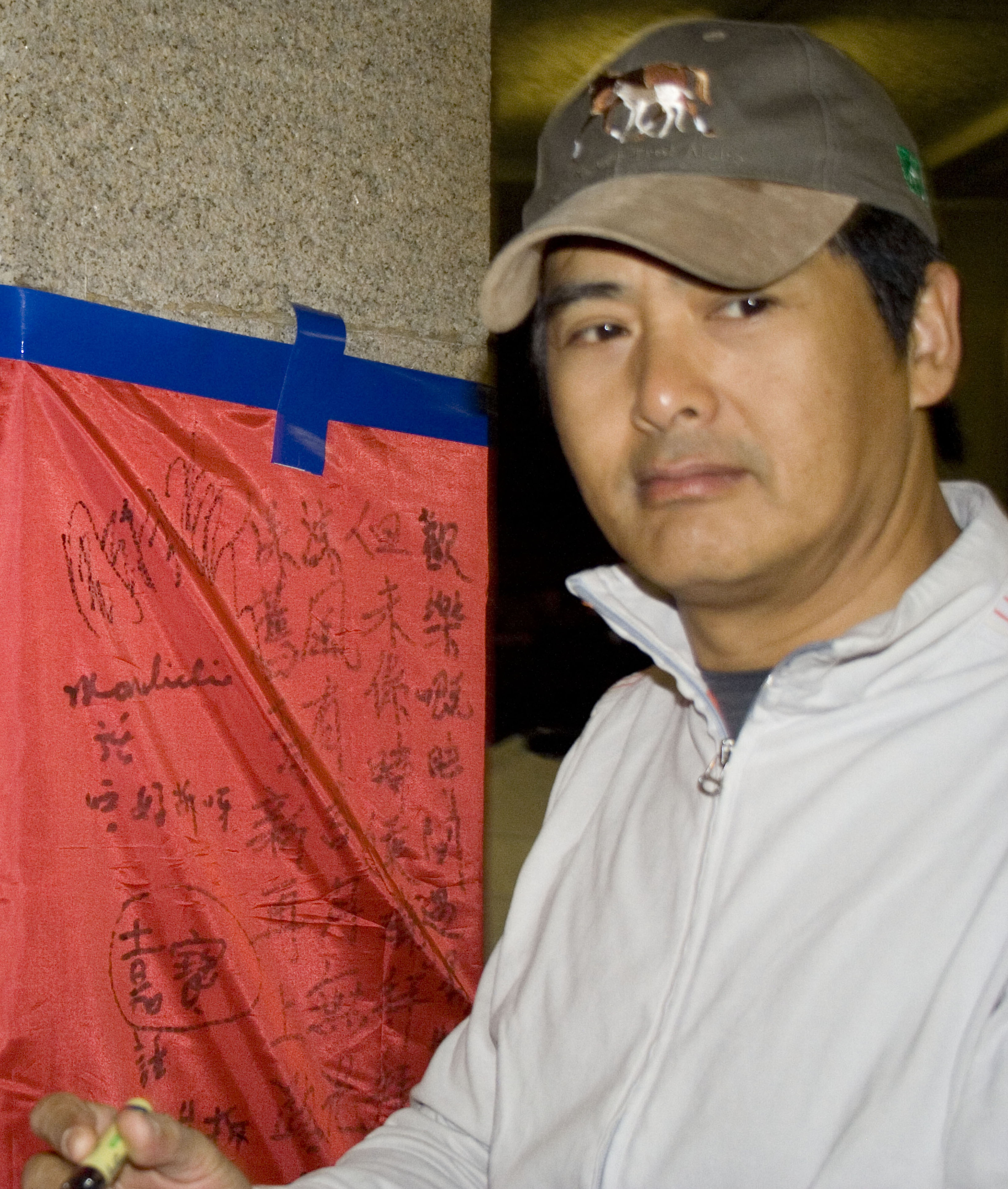
Chow Yun-fat

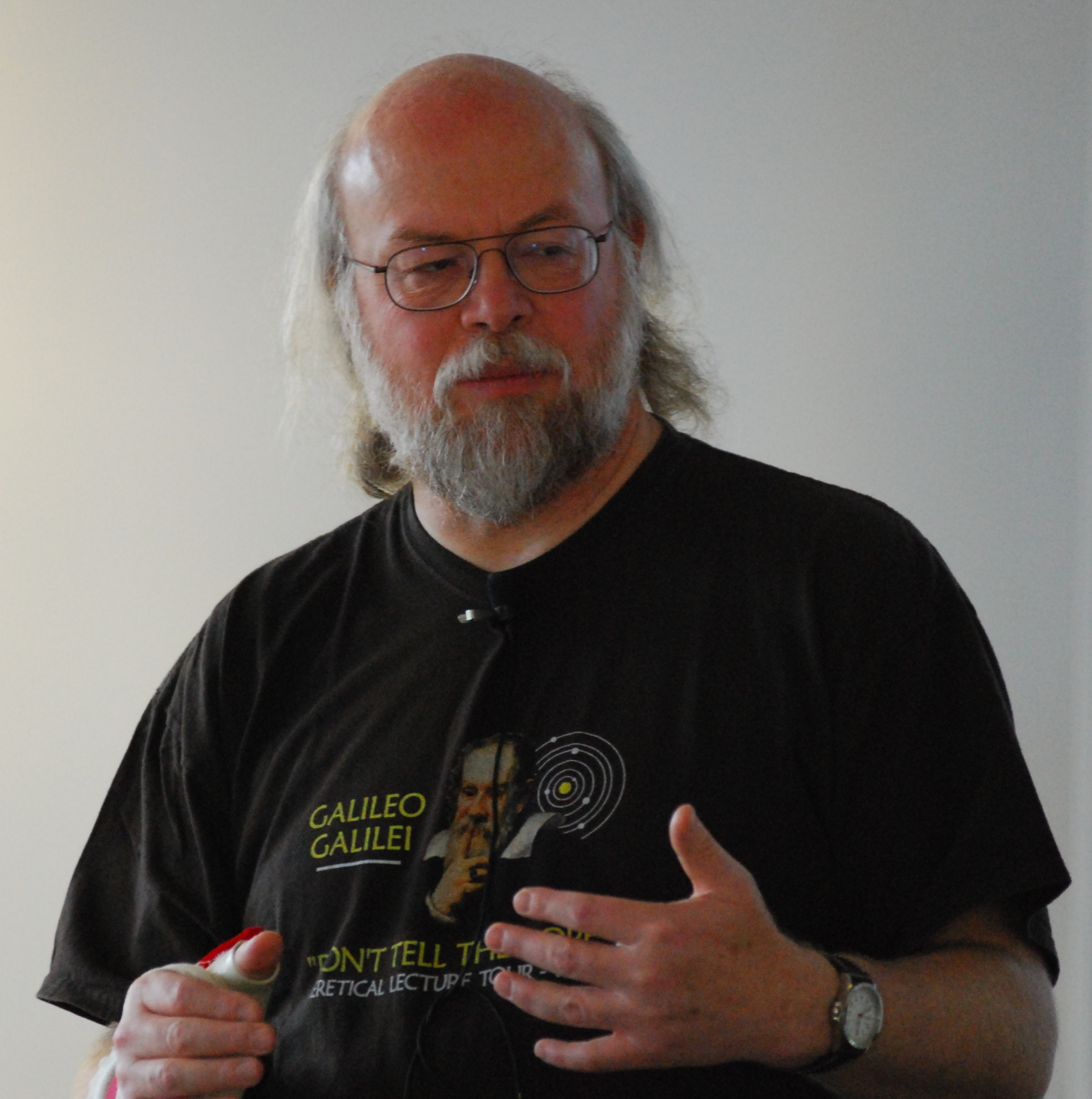
James Gosling

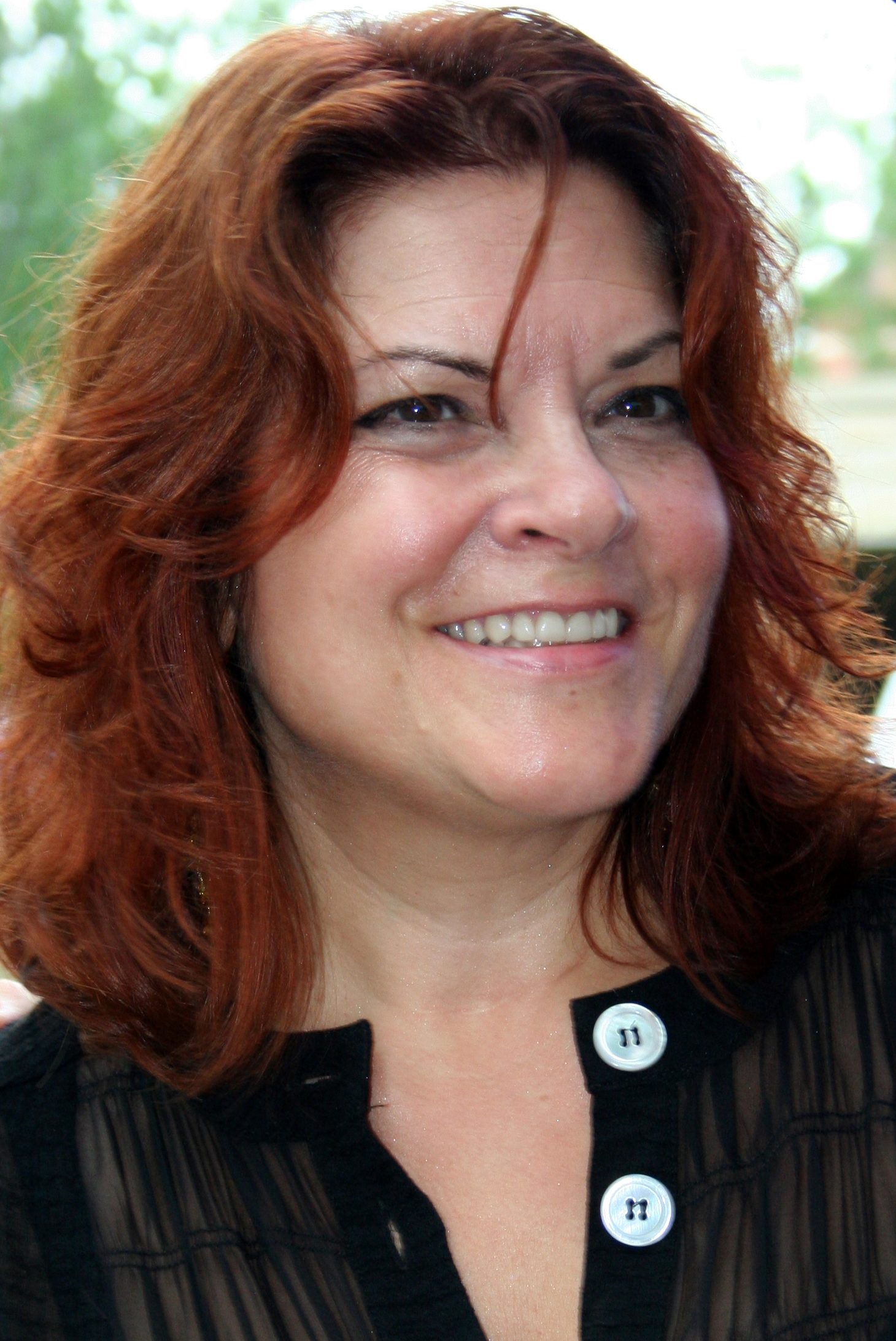
Rosanne Cash

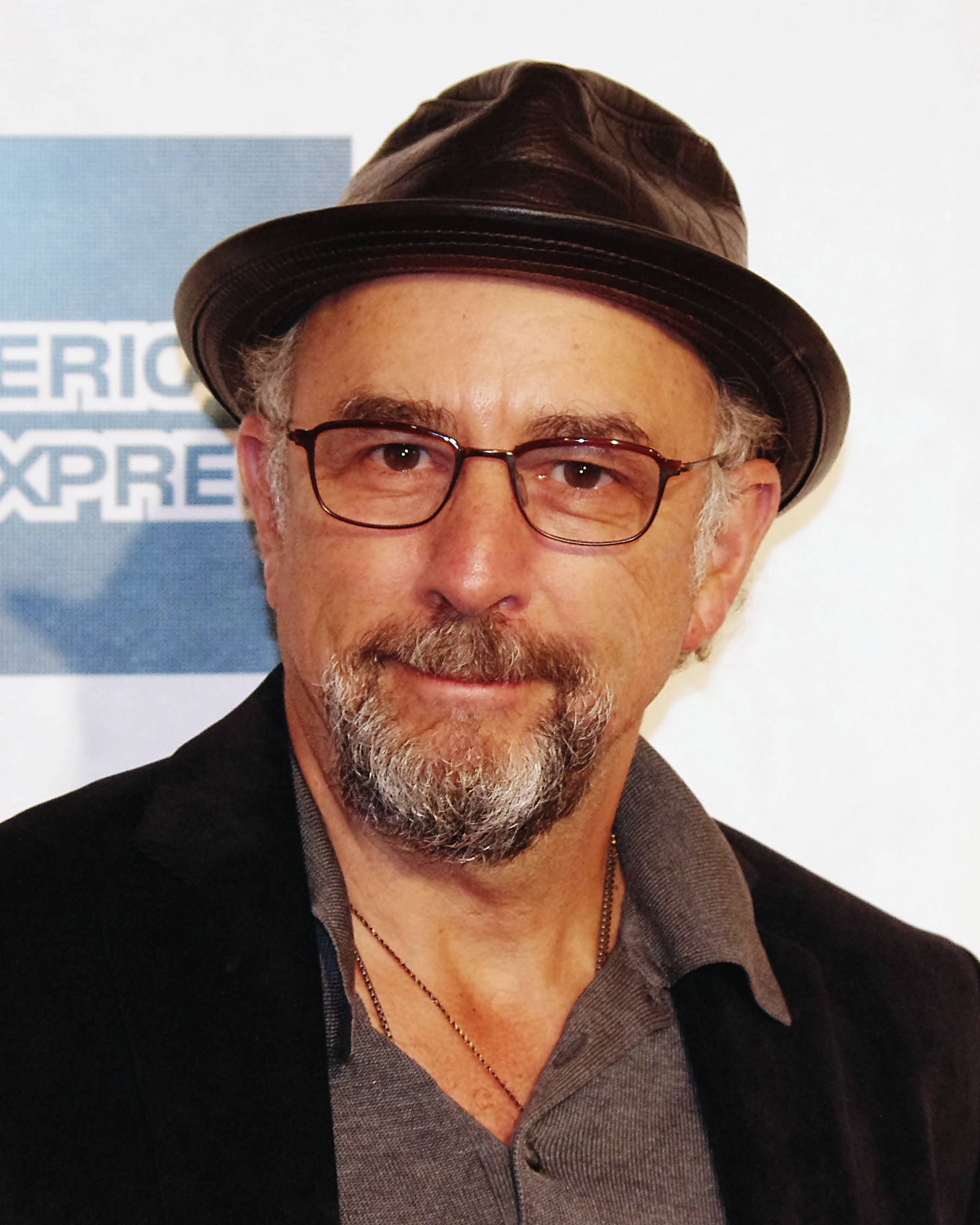
Richard Schiff

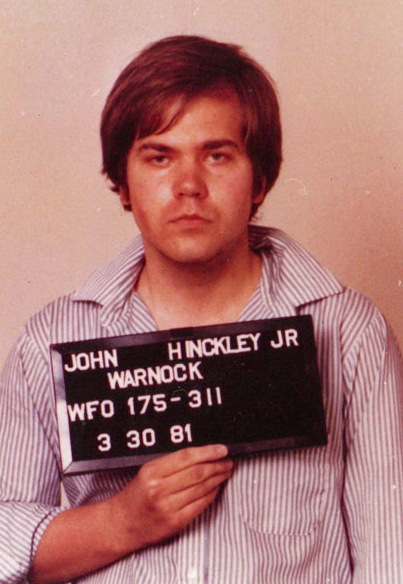
John Hinckley Jr.

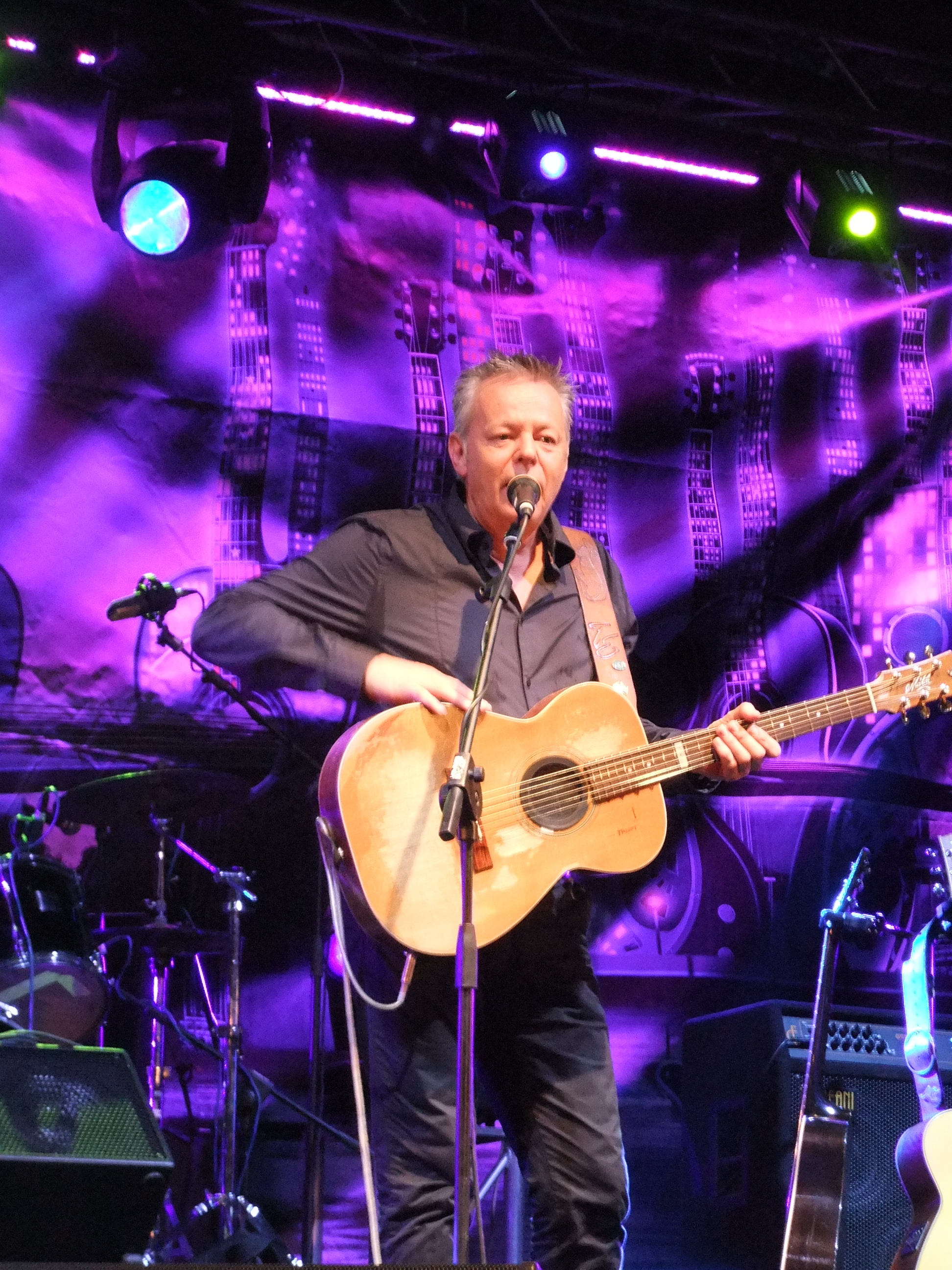
Tommy Emmanuel

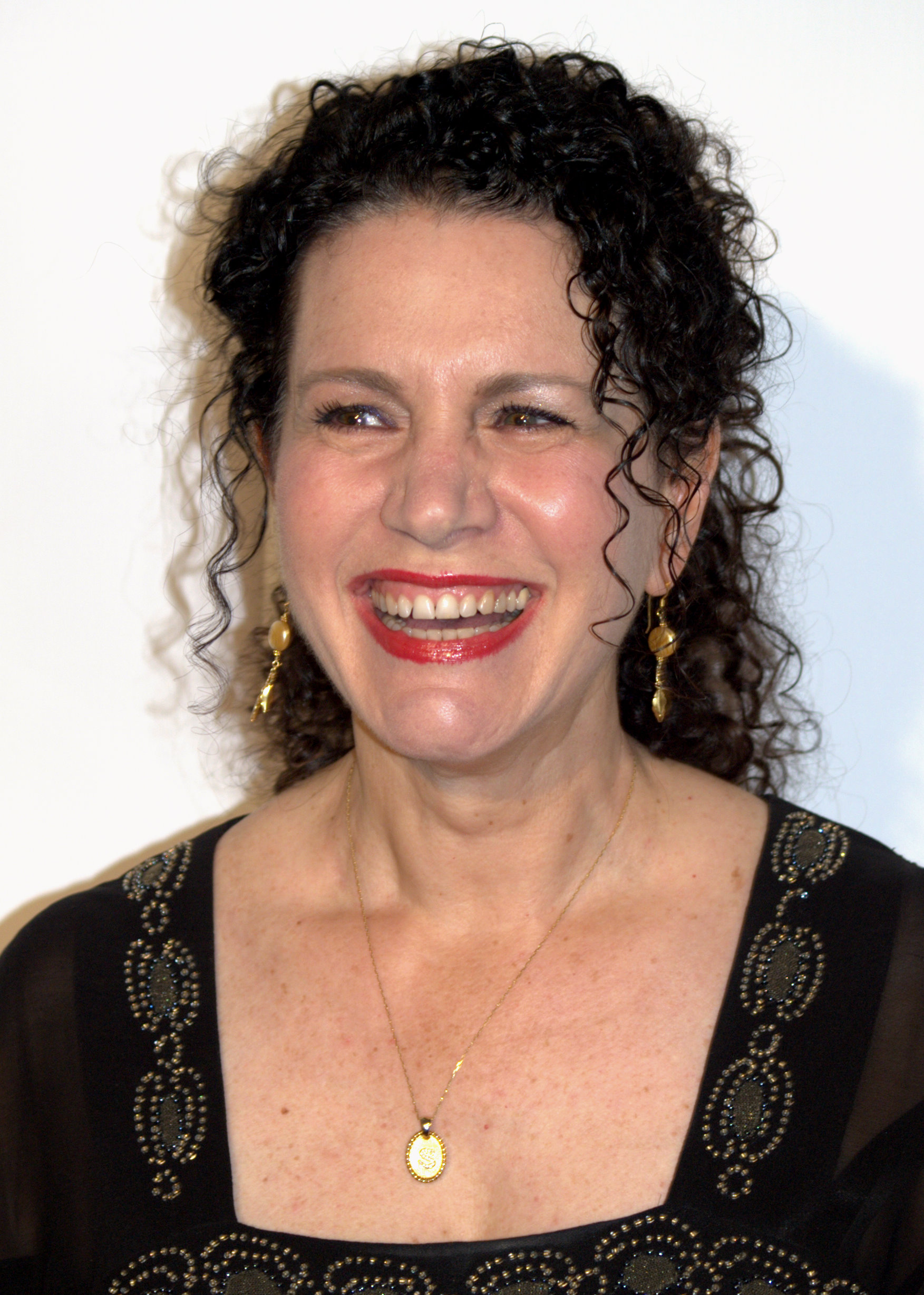
Susie Essman

- May 1 – Julie Pietri, French singer
- May 2
  - Willie Miller, Scottish footballer
  - Donatella Versace, Italian designer
  - Dave Winer, American software pioneer
- May 4
  - Avram Grant, Israeli football manager
  - Robert Ellis Orrall, American singer
- May 5 – Jon Butcher, American rock/blues songwriter, guitarist and freelance multimedia producer
- May 6
  - Tom Bergeron, American television host
  - Kim Bullard, American keyboardist, songwriter, record producer and film composer
- May 7
  - Peter Reckell, American actor
  - Alan Garber, American physician, health economist and academic
- May 8
  - Betsy Baker, American actress
  - Danny Barber, American serial killer, necrophile and burglar (d. 1999)
  - Meles Zenawi, 10th Prime Minister of Ethiopia and 3rd President of Ethiopia (d. 2012)
- May 9
  - Kevin Peter Hall, American actor (d. 1991)
  - Anne Sofie von Otter, Swedish mezzo-soprano
- May 10
  - Chris Berman, American sports broadcaster
  - Mark David Chapman, American murderer of musician John Lennon
- May 12 – Kix Brooks, American country artist, actor and producer
- May 13
  - María Cecilia Botero, Colombian actress, television presenter and journalist
  - Garry Bushell, English columnist, journalist, television presenter, author, musician and political activist
- May 14
  - Big Van Vader, American professional wrestler and football player (d. 2018)
  - Dave Hoover, American comic book artist and animator (d. 2011)
  - Robert Tapert, American television producer
- May 15
  - Anatoly Antonov, Russian military official and diplomat
  - Mohamed Brahmi, Tunisian politician (assassinated 2013)
  - Brenda Sue Brown, American murdered child
  - Lee Horsley, American film, television and theater actor
  - Hege Skjeie, Norwegian political scientist and feminist (d. 2018)
- May 16
  - Dean Corren, American politician and scientist (d. 2023)
  - Olga Korbut, Soviet gymnast
  - Olli Kortekangas, Finnish composer
  - Jack Morris, American baseball player
  - Richard Phillips, American merchant mariner and captain of the MV Maersk Alabama
  - Debra Winger, American actress
  - Edgar Bronfman Jr., American businessman, filmmaker, theater producer and media executive
- May 17
  - Bill Paxton, American actor (d. 2017)
  - Chan Kong Choy, Malaysian politician and businessman
- May 18
  - Chow Yun-fat, Hong Kong actor
  - Vincent Chin, Chinese-American draftsman murdered in a racially motivated assault (d. 1982)
- May 19
  - Mark Staff Brandl, American and Swiss artist and art historian
  - James Gosling, Canadian software engineer
  - Th. Emil Homerin, American theologian
  - Fátima Bezerra, Brazilian politician
- May 20
  - Diego Abatantuono, Italian actor
  - Steve George, American keyboardist and singer
  - Zbigniew Preisner, Polish film composer
  - Anton Corbijn, Dutch photographer and director
- May 21 – Sergei Shoigu, Russian politician, (Russian Defence Minister)
- May 22
  - Chalmers Alford, American jazz guitarist (d. 2008)
  - Iva Davies, Australian singer and musician; lead singer of Icehouse
  - Dale Winton, English radio DJ and television presenter (d. 2018)
- May 23 – Mary Black, Irish folk singer
- May 24 – Rosanne Cash, American entertainer
- May 25
  - Connie Sellecca, American actress
  - Alistair Burt, British politician
- May 26 – Doris Dörrie, German actress and screenplay writer
- May 27 – Richard Schiff, American actor and comedian
- May 28
  - Károly Bezdek, Hungarian-Canadian mathematician
  - Geoffrey A. Landis, American aerospace engineer and author
- May 29
  - John Hinckley Jr., attempted assassin of Ronald Reagan
  - Mike Porcaro, American bass guitarist (Toto) (d. 2015)
- May 30
  - Brian Kobilka, American physiologist
  - Paresh Rawal, Indian actor
  - Jake Roberts, American professional wrestler and actor
- May 31
  - Laura Baugh, American golfer
  - Tommy Emmanuel, Australian guitarist
  - Susie Essman, American actress
  - Lynne Truss, English writer

=== June ===
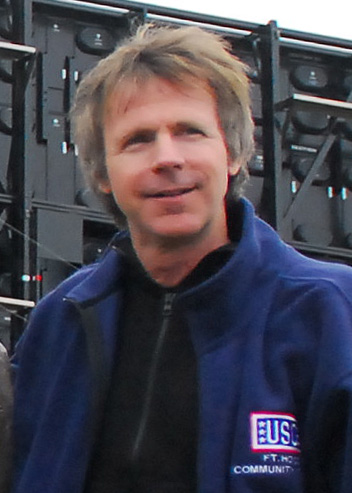
Dana Carvey

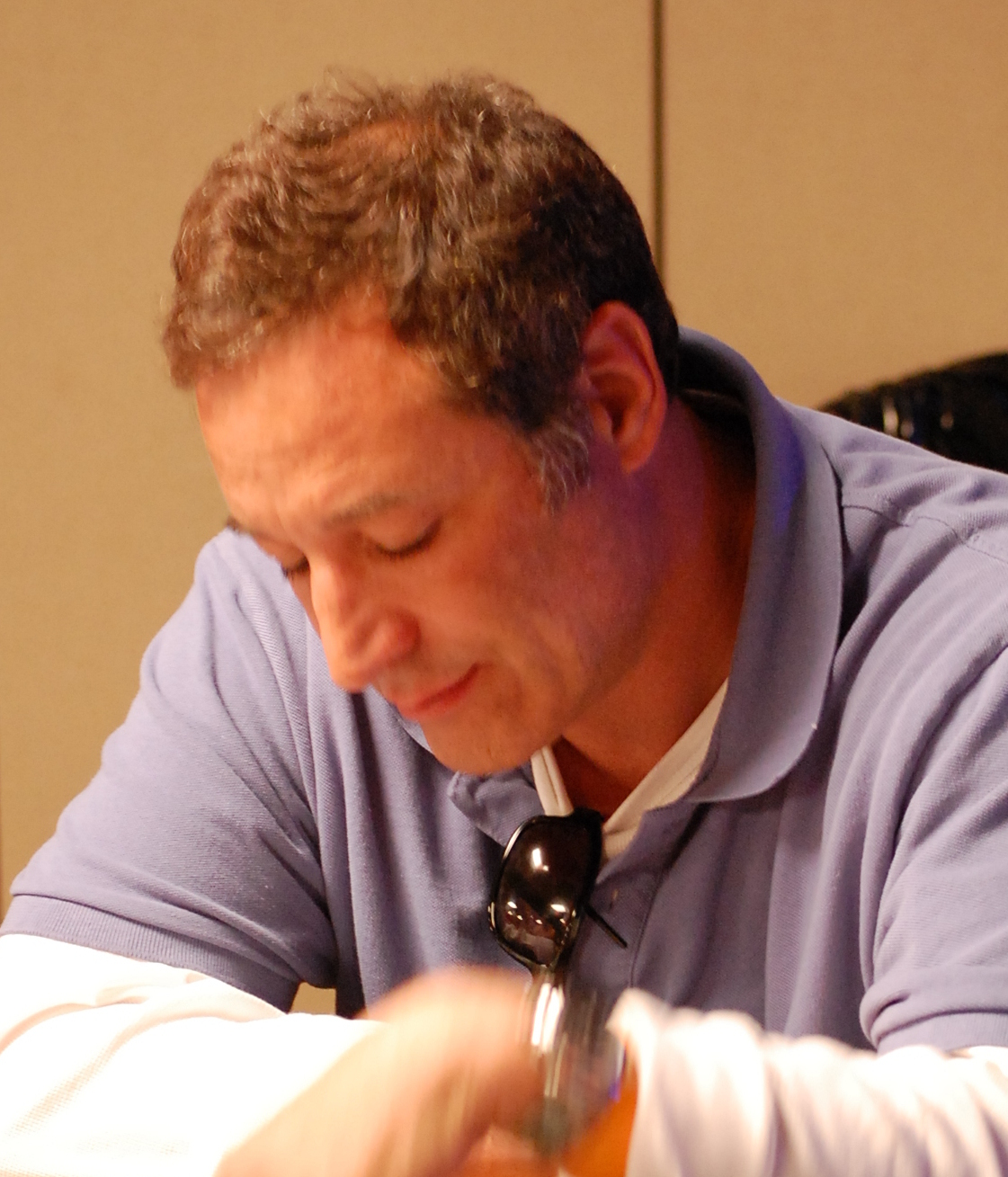
Sam Simon

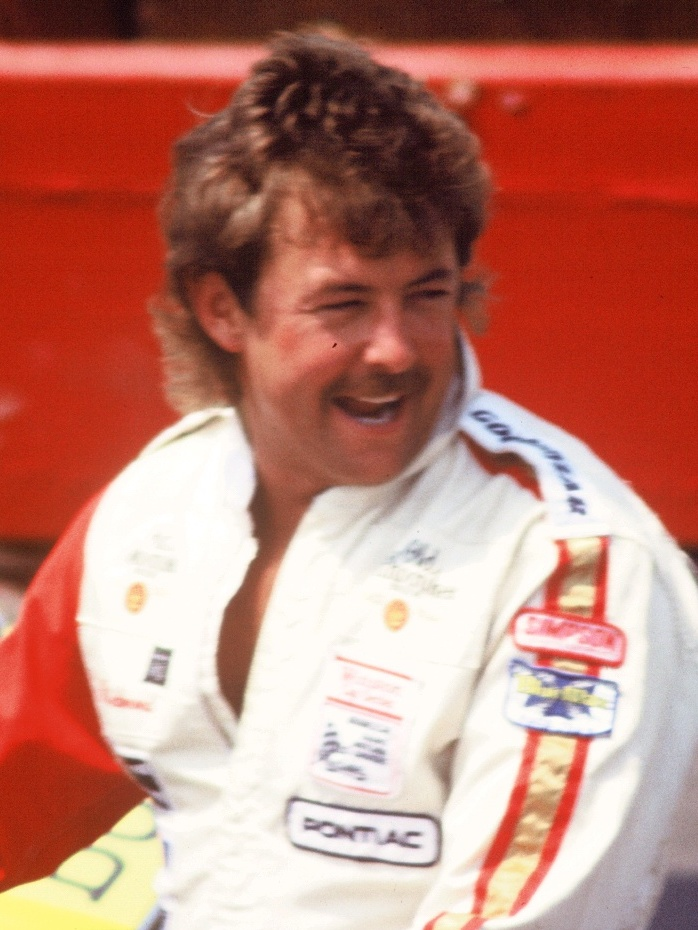
Tim Richmond

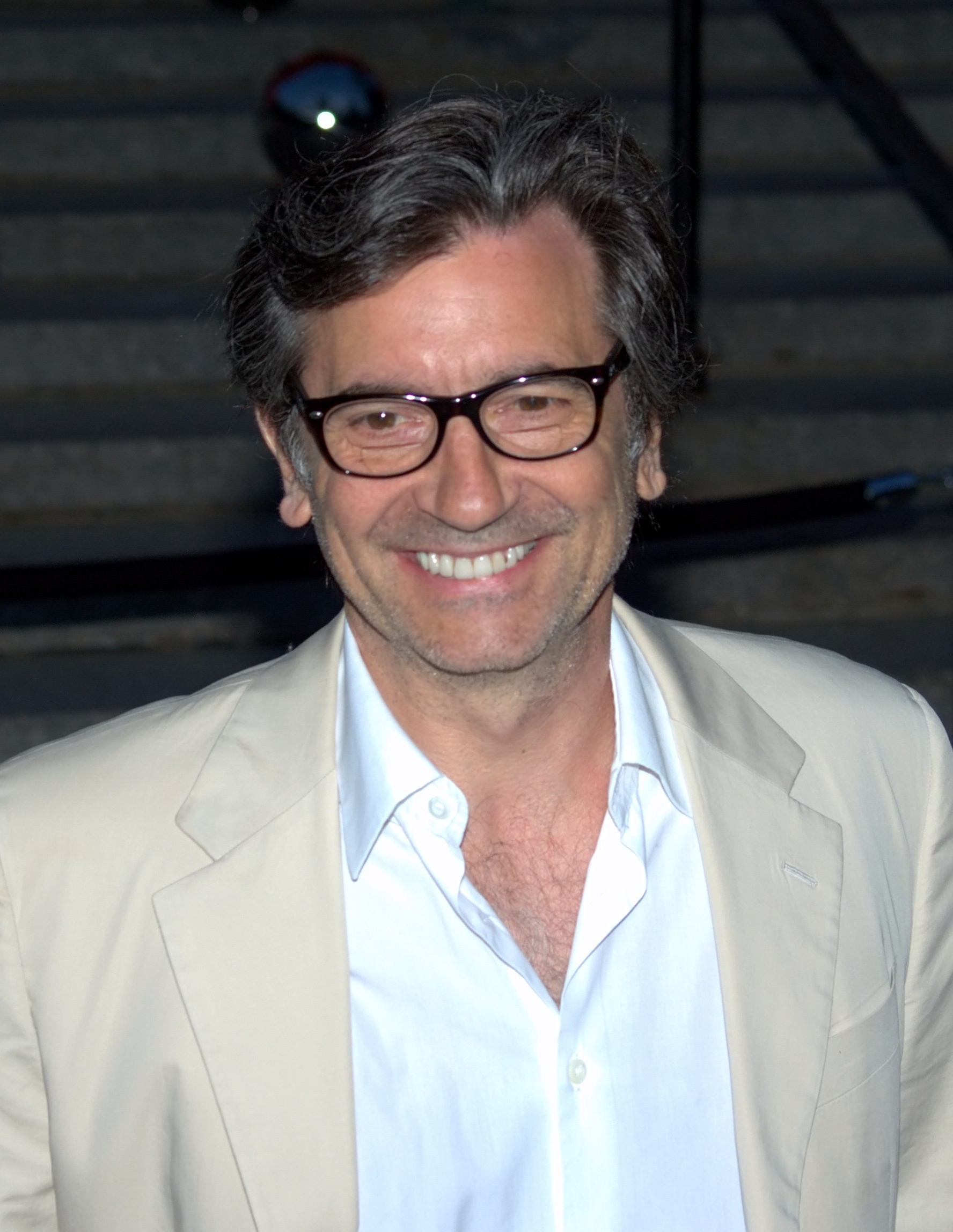
Griffin Dunne

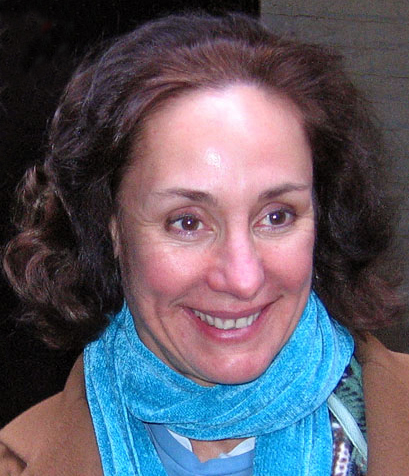
Laurie Metcalf

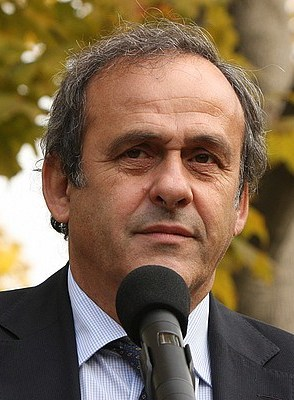
Michel Platini

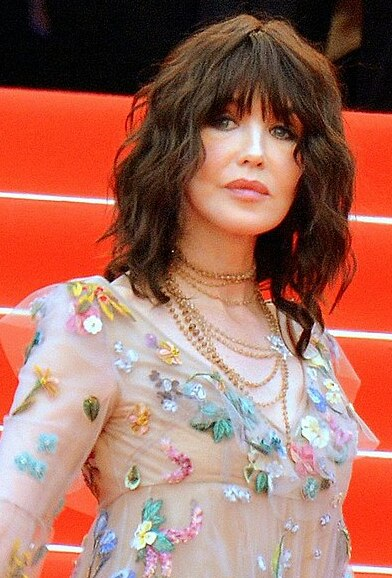
Isabelle Adjani

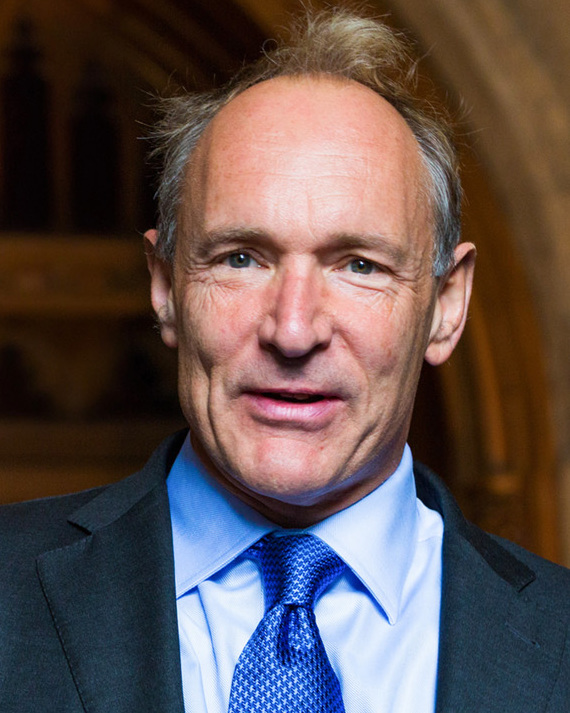
Sir Tim Berners-Lee

- June 1
  - Chiyonofuji Mitsugu, Japanese sumo wrestler (58th Yokozuna grand champion) (d. 2016)
  - David Schultz, American professional wrestler
  - Suresh Angadi, Indian politician (d. 2020)
- June 2 – Dana Carvey, American actor and comedian
- June 3
  - Daniel Filmus, Argentine politician, member of the Chamber of Deputies of Argentina
  - Paul Stagg Coakley, American prelate of the Roman Catholic Church
  - Louis H. Schiff, retired American judge, law school professor.
- June 4
  - Johnny Alegre, Filipino jazz guitarist
  - Precious, Canadian wrestling valet
  - Mary Testa, American film actress
- June 5 – Fernando Borrego Linares, Cuban singer and songwriter (aka Polo Montañez)
- June 6
  - Sandra Bernhard, American comedian, actress, author and singer
  - Chris Nyman, American baseball player
  - Sam Simon, American filmmaker (d. 2015)
- June 7
  - Jo Gilbert, English film producer and casting director (d. 2018)
  - Bob Beatty, American football coach
  - Tim Richmond, American race car driver (d. 1989)
  - Dean Sullivan, English actor and director (d. 2023)
  - William Forsythe, American actor
  - Jon Balke, Norwegian jazz pianist
- June 8
  - Duke Aiona, 10th Lieutenant Governor of Hawaii
  - Tim Berners-Lee, English computer scientist and World Wide Web inventor
  - Griffin Dunne, American actor and director
  - José Antonio Camacho, Spanish footballer and manager
- June 9 – Carlos Manuel Urzúa Macías, Mexican politician and academic (d. 2024)
- June 10
  - Floyd Bannister, American baseball player
  - Andrew Stevens, American actor, producer and director
- June 11 – Yuriy Sedykh, Ukrainian hammer thrower (d. 2021)
- June 12
  - Jagadish Kumar, Indian Malayalam film actor
  - William Langewiesche, American author
- June 13 – John E. Jones III, American justice
- June 14
  - Tito Rojas, Puerto Rican salsa singer and songwriter (d. 2020)
  - Kim Lankford, American actress, businesswoman and horse wrangler
  - Paul O'Grady (also known as "Lily Savage"), English talk show host, comedian and drag queen (d. 2023)
- June 15
  - István Levente Garai, Hungarian physician and politician (d. 2018)
  - Polly Draper, American actress, screenwriter, playwright, producer and director
  - David A. Kennedy, son of Robert F. Kennedy (d. 1984)
  - Julie Hagerty, American actress
  - Marjorie Agosín, Chilean-American writer and women's rights activist
  - Brent Anderson, American comics artist
- June 16
  - Laurie Metcalf, American actress
  - Anatoly Chubais, Russian politician and economist
- June 18
  - Sandy Allen, American, world's tallest woman (d. 2008)
  - Kevin Burns, American television and film producer, director and screenwriter (d. 2020)
- June 20 – Tor Nørretranders, Danish author
- June 21
  - Aloysius Amwano, Nauruan politician
  - Tim Bray, Canadian computer programmer
  - Jean-Pierre Mader, French singer-songwriter
  - Leigh McCloskey, American actor
  - Michel Platini, French football player and President of UEFA
- June 22 – Choi Kyoung-hwan, South Korean politician; Prime Minister of South Korea
- June 23
  - Jean Tigana, Malian-French international footballer
  - Glenn Danzig, American rock singer (The Misfits, Samhain, Danzig)
- June 24 – Nobuhiro Kiyotaki, Japanese economist and professor
- June 25 – Víctor Manuel Vucetich, Mexican footballer and manager
- June 26
  - Gedde Watanabe, American actor and comedian
  - Yoko Gushiken, Japanese WBA light flyweight champion boxer
  - Mick Jones, English punk rock guitarist (The Clash)
  - Joey Baron, American avant-garde jazz drummer
- June 27 – Isabelle Adjani, French actress
- June 29 – Christopher A. Bray, American politician and businessman
- June 30
  - Egils Levits, President of Latvia
  - Brian Burke, American-Canadian ice hockey executive

=== July ===
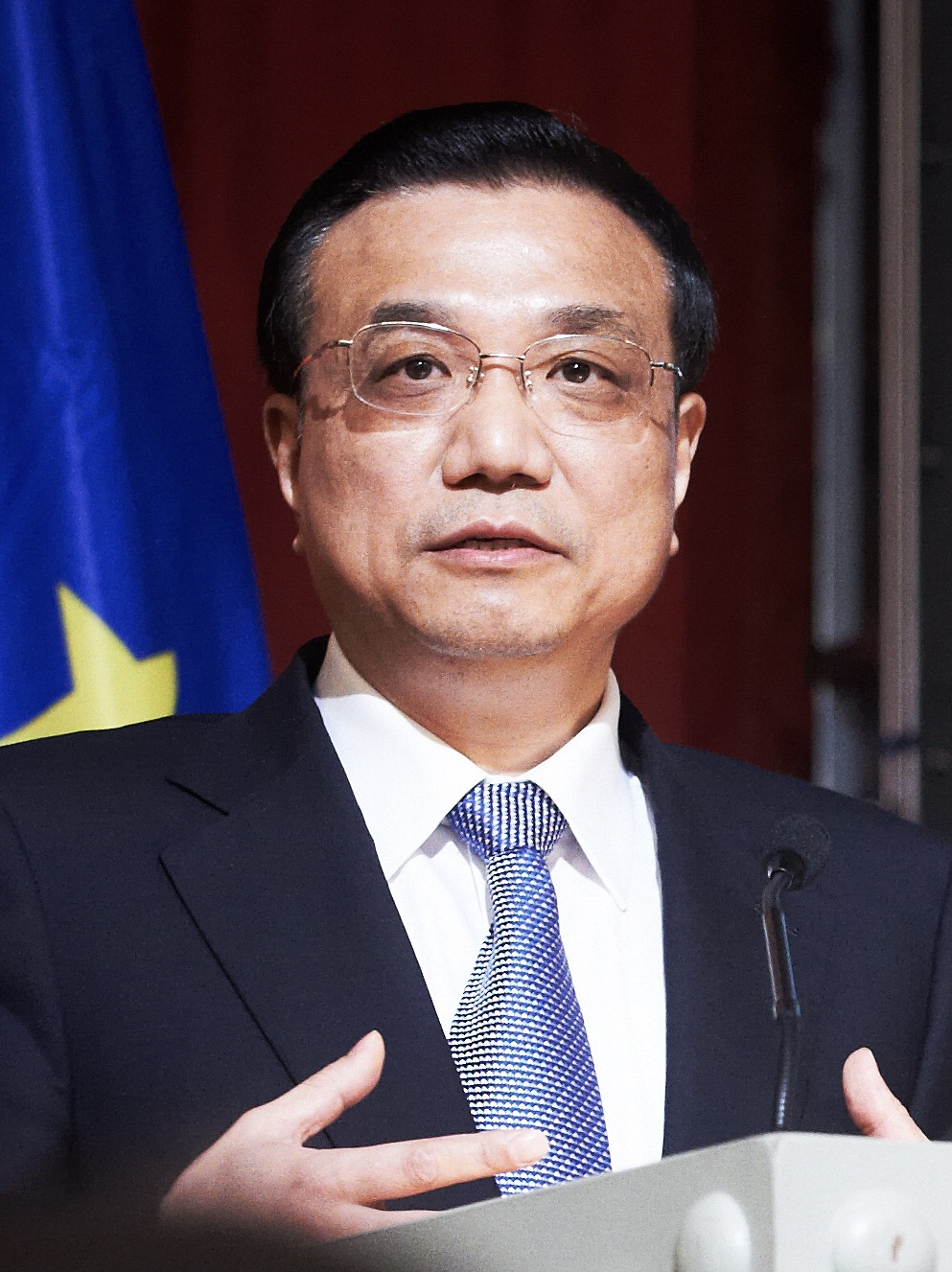
Li Keqiang

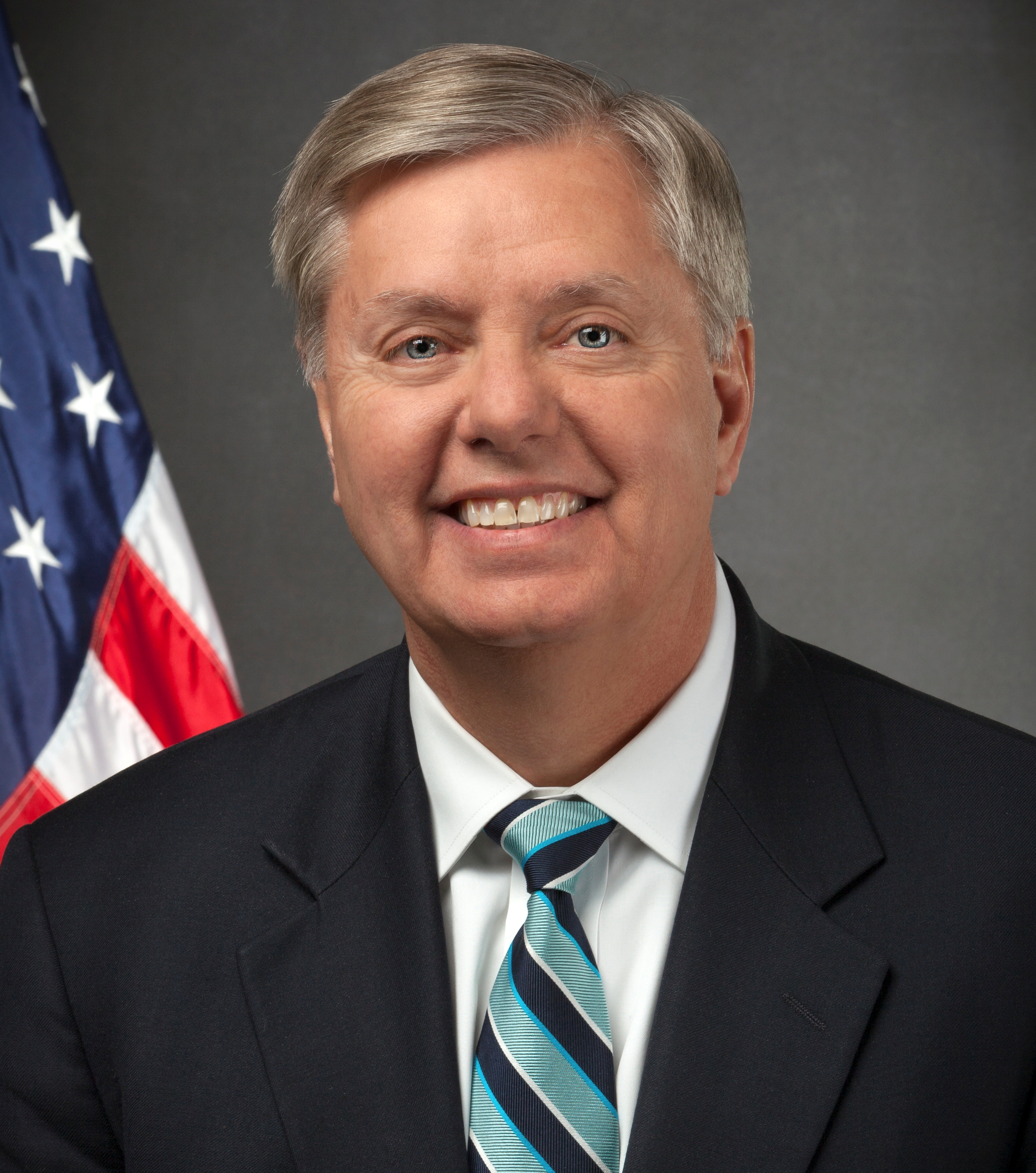
Lindsey Graham

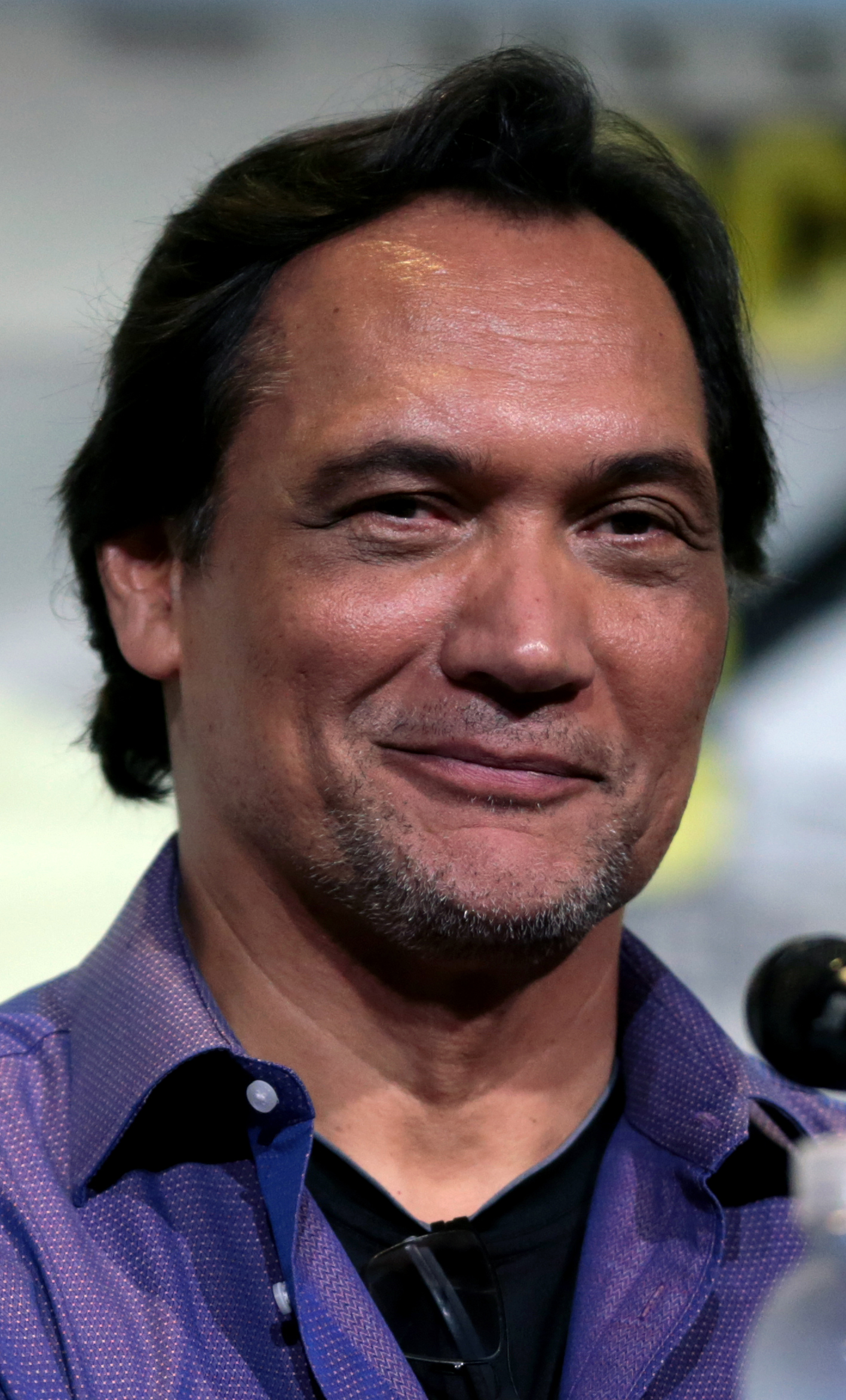
Jimmy Smits

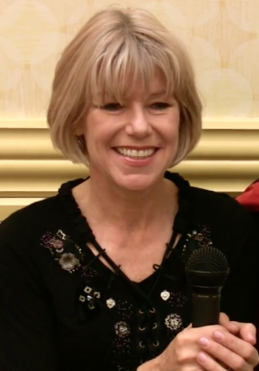
Adrienne King

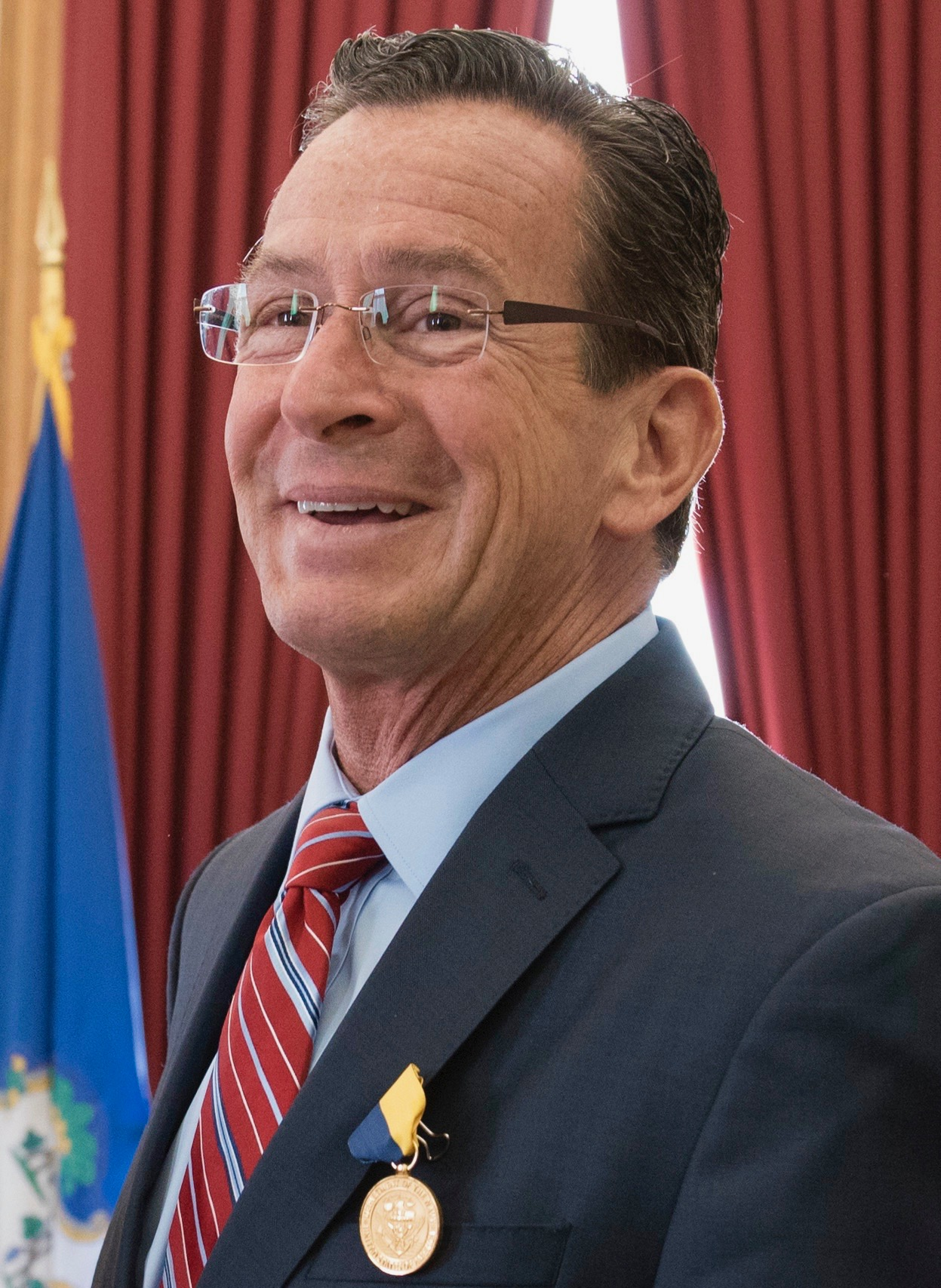
Dannel Malloy

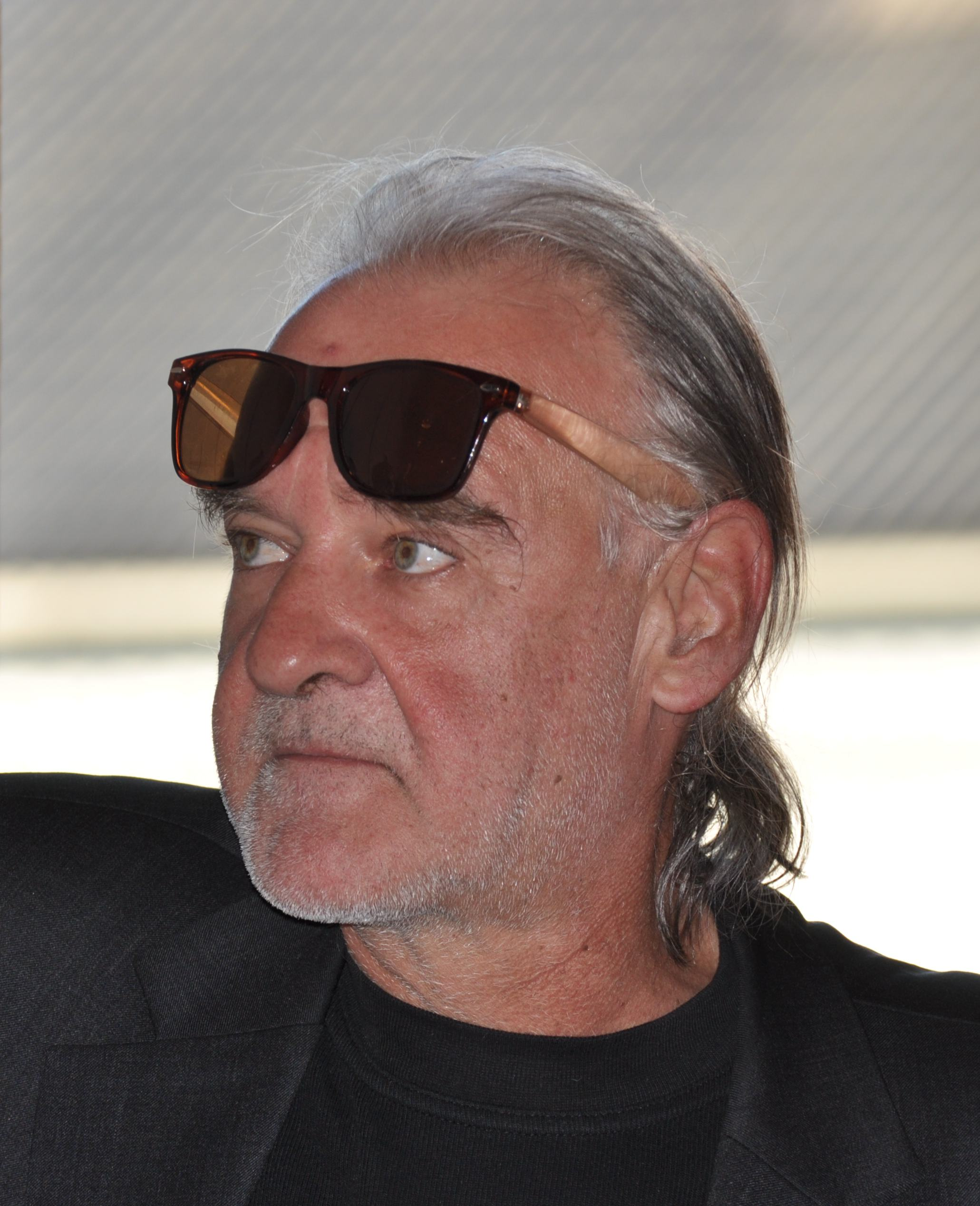
Béla Tarr

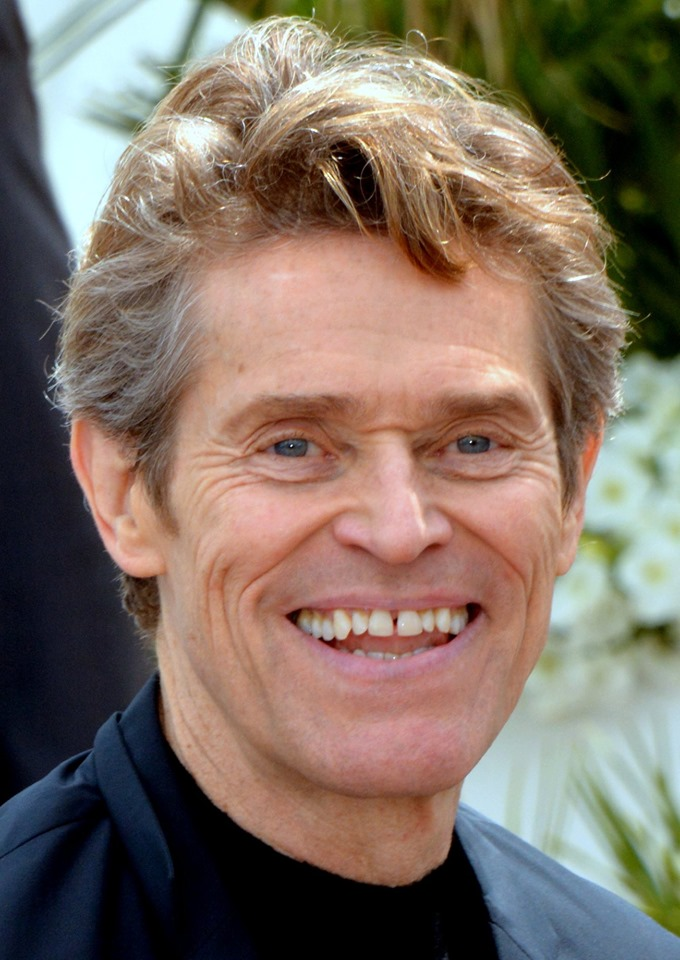
Willem Dafoe

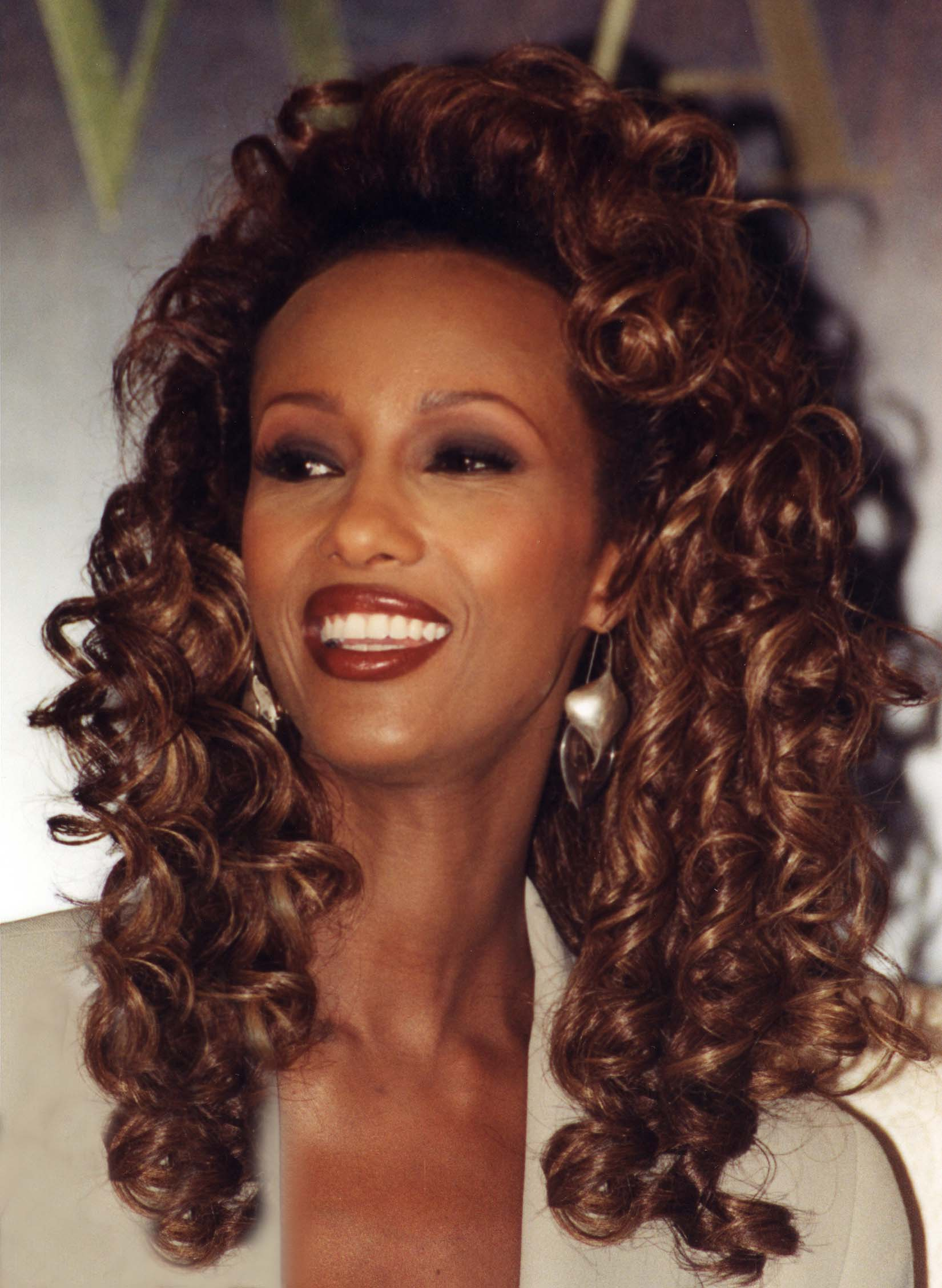
Iman

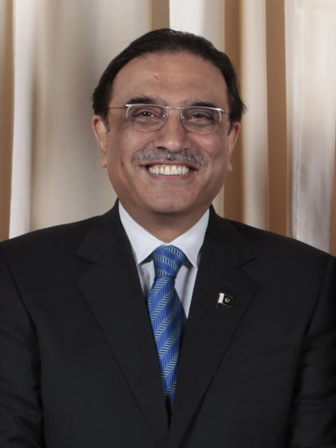
Asif Ali Zardari

- July 1
  - Augusto De Luca, Italian photographer
  - Sanma Akashiya, Japanese comedian and actor
  - Nikolai Demidenko, Russian born British classical pianist
  - John S. Chen, Hong Kong-American businessman
  - Christian Estrosi, French sportsman and politician
  - Li Keqiang, Premier of China (d. 2023)
  - Lisa Scottoline, American novelist
- July 2
  - Andrew Divoff, Venezuelan actor
  - Stephen Walt, American political scientist
  - Sylvie Le Noach, French swimmer
  - Randy Burchell, Canadian ice hockey goaltender
  - Chau Giang, Vietnamese-born American poker player
  - Proceso Alcala, Filipino politician
  - Kim Carr, Australian politician
- July 3
  - Bruce Altman, American actor
  - Matt Keough, American baseball player (d. 2020)
  - Li Keqiang, Chinese economist and politician, premier of China (d. 2023)
- July 4
  - Polly Apfelbaum, American contemporary visual artist
  - Eero Heinäluoma, Finnish politician
  - Víctor Reymundo Nájera, Mexican politician
- July 5
  - Sebastian Barry, Irish playwright, novelist and poet
  - Shannon Bell, Canadian performance philosopher
  - Mia Couto, Mozambican writer
  - Muhammad Aslam Khan Raisani, Pakistani politician
  - Henry Lee Summer, American singer
- July 6
  - Raúl Baduel, Venezuelan politician, general and defense minister (d. 2021)
  - Sherif Ismail, Prime Minister of Egypt (d. 2023)
- July 7
  - Paul Bahoken, Cameroonian footballer
  - Rolf Saxon, American actor
  - Ludo Vika, Dominican actress
- July 8
  - Vladislava Milosavljević, Serbian actress
  - Mihaela Mitrache, Romanian actress
- July 9
  - Lindsey Graham, American politician, lawyer, U.S. Army soldier, U.S. Senator (R-Sc.) and unsuccessful 2016 presidential candidate (d. 2026)
  - Fred Norris, American radio personality
  - Jimmy Smits, American actor
  - Lisa Banes, American actress (d. 2021)
  - Herb Abrams, American wrestling promoter (d. 1996)
- July 10
  - Andrea Bruce, Jamaican athlete
  - Vinnie Curto, American boxer
  - Ray Goff, American football player and coach
  - Dan Newhouse, American politician
  - Bernhard Caesar Einstein, Swiss-American engineer (d. 2008)
- July 11
  - Balaji Sadasivan, Singaporean politician and neurosurgeon
  - Søren Sætter-Lassen, Danish actor
- July 12
  - Timothy Garton Ash, English modern historian
  - Nina Gunke, Swedish actress
  - Tadashi Miyazawa, Japanese voice actor
  - F. Scott Hess, American artist
  - Jimmy LaFave, American singer-songwriter and folk musician (d. 2017)
- July 13
  - Yoshitaka Tamba, Japanese actor
  - Mark Murphy, American football player and executive
  - Kathlene Contres, former United States Navy captain
- July 14 – Ramon Jimenez Jr., Filipino attorney (d. 2020)
- July 15
  - Željko Burić, Croatian politician and doctor
  - Didier Etumba, Congolese Army general
  - Pooran Prakash, Indian politician
- July 16
  - Zohar Argov, Israeli singer (d. 1987)
  - Patrick Bernasconi, French business executive
  - Ritva Elomaa, Finnish female bodybuilding champion, pop singer and politician
  - Janet Huckabee, American politician
  - Saw Swee Leong, Malaysian badminton player
- July 17
  - Janina Buzūnaitė-Žukaitienė, Lithuanian painter, poet, creator of accessories and metal sculptures
  - Fei Yu-ching, Taiwanese singer-songwriter
  - Sylvie Léonard, French-Canadian actress
  - Paul Stamets, American mycologist and entrepreneur
- July 18
  - Bernd Fasching, Austrian painter and sculptor
  - György Matolcsy, Hungarian politician and economist
  - Sergey Zimov, Russian geophysicist and creator of Pleistocene Park
- July 19 – Karen Cheryl, French singer, actress, radio and television presenter
- July 20 – Edgar Zambrano, Venezuelan lawyer and politician
- July 21
  - Adrienne King, American actress
  - Dannel Malloy, American politician
  - Béla Tarr, Hungarian film director (d. 2026)
  - Marcelo Bielsa, Argentine football manager
  - Taco (musician), Dutch musician, actor and entertainer
- July 22
  - Gbenga Bareehu Ashafa, Nigerian politician
  - Willem Dafoe, American actor
- July 25 – Iman, Somali model
- July 26
  - Michele Pillar, American Christian musician
  - Asif Ali Zardari, 11th President of Pakistan
  - Joseph Christopher, American serial killer and mass murderer (d. 1993)
- July 27 – Allan Border, Australian cricketer
- July 29 – Mohammad Barakeh, Israeli Arab politician
- July 31 – Jakie Quartz, French singer

=== August ===
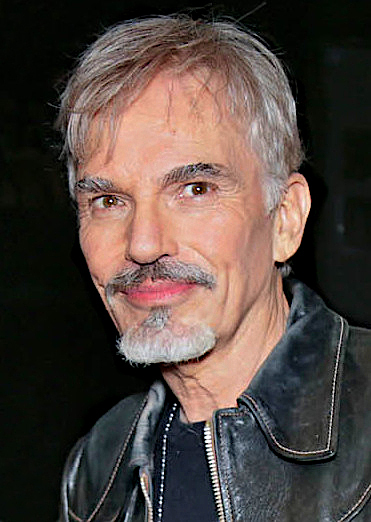
Billy Bob Thornton

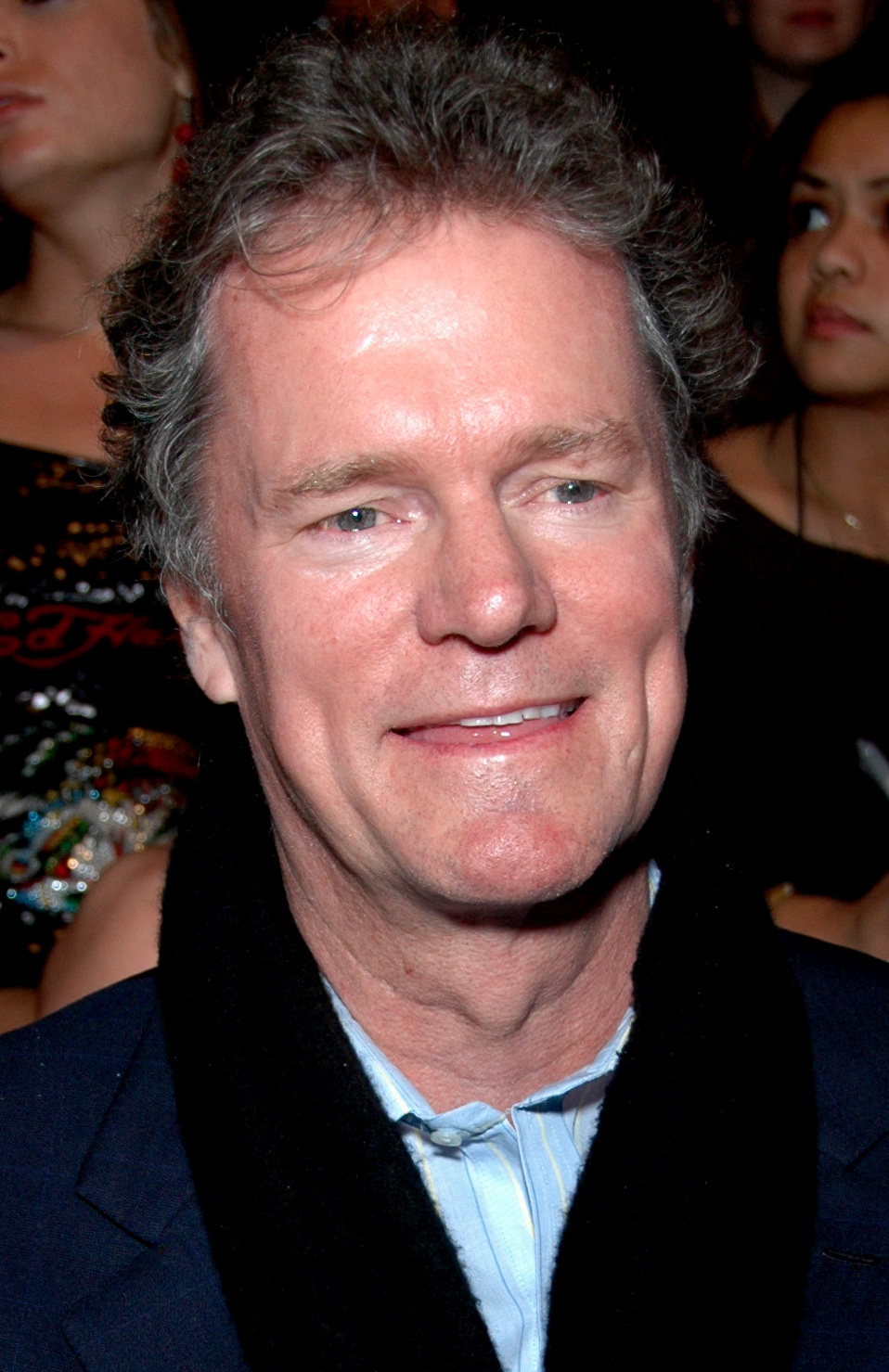
Richard Hilton

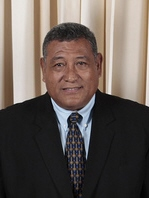
Apisai Ielemia

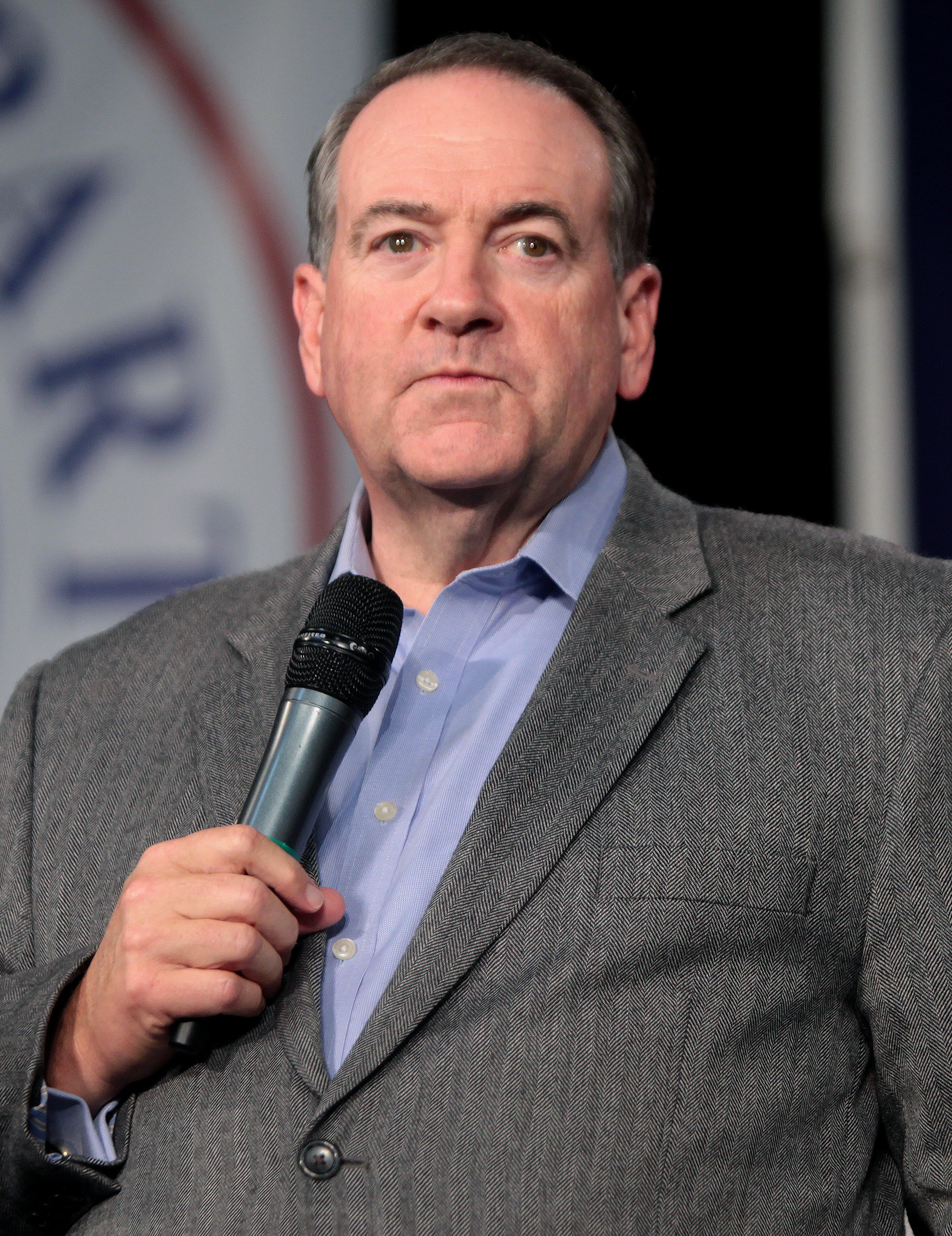
Mike Huckabee

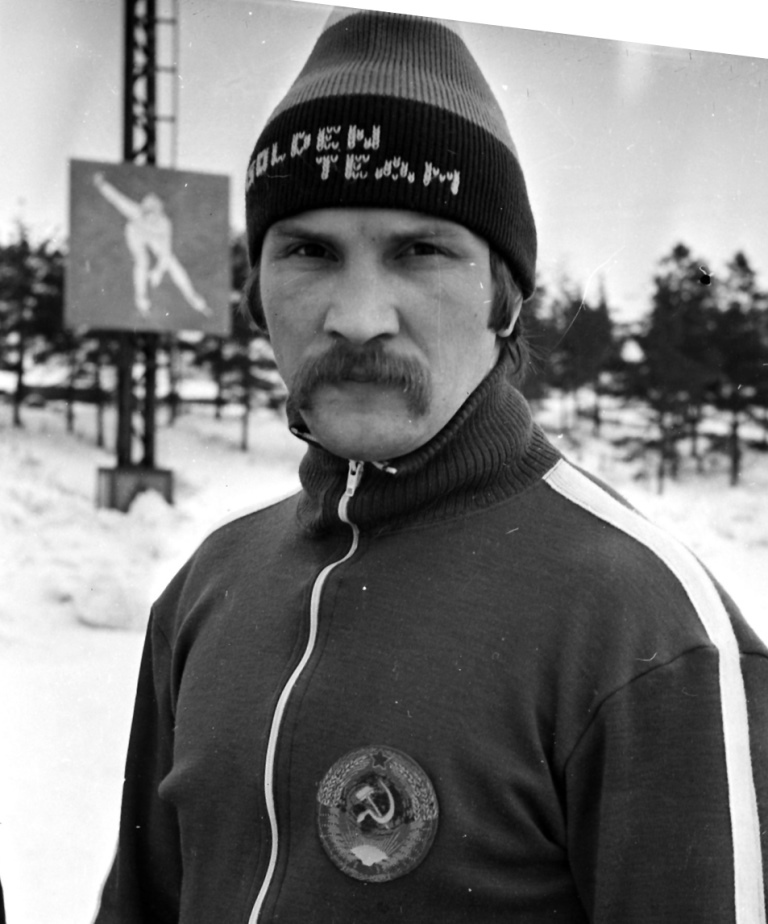
Sergey Khlebnikov

- August 1 – Tunde Adegbola, Nigerian scientist, musician, engineer, linguist and culture activist
- August 2
  - John Battaglia, American convicted murderer (d. 2018)
  - Caleb Carr, American writer
- August 4
  - Gerrie Coetzee, South African boxer, 1983–1984 WBA heavyweight champion.
  - Billy Bob Thornton, American actor, director and screenwriter
  - Alberto Gonzales, American lawyer and 80th United States Attorney General
  - Andrew M. Allen, American astronaut
- August 6
  - Gordon J. Brand, English golfer (d. 2020)
  - Earl "Chinna" Smith, Jamaican Reggae guitarist
  - Terry Finn, American actress
- August 7
  - Wayne Knight, American actor and comedian
  - Vladimir Sorokin, Russian writer
- August 8 – Diddú, Icelandic soprano and songwriter
- August 9
  - Doug Williams, American football quarterback
  - Sukhdev Singh Babbar, militant and co-leader of Babbar Khalsa (BK)
  - Udo Beyer, East German track and field athlete
- August 10
  - Mel Tiangco, Filipina television anchor, journalist and humanitarian
  - Eddie Campbell, British comics artist and cartoonist
- August 11 – Ted Robbins, English comic, actor, television presenter and radio broadcaster
  - Hilary Beckles, Barbadian historian
- August 12 – Heintje Simons, Dutch singer and actor
- August 13 – Daryl, American magician (d. 2017)
- August 17 – Richard Hilton, American businessman
- August 19
  - Peter Gallagher, American actor
  - Apisai Ielemia, 10th Prime Minister of Tuvalu (d. 2018)
- August 20
  - Agnes Chan, Hong Kong-born TV personality in Japan
  - Luis Alberto Urrea, Mexican-American poet, novelist and essayist
  - Jay Acovone, American actor
  - Gloria Brame, American sexologist, writer and sex therapist
- August 22
  - Chiranjeevi, Indian actor
  - Gordon Liu, Chinese actor
- August 23 – Reuven Amitai, Israeli-American historian and writer
- August 24 – Mike Huckabee, American politician, Governor and 2008 presidential candidate
- August 25 – John McGeoch, Scottish rock guitarist (d. 2004)
- August 27
  - Laura Fygi, Dutch singer
  - Diana Scarwid, American actress
  - Sergey Khlebnikov, Soviet speed skater (d. 1999)
- August 29
  - Jack Lew, 76th US Treasury Secretary
- August 30
  - Mayumi Muroyama, Japanese manga artist
  - Andy Pask, English bass player and composer (Landscape)
  - Helge Schneider, comedian, jazz musician and multi-instrumentalist, author, film and theatre director
  - Jaime Aparicio Otero, Bolivian diplomat, lawyer and journalist
  - Anthony Coleman, American avant-garde jazz pianist
- August 31 – Edwin Moses, American athlete

=== September ===
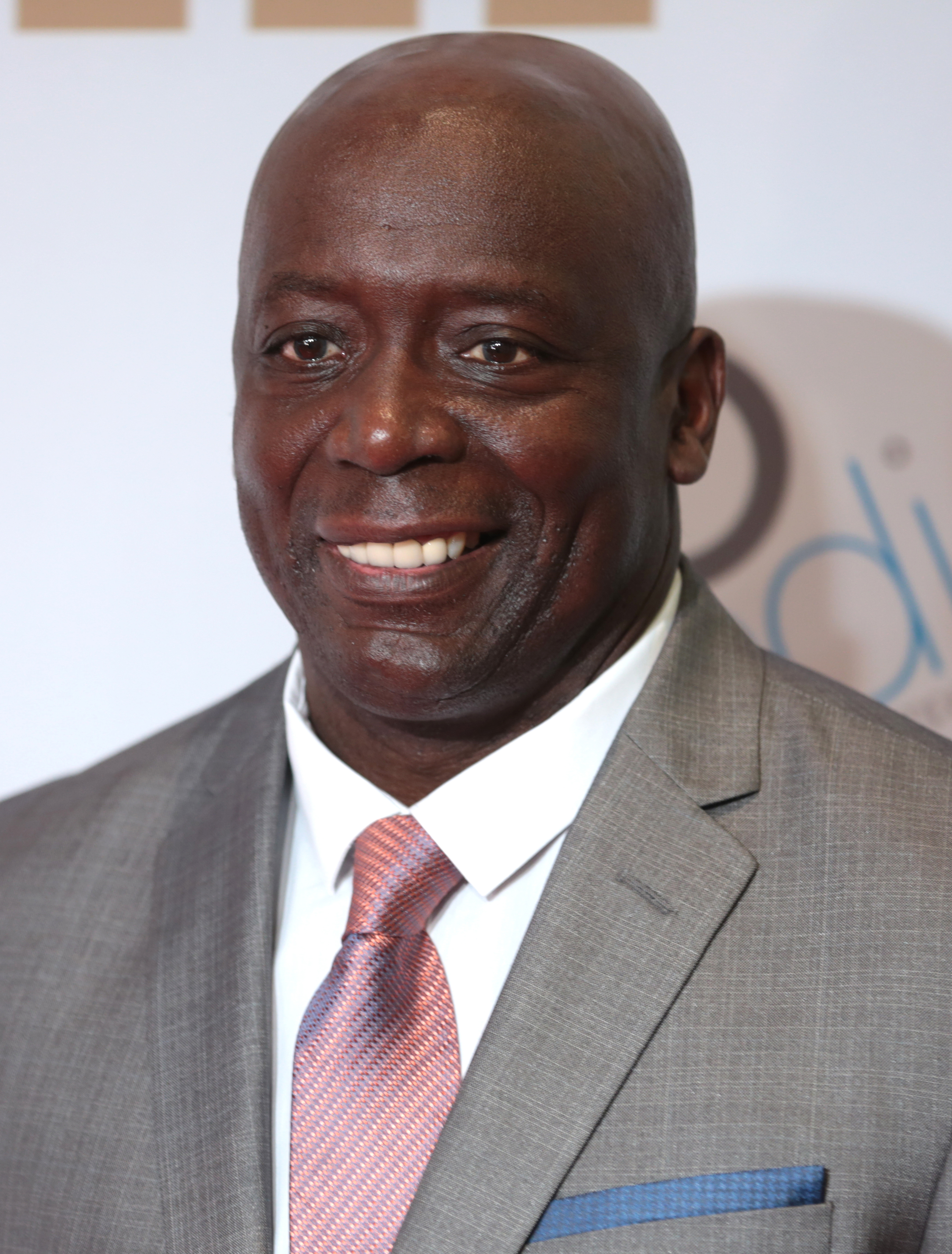
Billy Blanks

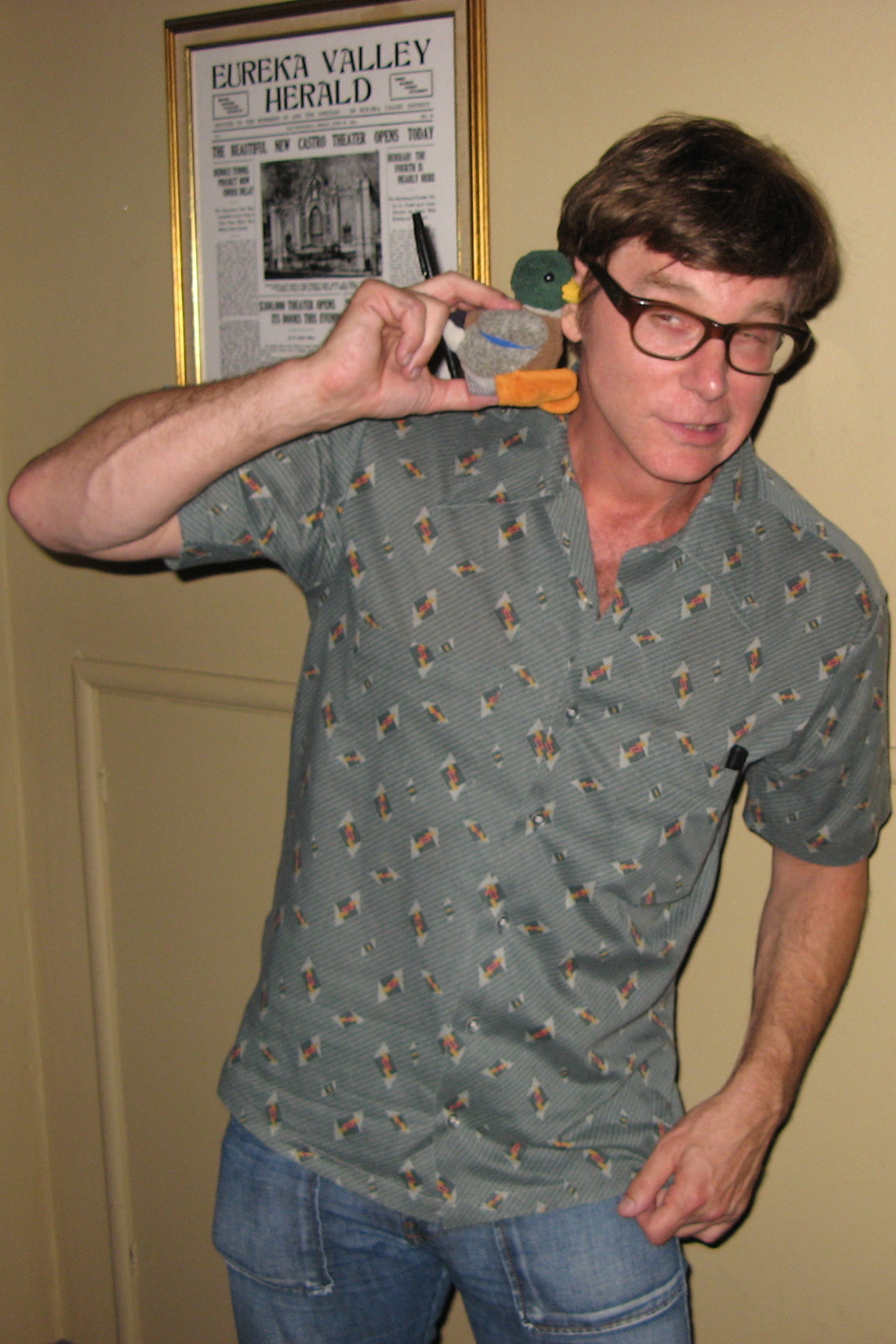
John Kricfalusi

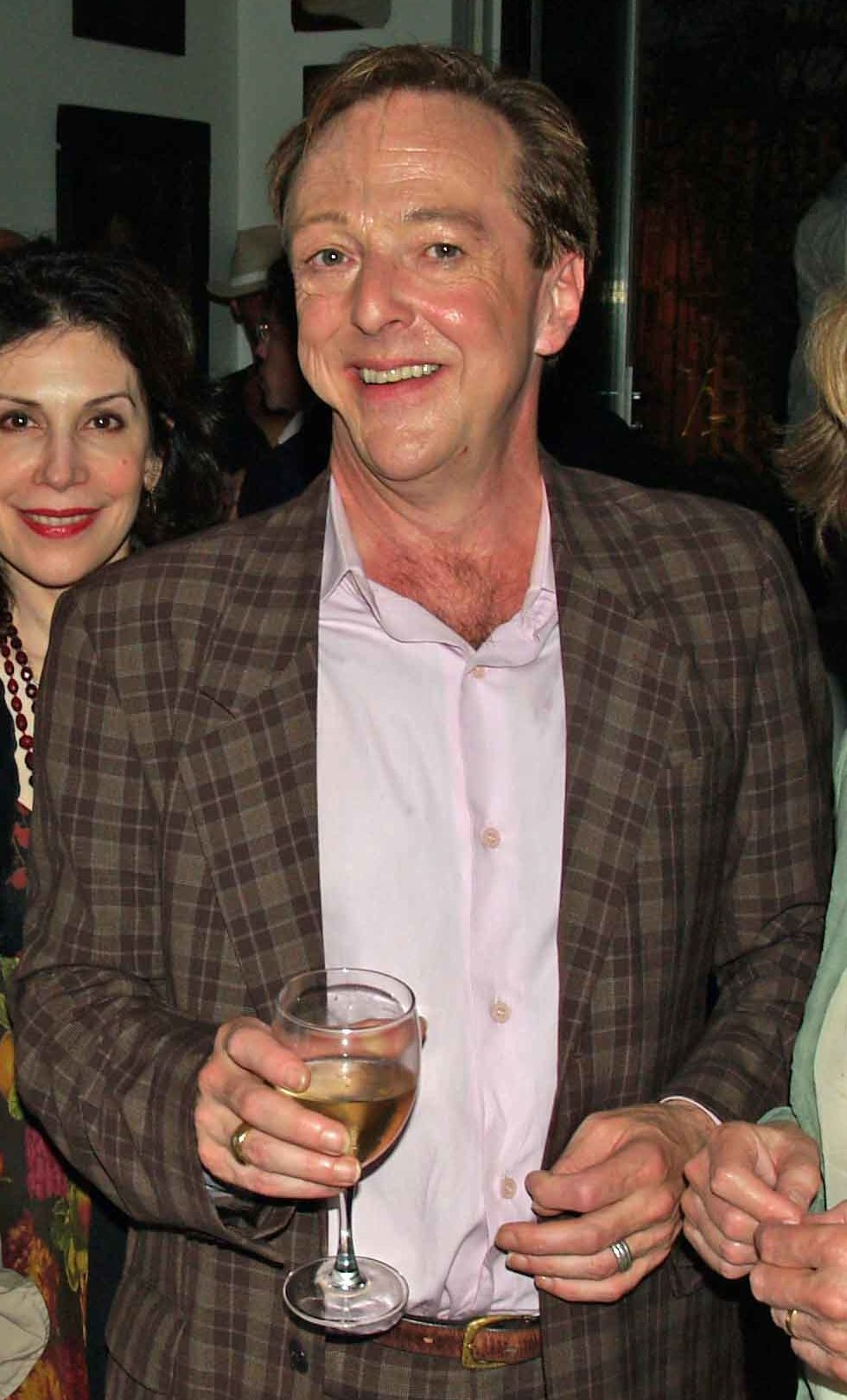
Edward Hibbert

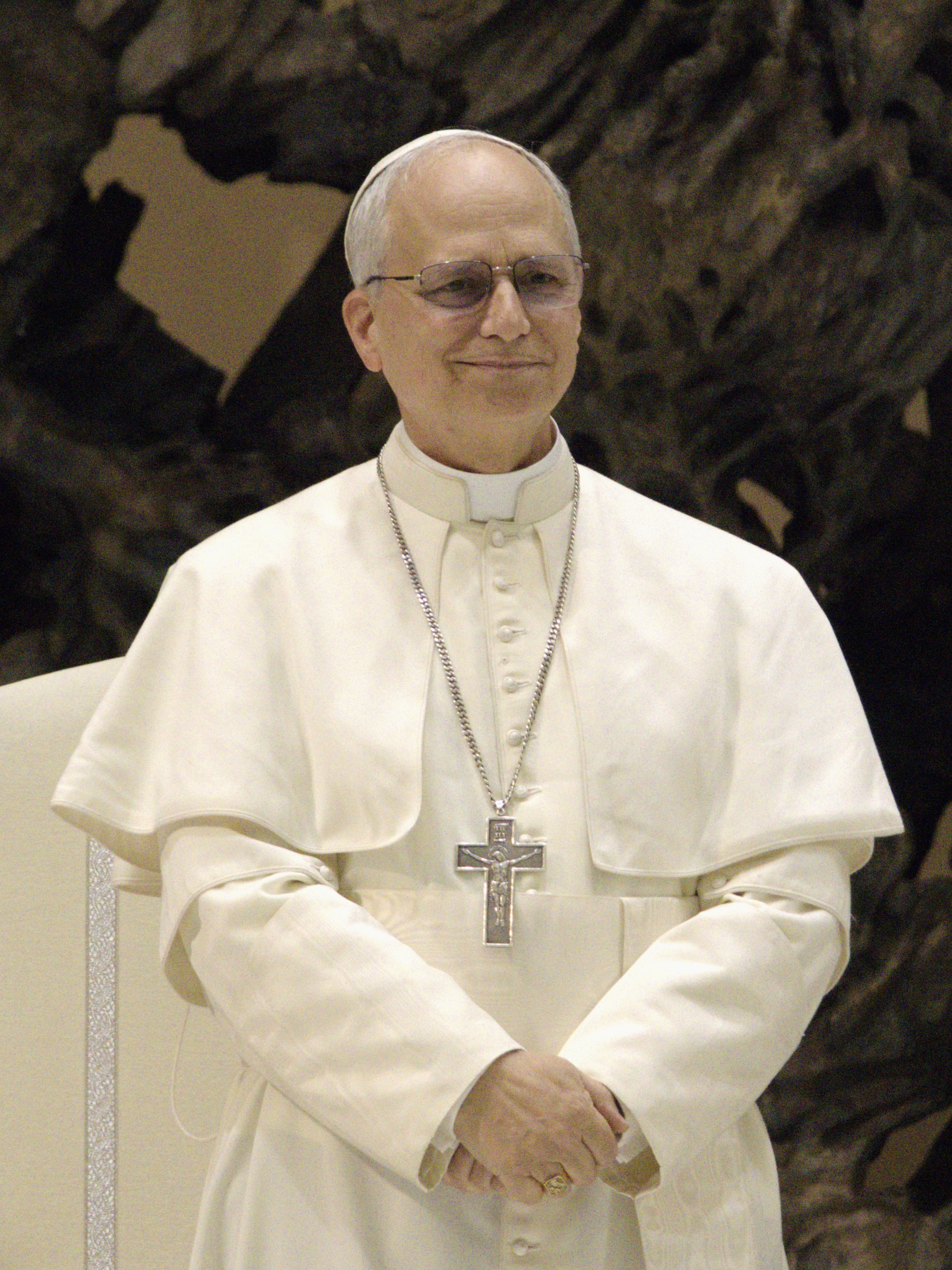
Pope Leo XIV

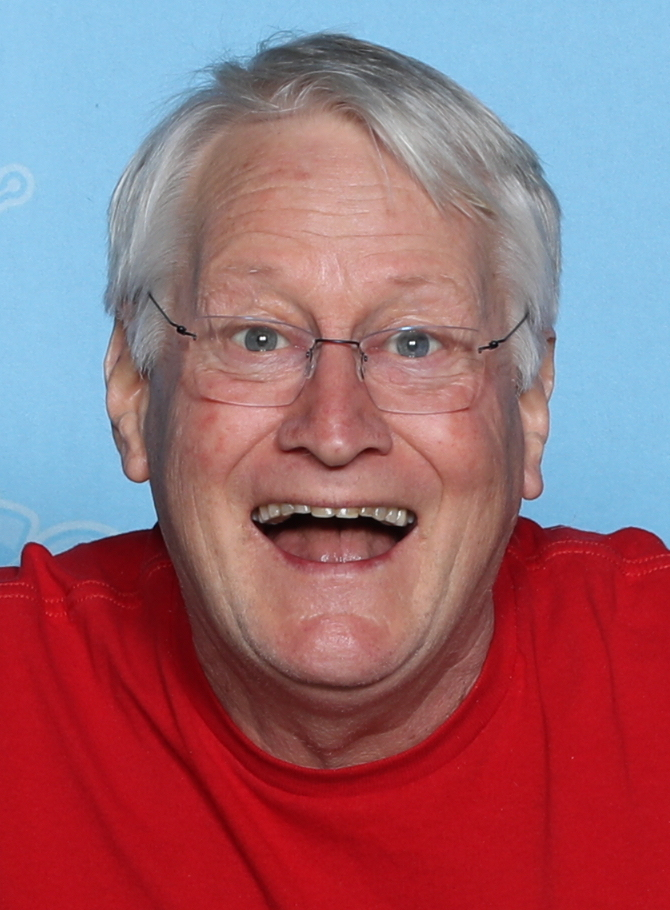
Charles Martinet

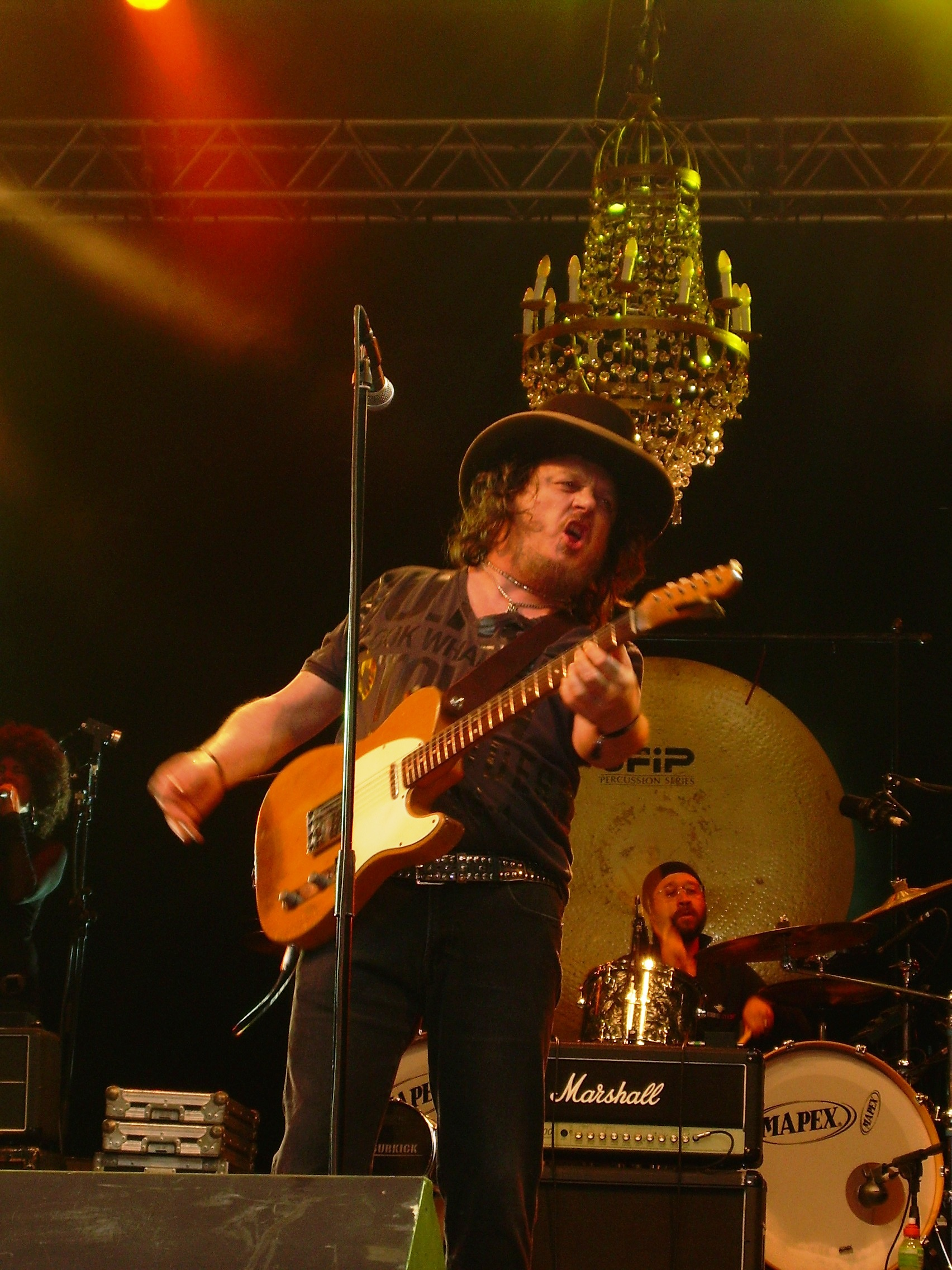
Zucchero Fornaciari

- September 1
  - Billy Blanks, American martial artist; inventor of the Tae Bo exercise program
  - Bruce Foxton, English musician
- September 2
  - Robert Duncan, American astrophysicist
  - Claus Kleber, German television journalist
  - Natalya Petrusyova, Soviet speed skater
  - Michelle Yim, Hong Kong actress
  - Linda Purl, American actress
- September 4
  - David Broza, Israeli singer-songwriter and activist
  - Teodor Frunzeti, Romanian general
  - Hiroshi Izawa, Japanese actor
- September 6
  - Raymond Benson, American author
  - Kwaku Agyemang-Manu, Ghanaian politician
  - Paul Cliteur, Dutch professor of jurisprudence, politician, philosopher, writer, publicist and columnist
- September 7 – Efim Zelmanov, Russian mathematician
- September 8 – Thad Altman, American politician
- September 9
  - Edward Hibbert, English-American actor and literary agent
  - John Kricfalusi, Canadian cartoonist
  - Ivan Smirnov, Russian composer and guitar player (d. 2018)
- September 11
  - Hiram Bullock, American jazz guitarist (d. 2008)
  - David Clendon, New Zealand politician
- September 12 – Peter Scolari, American actor and comedian (d. 2021)
- September 13 – Dan Ghica-Radu, Romanian general
- September 14
  - Geraldine Brooks, Australian-American journalist and novelist
  - Daniella Levine Cava, American lawyer and politician
  - Pope Leo XIV, head of the Catholic Church
- September 15
  - Željka Antunović, Croatian politician
  - Bruce Reitherman, American filmmaker and voice actor
  - Renzo Rosso, Italian clothing designer
  - Abdul Qadir, Pakistani cricketeer (d. 2019)
  - Iftach Alony, Israeli writer, poet and architect
- September 16
  - Robin Yount, American baseball player
  - Jayati Ghosh, Indian development economist and professor
  - Đorđe Božović, Serbian criminal and paramilitary commander in the Yugoslav Wars (d. 1991)
- September 17
  - Marina Lima, Brazilian singer and songwriter
  - Charles Martinet, American voice actor
  - Brendan O'Carroll, Irish actor and comedian
- September 18 – Paul Butler, British Anglican bishop and Lord Spiritual of the House of Lords
- September 19
  - Richard Burmer, American composer, sound designer and musician (d. 2006)
  - Henry Cuellar, American attorney and politician
  - Rebecca Blank, American economist and academic administrator (d. 2023)
  - Alain Manceau, French environmental mineralogist and biogeochemist
- September 20 – Georg Christoph Biller, German choral conductor (d. 2022)
- September 21
  - Candy Atherton, British politician (d. 2017)
  - Philip M. Breedlove, US Airforce general
  - François Cluzet, French film and theatre actor
  - Israel Katz, Israeli politician
- September 22
  - John R. Adams, American judge and a United States district judge
  - John Brennan, American Director of the Central Intelligence Agency (CIA)
- September 24 – Lane Brody, American country music singer-songwriter
- September 25
  - Zucchero Fornaciari, Italian singer-songwriter
  - Karl-Heinz Rummenigge, German football player
  - Roni Horn, American visual artist and writer
- September 27
  - Thelma Aldana, Guatemalan jurist and politician
  - Charles Burns, American cartoonist and illustrator
- September 28 – Stéphane Dion, Canadian politician
- September 29
  - Joe Donnelly, American politician
  - Gwen Ifill, American journalist (d. 2016)
- September 30
  - Janet Arceo, Mexican actress, TV presenter, announcer, director and businesswoman (Doña Eduviges in El Chavo del Ocho)
  - Andy Bechtolsheim, German electrical engineer and co-founder of Sun Microsystems.

=== October ===
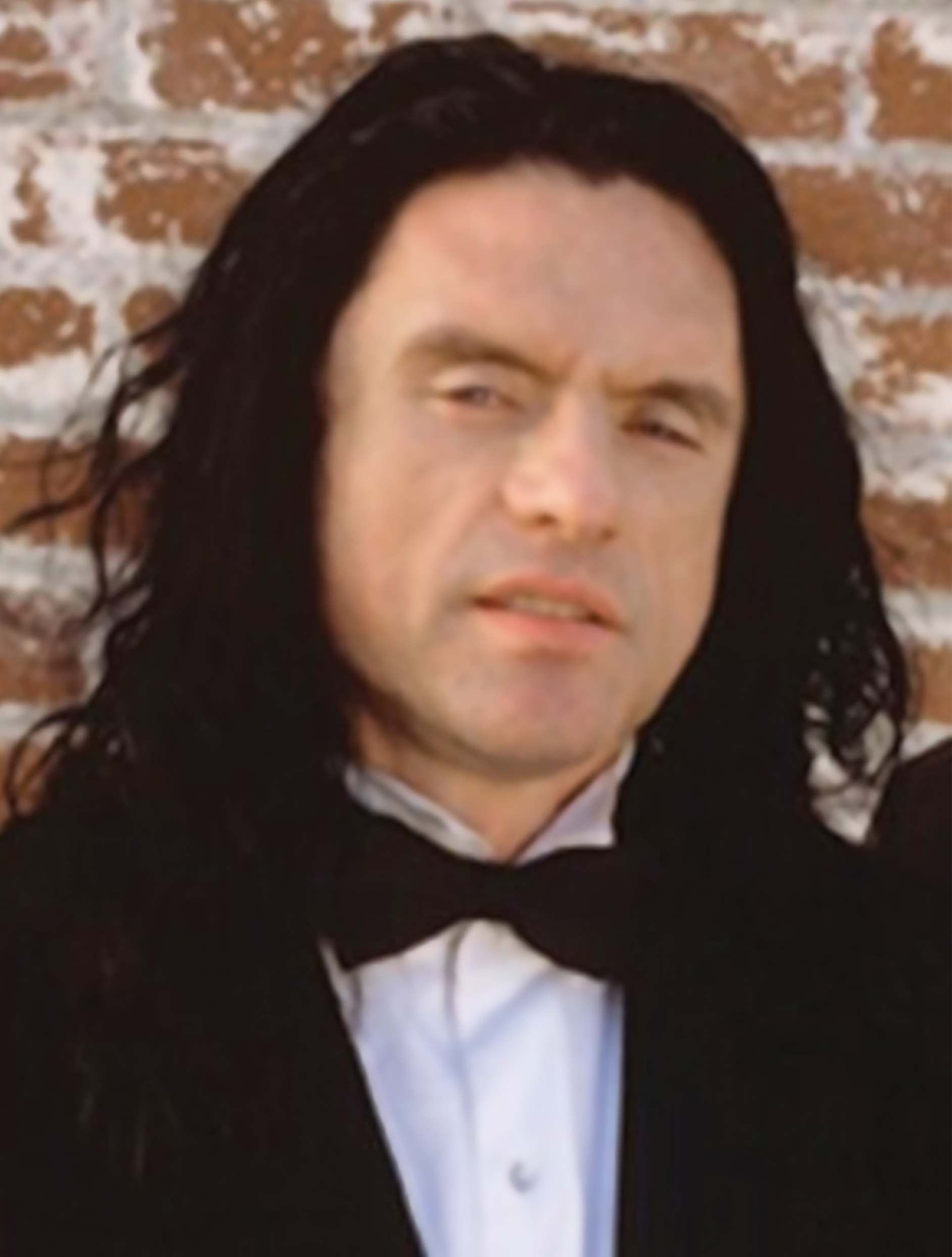
Tommy Wiseau

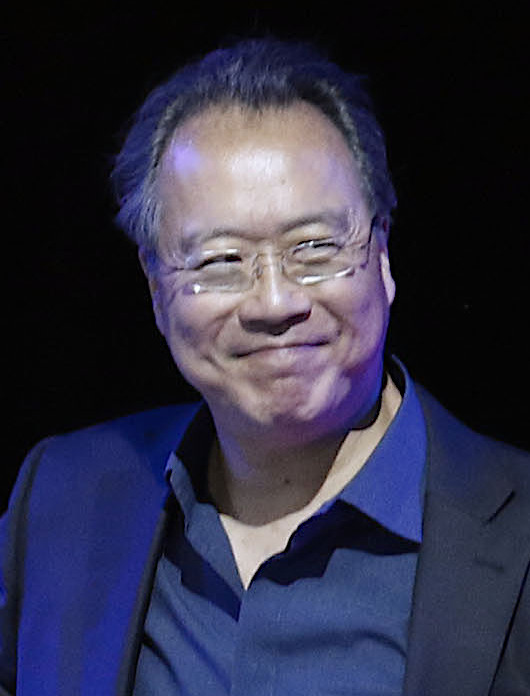
Yo-Yo Ma

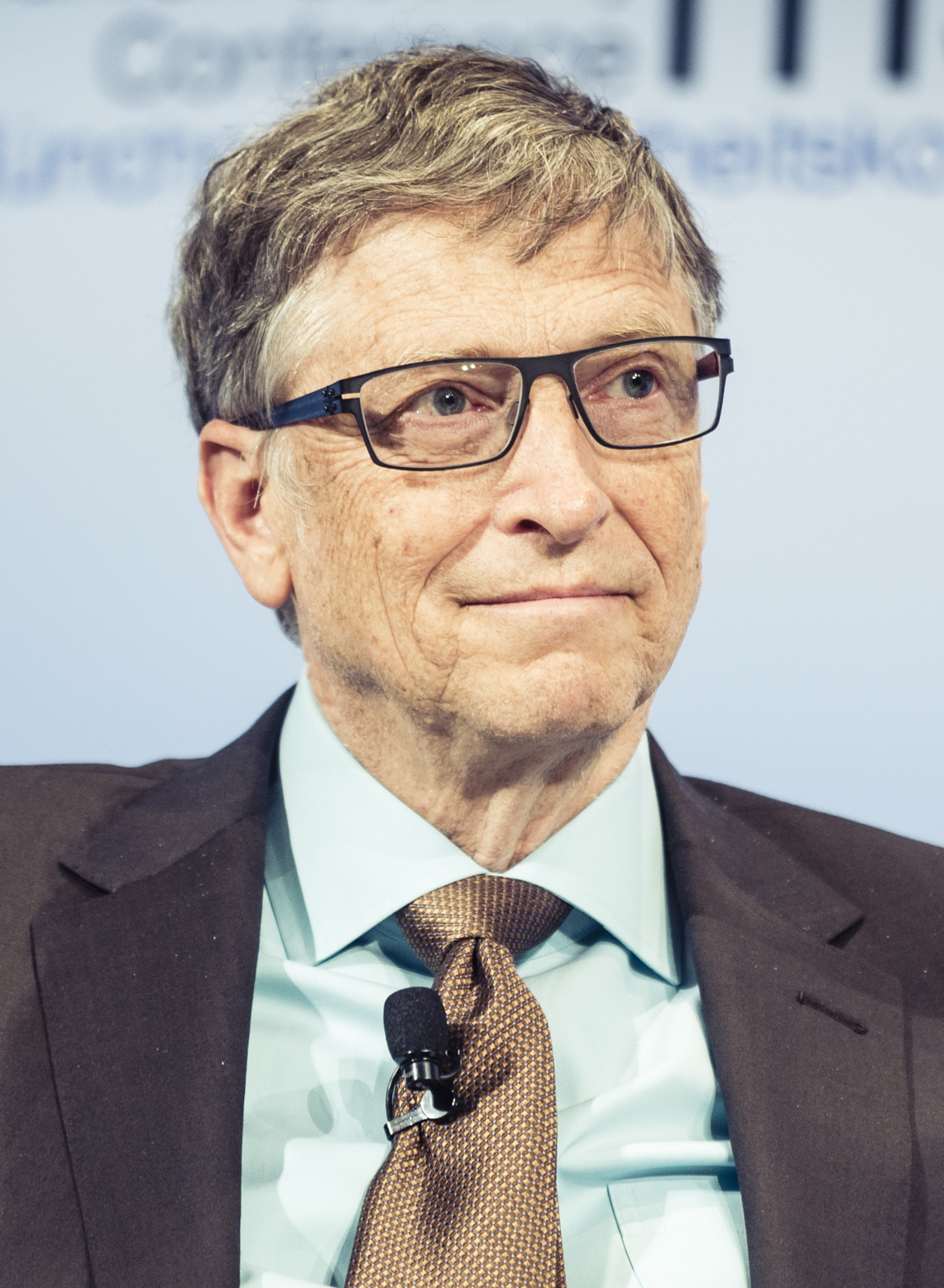
Bill Gates

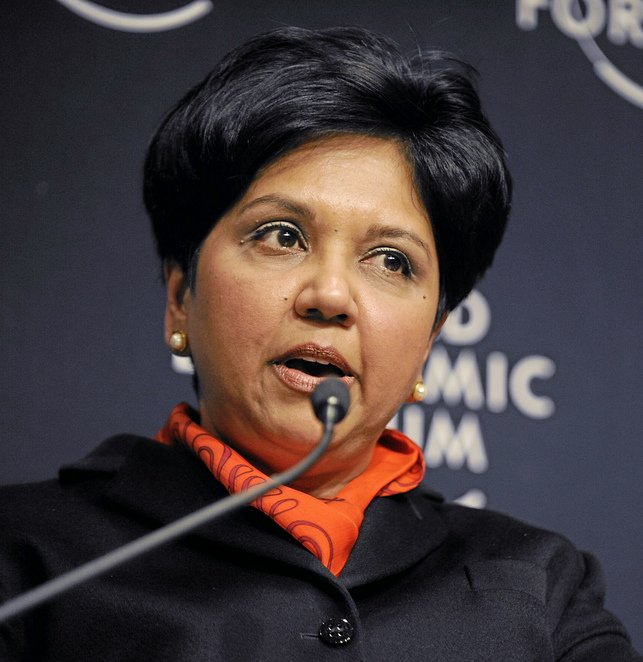
Indra Nooyi

- October 1
  - Howard Hewett, American singer-songwriter
  - P. B. Abdul Razak, Indian politician (d. 2018)
- October 2
  - Philip Oakey, English synth-pop singer-songwriter (The Human League)
  - Bruce Blakeman, American politician and attorney
- October 3
  - Tommy Wiseau, American film director and actor (The Room)
  - Salah Bachir, Canadian business executive, entrepreneur, publisher, art collector, fundraiser and philanthropist
- October 4 – Dane Sorensen, New Zealand rugby league player
- October 5
  - Bart D. Ehrman, American religious scholar and writer, specialist in textual criticism
  - Jean-Jacques Lafon, French singer-songwriter
  - Caroline Loeb, French singer and actress
  - Adair Turner, British businessman and academic
- October 6
  - Tony Dungy, American football coach
  - Velma Scantlebury, Barbadian-born American surgeon
  - Wang Huning, Chinese politician
- October 7
  - Claudio Gugerotti, Italian Catholic clergyman
  - Yo-Yo Ma, French-born Chinese American cellist
  - Toshimitsu Motegi, Japanese politician
- October 8
  - Al Borges, American football coach
  - Bill Elliott, American racing driver
  - Darrell Hammond, American comedian (Saturday Night Live)
- October 11
  - Hans-Peter Briegel, German footballer and manager
  - Norm Nixon, American basketball player
  - Haitham bin Tariq, Sultan and Prime Minister of Oman
- October 12
  - Ante Gotovina, Croatian military officer
  - Pat DiNizio, American rock singer-songwriter (The Smithereens) (d. 2017)
- October 13
  - Guy Cogeval, French art historian (d. 2025)
  - Sergei Shepelev, Russian ice hockey player
- October 14
  - Matthias Herrmann, German musicologist
  - Thomas Keller, American chef
  - Arleen Sorkin, American actress, screenwriter, television presenter and comedian (d. 2023)
  - Richard Wagamese, Canadian Ojibwe writer (d. 2017)
- October 15
  - James Aguayo-Martel, Mexican-born physician, surgeon, scientist and inventor
  - Kulbir Bhaura, Indian-born British field hockey player
  - Joaquín Caparrós, Spanish football manager
- October 17
  - Georgios Alogoskoufis, Greek economist
  - Smita Patil, Indian actress (d. 1986)
- October 18 – Hiromi Go, Japanese singer
- October 19
  - Lonnie Shelton, American basketball player (d. 2018)
  - Roland Dyens, French classical guitarist and composer (d. 2016)
  - Dan Gutman, American writer
- October 20 – Thomas Newman, American composer
- October 21
  - Rich Mullins, American Christian musician (d. 1997)
  - Catherine Hardwicke, American film director, production designer and screenwriter
- October 23 – Toshio Hosokawa, Japanese composer
- October 28
  - Bill Gates, American businessman and co-founder of Microsoft
  - Indra Nooyi, Indian business executive
- October 29
  - Kevin DuBrow, American rock singer (d. 2007)
  - Roger O'Donnell, English rock keyboardist
  - Etsuko Shihomi, Japanese actress
- October 30 – Heidi Heitkamp, American politician, senator, attorney general and tax commissioner from North Dakota
- October 31
  - John Barrow, American politician
  - Daryl Coley, American Christian singer (d. 2016)

=== November ===
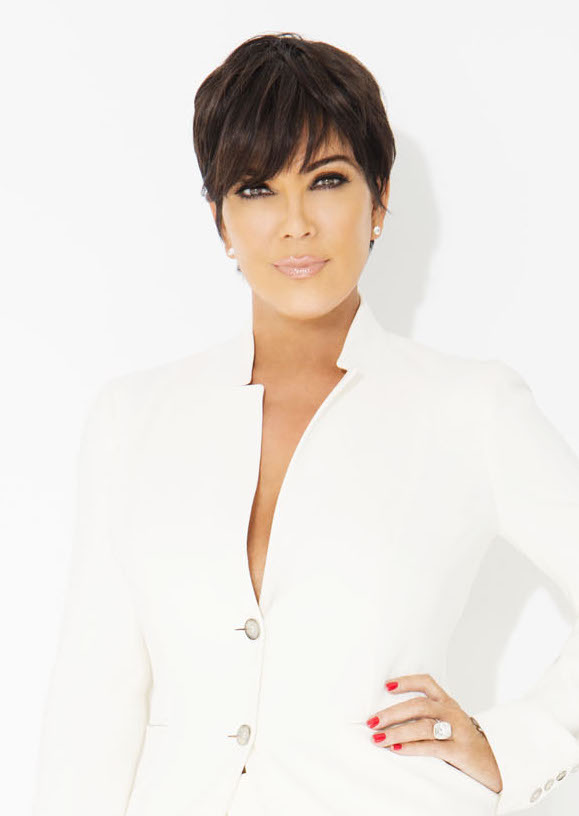
Kris Jenner

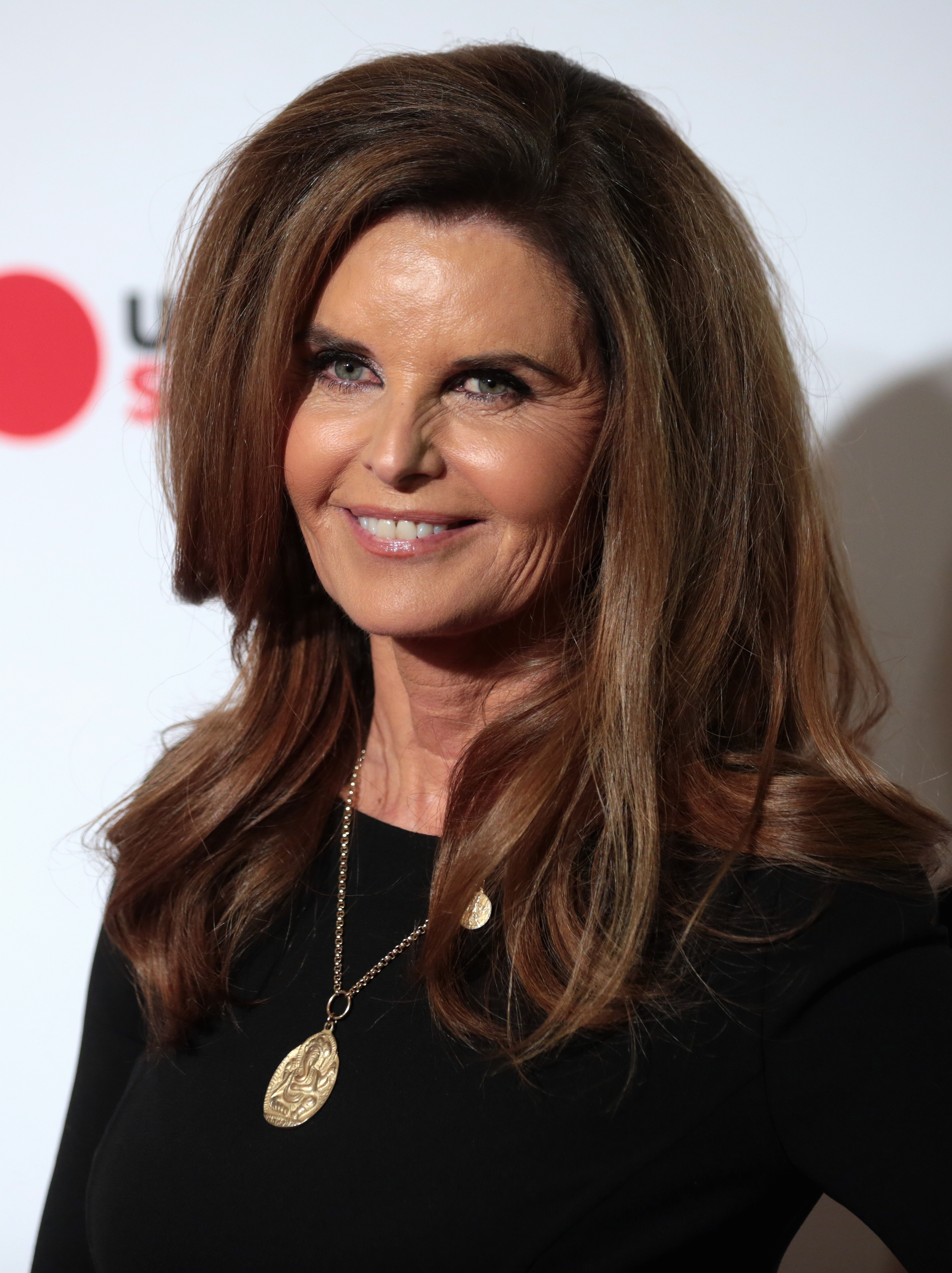
Maria Shriver

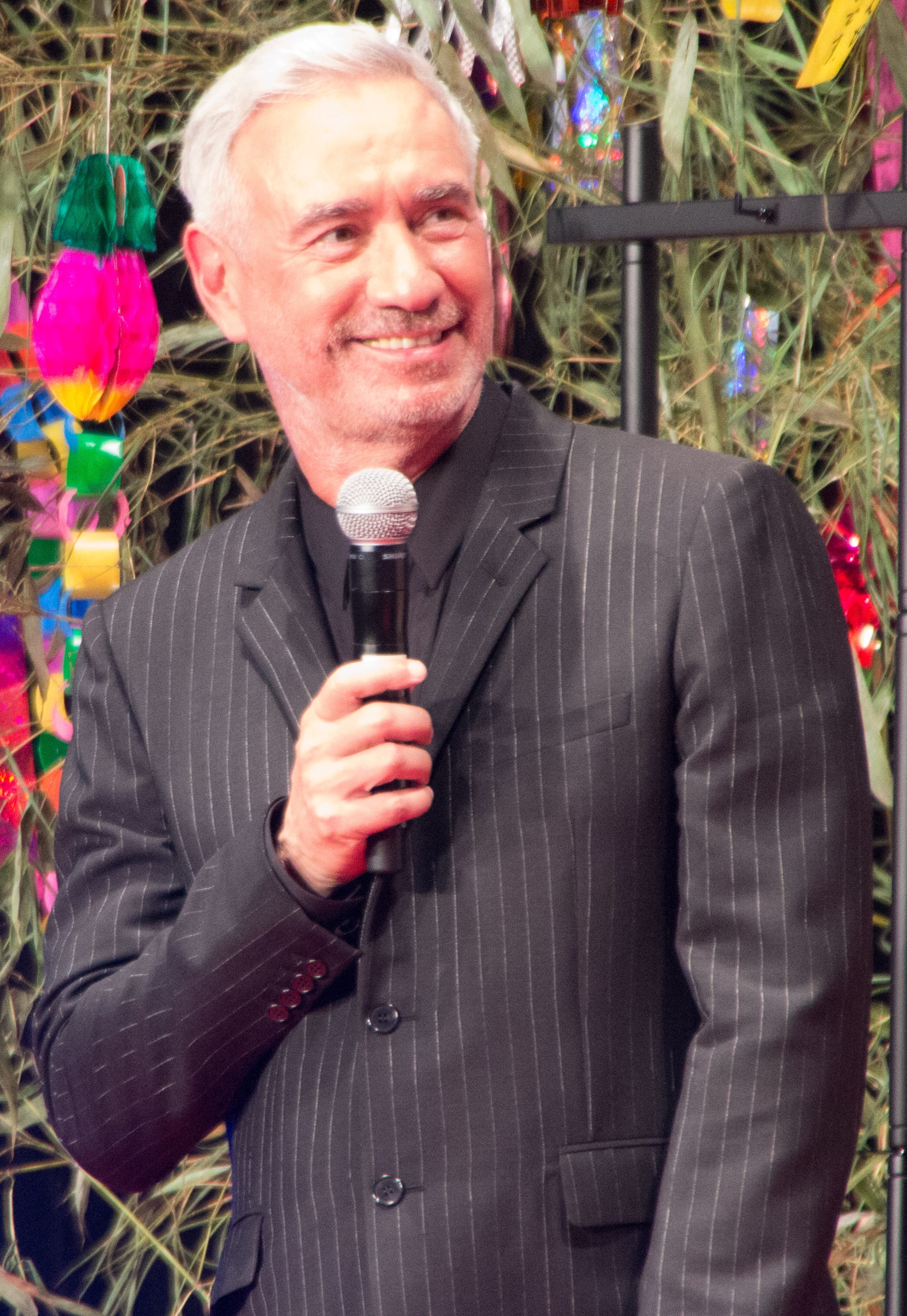
Roland Emmerich

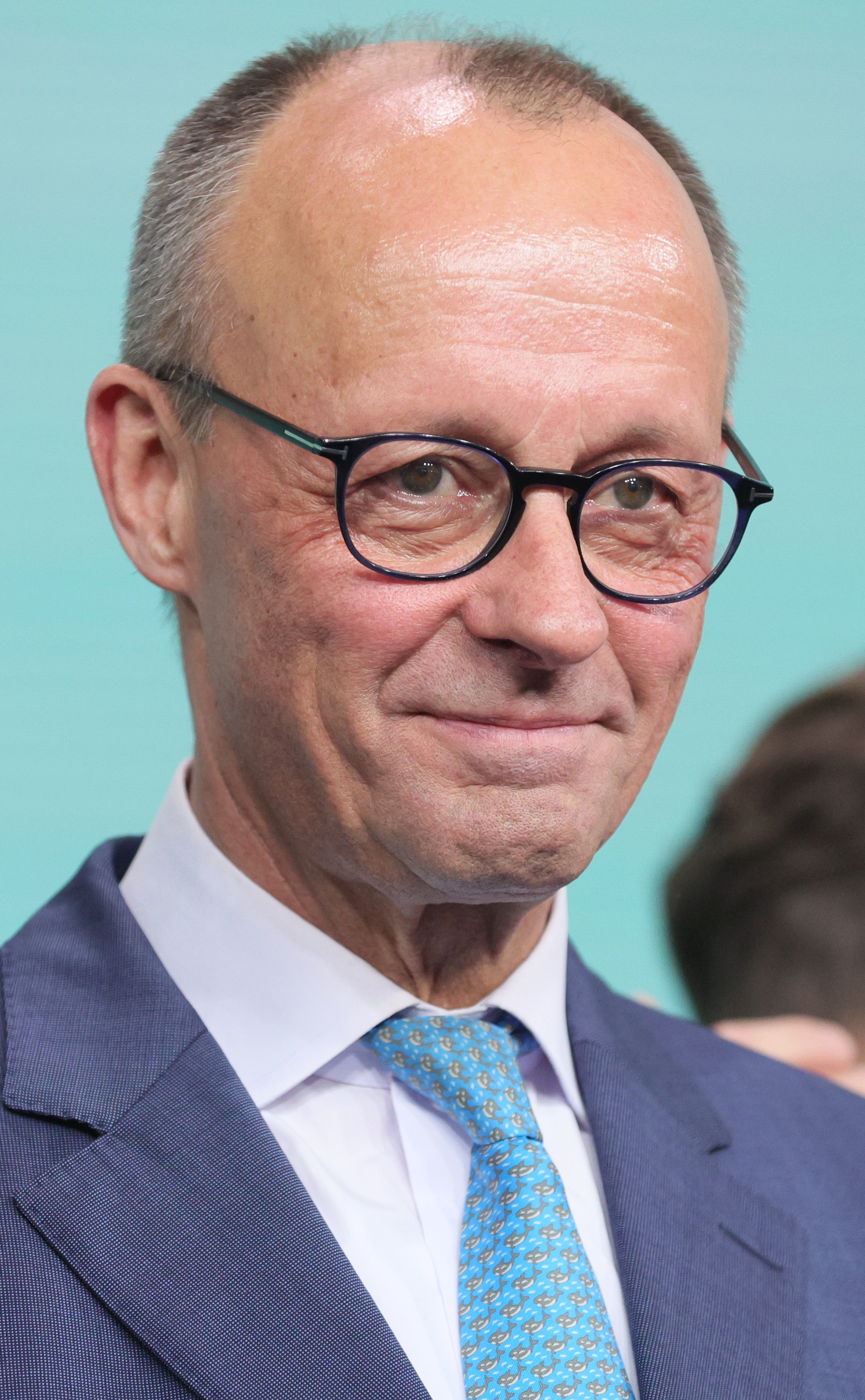
Friedrich Merz

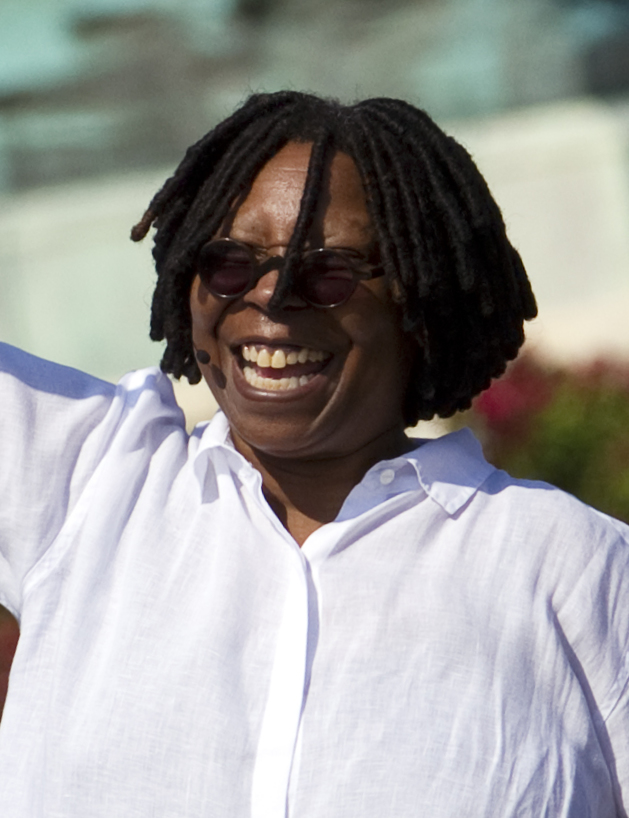
Whoopi Goldberg

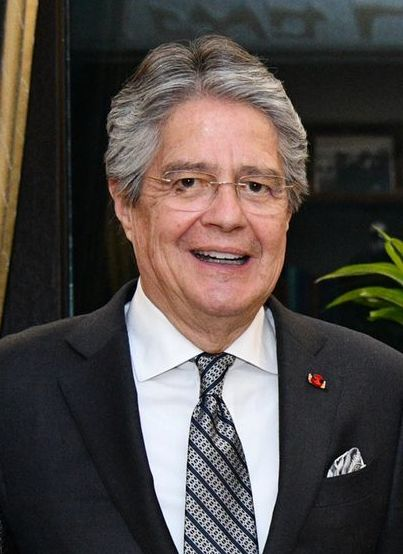
Guillermo Lasso

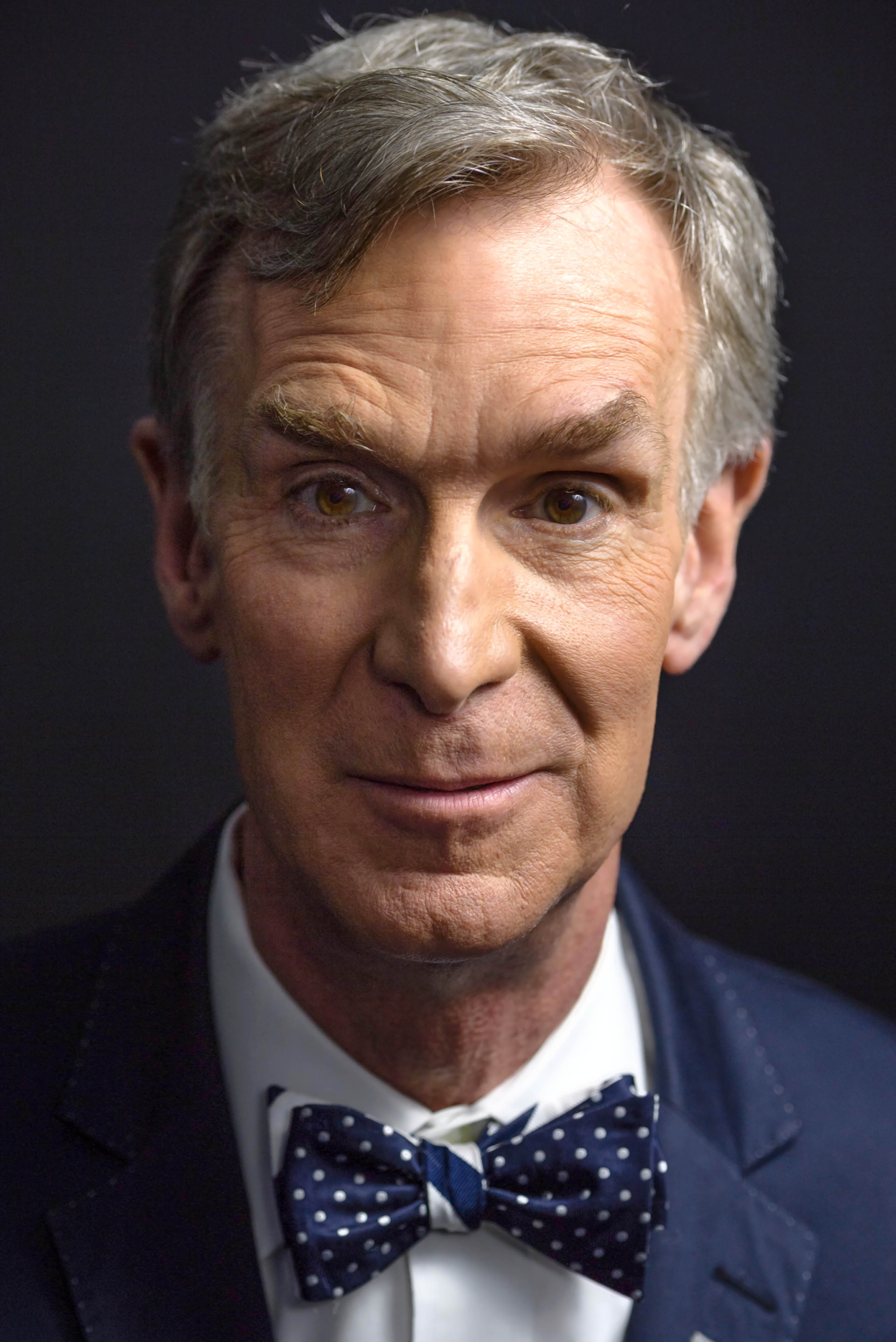
Bill Nye

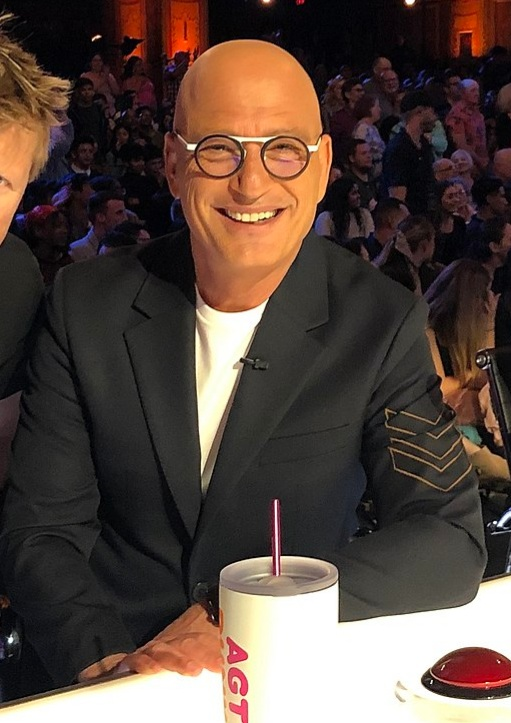
Howie Mandel

- November 1 – Joe Arroyo, Colombian salsa and tropical music singer (d. 2011)
- November 2 – Peter Bossman, Ghanaian-born Slovenian physician and politician
- November 3
  - Howard Michaels, American businessman (d. 2018)
  - Teresa De Sio, Italian singer-songwriter
  - Phil Simms, American football player
  - Yukihiko Tsutsumi, Japanese film director
- November 4
  - Rita Bhaduri, Indian actress (d. 2018)
  - Ghousavi Shah, Sufi teacher and author, Secretary General of The Conference of World Religions
  - Matti Vanhanen, Prime Minister of Finland
- November 5
  - Pedro Brieger, Argentine journalist and sociologist.
  - Kris Jenner, American television personality
  - Karan Thapar, Indian journalist, political analyst and commentator
- November 6
  - Catherine Asaro, American science fiction and fantasy author, singer and teacher
  - Geoff Bullock, Australian singer-songwriter and pianist
  - Alton Coleman, American serial killer (executed 2002)
  - William H. McRaven, U.S. Navy admiral and SEAL, leader of planning for Operation Neptune Spear
  - Paul Romer, American economist, professor and policy entrepreneur
- November 7
  - Norbert Eder, German footballer (d. 2019)
  - Paul Romer, American economist, Nobel Memorial Prize in Economic Sciences laureate
  - Detlef Ultsch, German judo athlete
- November 8 – Aras Agalarov, Azerbaijani Russian billionaire
- November 9
  - Karen Dotrice, Guernsey-born child actress
  - Kevin Andrews, Australian politician (d. 2024)
- November 10
  - Roland Emmerich, German film director
  - Jacques Burtin, French composer, writer, producer and filmmaker
- November 11
  - Friedrich Merz, German politician, Chancellor of Germany
  - Jigme Singye Wangchuck, King of Bhutan
  - Dave Alvin, American singer-songwriter, guitarist and producer
- November 12 – Lawrence Lemieux, Canadian sailor and Olympian
- November 13 – Whoopi Goldberg, American actress and comedian
- November 14
  - Koichi Nakano, Japanese bicycle racer
  - Jack Sikma, American basketball player
- November 15 – Idris Jusoh, Malaysian politician, Chief Minister Of Terengganu
- November 16 – Guillermo Lasso, President of Ecuador
- November 17
  - Yolanda King, African-American actress and activist (d. 2007)
  - Patrick Achi, Ivorian politician and former Prime Minister of Côte d'Ivoire
  - Steve Chalke, British Baptist minister, founder of Oasis Charitable Trust, UN Special Adviser on Human Trafficking and social activist
- November 19 – Dianne de Leeuw, Dutch figure skater
- November 20 – Ray Ozzie, American computer programmer
- November 21 – Cedric Maxwell, American basketball player
- November 22
  - George Alagiah, British newsreader, journalist and television presenter (d. 2023)
  - Milan Bandić, Croatian politician (d. 2021)
- November 23
  - Ludovico Einaudi, Italian pianist and composer
  - Mary Landrieu, American politician, U.S. Senator from Louisiana
  - Harolyn Blackwell, American lyric coloratura soprano
- November 24
  - Sir Ian Botham, English cricketer
  - Najib Mikati, Lebanese politician, 2-Time Prime Minister of Lebanon
- November 25 – Bruno Tonioli, film, music video and theater choreographer
- November 26
  - Tracy Hickman, American author
  - Jelko Kacin, Slovenian politician, Member of the European Parliament
- November 27 – Bill Nye, American science presenter and public television host
- November 28
  - Alessandro Altobelli, Italian football player
  - Wendy Brown, American political theorist
- November 29 – Howie Mandel, Canadian actor and game show host
- November 30
  - Billy Idol, born William Broad, British rock musician
  - Kevin Conroy, American actor (d. 2022)
  - Andy Gray, Scottish football broadcaster and player
  - Deborra-Lee Furness, Australian actress and producer
  - Richard Burr, American businessman and politician

=== December ===
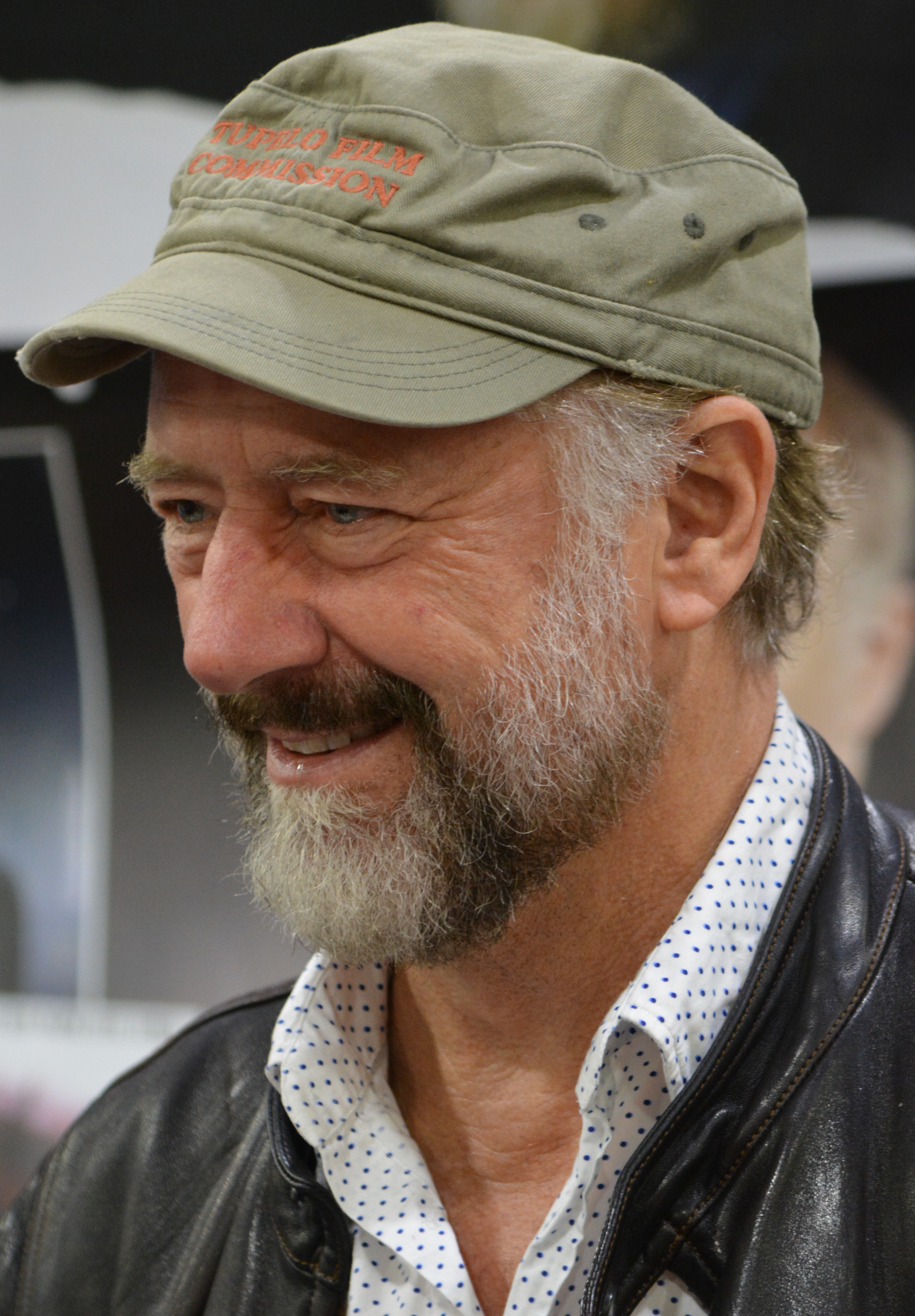
Xander Berkeley

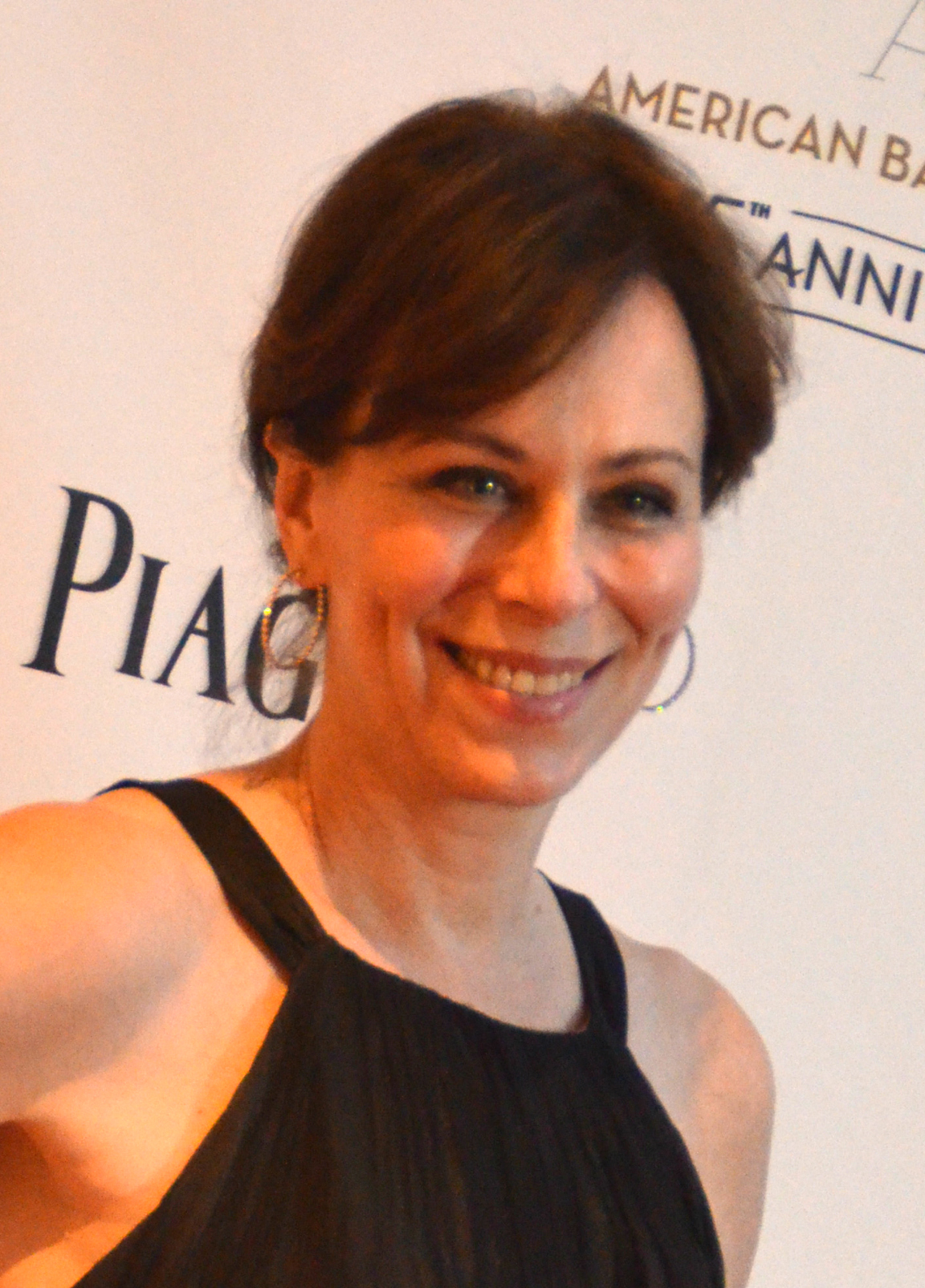
Jane Kaczmarek

- December 3
  - Melody Anderson, Canadian actress and social worker
  - Steven Culp, American actor
  - Warren Jeffs, American criminal
  - Andrea Romano, American casting director, voice director and voice actress
  - Tommy Battle, American businessman and politician
  - Art Briles, American football coach
  - Pier Ferdinando Casini, Italian politician
- December 4 – Maurizio Bianchi, Italian musician
- December 5
  - Koray Aydın, Turkish politician
  - Cai Qi, Chinese politician
  - Dumitru Găleșanu, Romanian writer, poet, philosopher, illustrator and jurist
- December 6
  - Steven Wright, American stand-up comedian, actor, writer and film producer
  - Anne Begg, Scottish politician
- December 9
  - Otis Birdsong, American basketball player
  - Janusz Kupcewicz, Polish footballer (d. 2022)
- December 10 – Ana Gabriel, Mexican singer and songwriter
- December 12 – Gianna Angelopoulos-Daskalaki, Greek politician and businesswoman
- December 13 – Manohar Parrikar, Indian politician (d. 2019)
- December 14
  - Hervé Guibert, French writer and photographer (d. 1991)
  - Rebeca Grynspan, Costa Rican economist
- December 16
  - Xander Berkeley, American actor
  - Carol Browner, American lawyer, environmentalist, government official and businesswoman
- December 17
  - Jagadish Shettar, Indian politician
  - Danny Ayalon, Israeli diplomat, columnist and politician
- December 19 – Alfredo Castro, Chilean actor
- December 21 – Jane Kaczmarek, American actress
- December 23 – Carol Ann Duffy, Scottish poet
- December 24
  - Mizuho Fukushima, Japanese politician
  - Clarence Gilyard, American actor and college professor (d. 2022)
- December 25 – Jim Beloff, American musician
- December 26 – Evan Bayh, American politician
- December 28 – Liu Xiaobo, Chinese literary critic and human rights activist, Nobel Peace Prize laureate (d. 2017)
- December 29 – Claudi Arimany, Catalan musician
- December 31 – Jim Pillen, American politician and Governor of Nebraska since 2023

=== Date Unknown ===
- Justine Véronique Abatchou, Central African politician, Member of National Assembly.
- Kamal Abbas, Egyptian activist and trade unionist
- Mostafa Abdollahi, Iranian actor and director (d. 2015)
- Richard Abel, Canadian instrumental musician and pianist

== Deaths ==
=== January ===
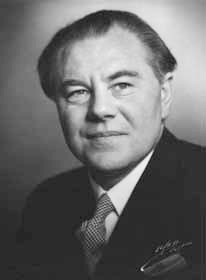
Hans Hedtoft

- January 1
  - Shanti Swaroop Bhatnagar, Indian scientist (b. 1894)
  - Maria Bal, Polish baroness and a lifelong muse of Jacek Malczewski (b. 1879)
- January 2 – José Antonio Remón Cantera, 19th President of Panama (assassinated) (b. 1908)
- January 5 – Marcel Déat, French politician (b. 1894)
- January 6 – Yevgeny Tarle, Soviet historian (b. 1874)
- January 11 – Rodolfo Graziani, Italian general (b. 1882)
- January 15
  - Johannes Baader, German artist (b. 1875)
  - Yves Tanguy, French painter (b. 1900)
- January 21 – Archie Hahn, American athlete (b. 1880)
- January 29 – Hans Hedtoft, 14th Prime Minister of Denmark (b. 1903)
- January 31 – John Mott, American YMCA leader, recipient of the Nobel Peace Prize (b. 1865)

=== February ===
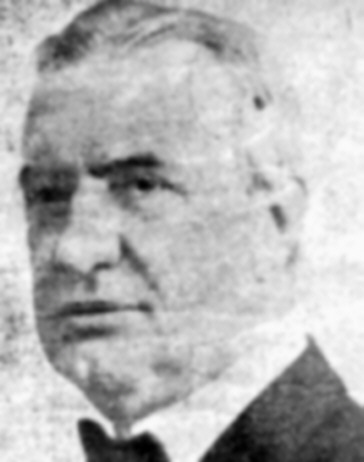
Constantin Argetoianu

- February 3 – Vasily Blokhin, Soviet executioner (b. 1895)
- February 6 – Constantin Argetoianu, 41st Prime Minister of Romania (b. 1871)
- February 9 – Ahmed Zaki Abu Shadi, Egyptian poet, publisher, doctor, bacteriologist and bee scientist (d. 1892)
- February 11 – Ona Munson, American actress (b. 1903)
- February 12
  - Tom Moore, Irish-American film actor (b. 1883)
  - S. Z. Sakall, Hungarian actor (b. 1883)
- February 20 – Oswald Avery, American physician and medical researcher (b. 1877)
- February 23 – Paul Claudel, French poet, dramatist and diplomat (b. 1868)
- February 27 – Trixie Friganza, American actress (b. 1870)

=== March ===
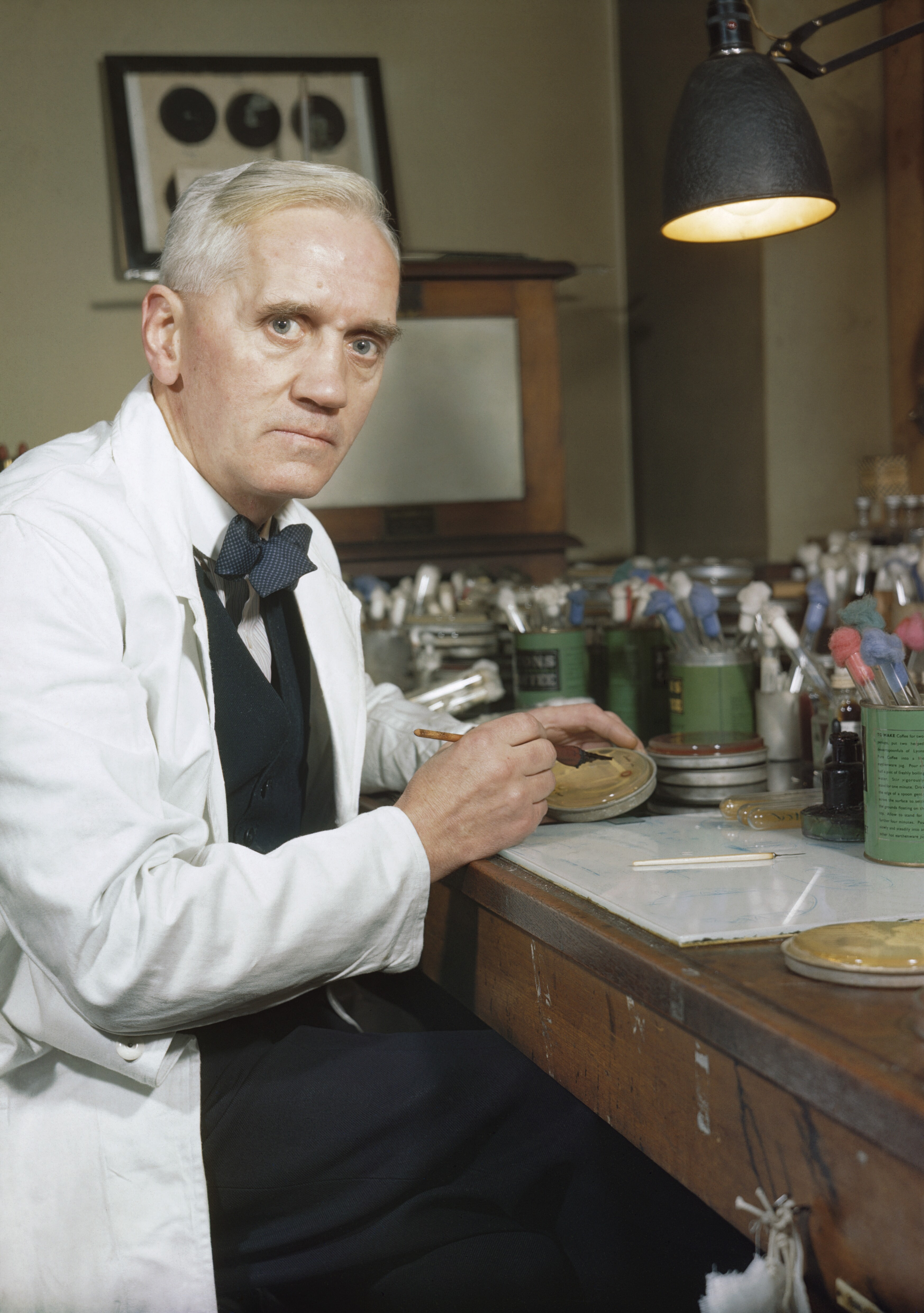
Sir Alexander Fleming

- March 3 – Katharine Drexel, American Roman Catholic foundress and saint (b. 1858)
- March 8 – William C. deMille, American screenwriter and director (b. 1878)
- March 9
  - Miroslava Stern, Czech-Mexican actress (b. 1926)
  - Matthew Henson, American explorer (b. 1866)
- March 11 – Sir Alexander Fleming, Scottish scientist, recipient of the Nobel Prize in Physiology or Medicine (b. 1881)
- March 12 – Charlie Parker, American saxophonist (b. 1920)
- March 14 – Ruth Poll, American lyricist and music publisher (b. 1899)
- March 16 – Nicolas de Staël, Russian painter (b. 1914)
- March 19 – Mihály Károlyi, 1st President of Hungary and 20th Prime Minister of Hungary (b. 1875)
- March 23 – Artur Bernardes, 12th President of Brazil (b. 1875)
- March 24 – John W. Davis, American politician, diplomat and lawyer (b. 1873)

=== April ===
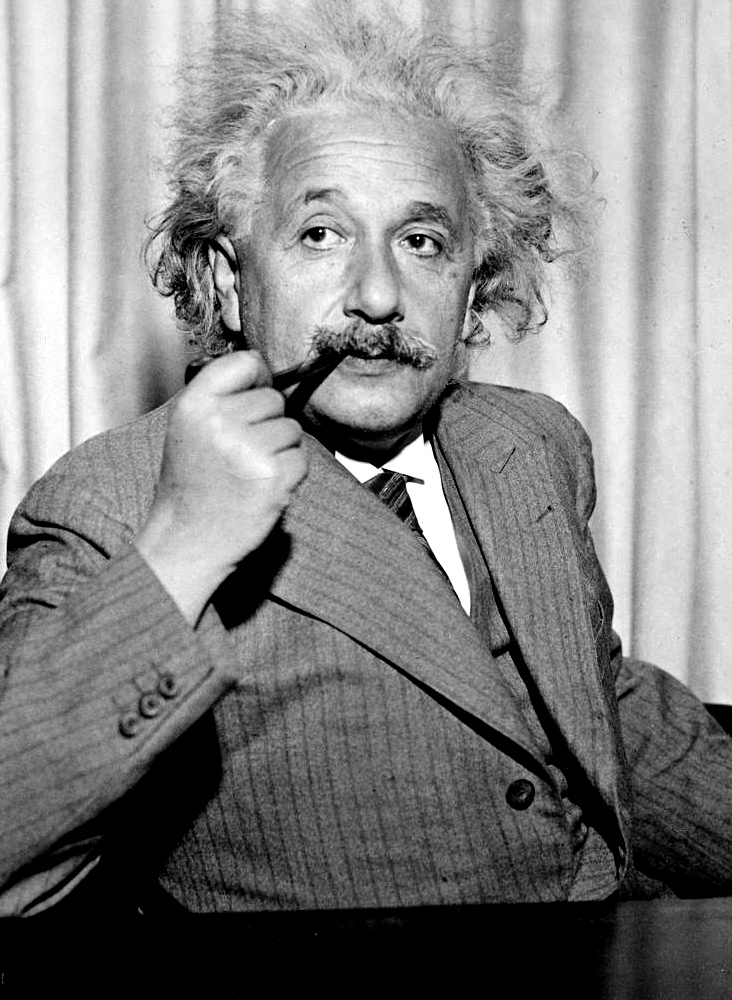
Albert Einstein

- April 5 – Tibor Szele, Hungarian mathematician (b. 1918)
- April 7
  - Theda Bara, American film actress (b. 1885)
  - Dániel Bánffy, Hungarian politician (b. 1893)
- April 10 – Pierre Teilhard de Chardin, French Jesuit priest, philosopher, paleontologist and geologist (b. 1881)
- April 11 – Clifton Sprague, American admiral (b. 1896)
- April 13 – Stanley Yale Beach, American aviation pioneer and entrepreneur (b. 1877)
- April 18 – Albert Einstein, German-born physicist, Nobel Prize laureate (b. 1879)
- April 19 – Jim Corbett, Anglo-Indian hunter, conservationist and author (b. 1875)
- April 24
  - Alfred Polgar, Austrian-born journalist (b. 1873)
  - Walter Seymour Allward, Canadian sculptor (b. 1874)
- April 25 – Constance Collier, English actress and acting coach (b. 1878)
- April 30 – John Henry Towers, American admiral and naval aviation pioneer (b. 1885)

=== May ===
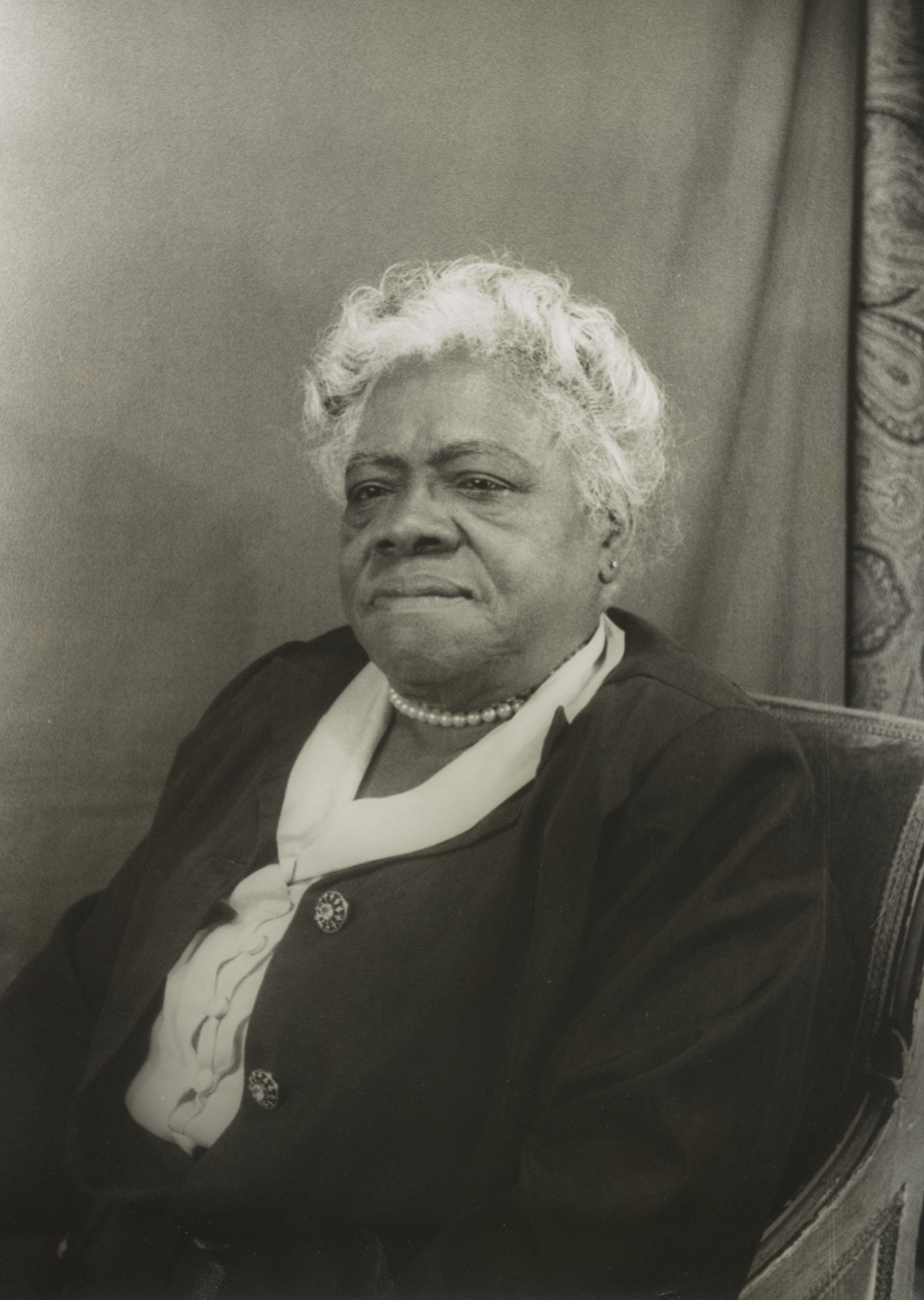
Mary McLeod Bethune

- May 2 – Alexander Hore-Ruthven, 1st Earl of Gowrie, 10th Governor-General of Australia (b. 1872)
- May 4
  - Louis Charles Breguet, French aircraft designer and builder and early aviation pioneer (b. 1880)
  - George Enescu, Romanian composer (b. 1881)
- May 10 – Tommy Burns, Canadian boxer (b. 1881)
- May 16 – James Agee, American writer (b. 1909)
- May 17 – Owen Roberts, American jurist (b. 1875)
- May 18 – Mary McLeod Bethune, American educator (b. 1875)
- May 19 – Concha Espina, Spanish writer (b. 1869)
- May 20 – Tetsuzō Iwamoto, Japanese fighter ace (b. 1916)
- May 26
  - Alberto Ascari, Italian racing driver (accident) (b. 1918)
  - John Alexander Cohen, Welsh Royal Air Force Officer (crash) (b. 1934)
- May 29 – Rudolf Klein-Rogge, German actor (b. 1885)
- May 30 – Bill Vukovich, American race car driver (accident) (b. 1918)

=== June ===
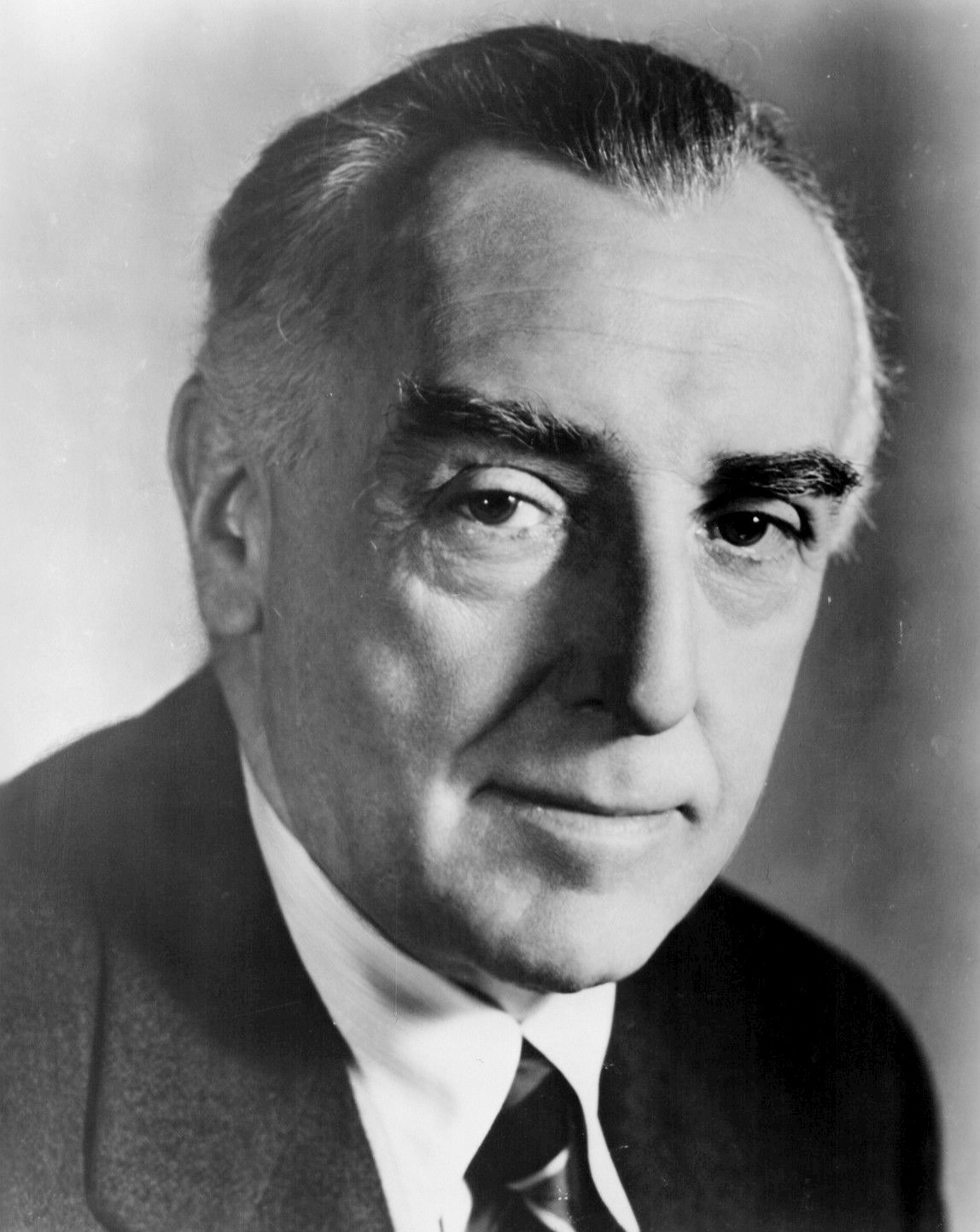
Walter Hampden

- June 3 – Barbara Graham, American criminal (executed) (b. 1923)
- June 10 – Margaret Abbott, American golfer (b. 1878)
- June 11 – Walter Hampden, American actor (b. 1879)
- June 12 – Redcliffe N. Salaman, British botanist (b. 1874)
- June 13 – Walter Braemer, German Nazi war criminal (b. 1883)
- June 17 – Carlyle Blackwell, American actor (b. 1884)
- June 26 – Engelbert Zaschka, German helicopter pioneer (b. 1895)
- June 27 – Harry Agganis, American college football player and professional baseball player (b. 1929)
- June 29
  - Gerhard Benkowitz, schoolteacher and resistance activist against the German Democratic Republic (b. 1923)
  - Max Pechstein, German painter (b. 1881)

=== July ===
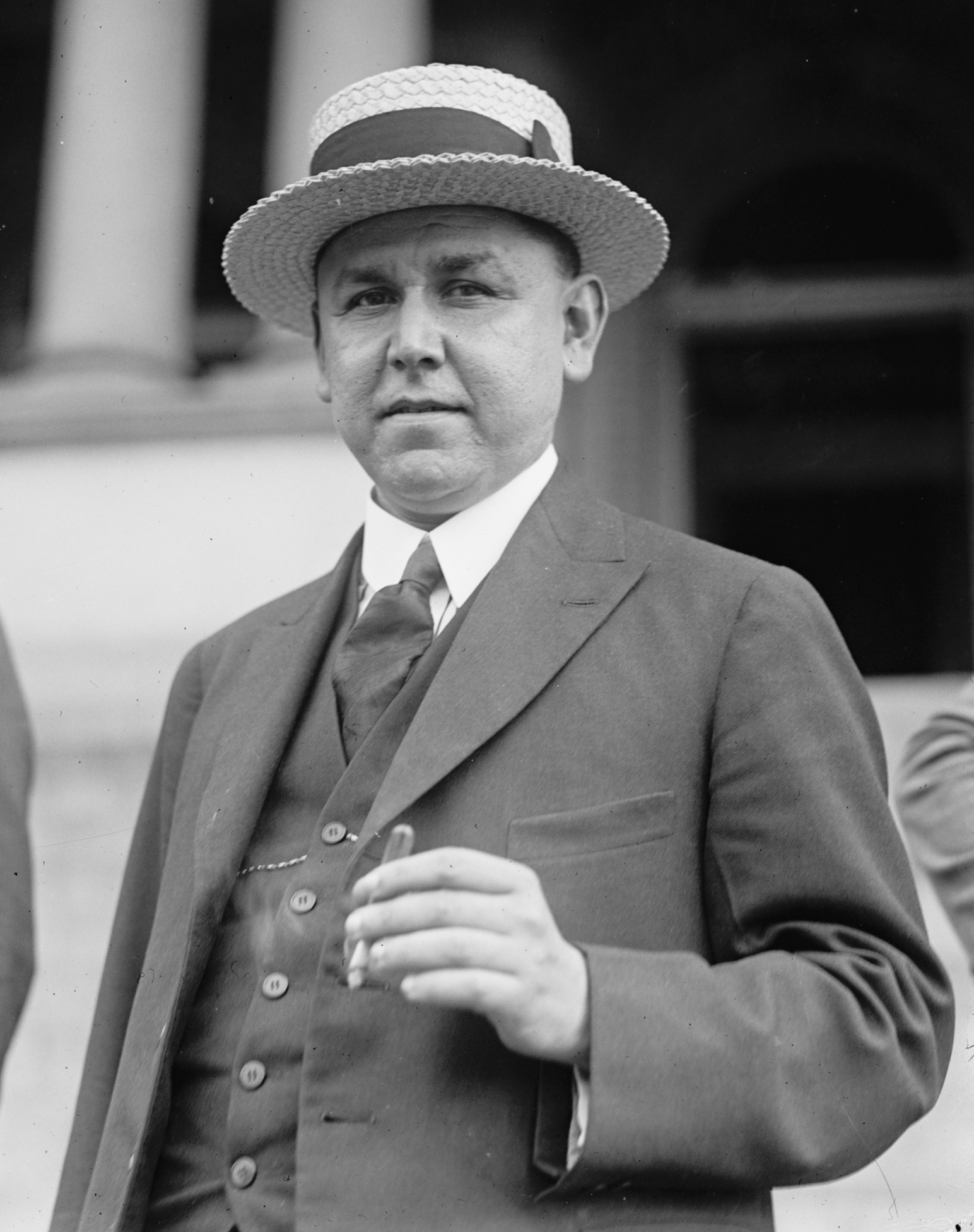
Adolfo de la Huerta

- July 3 – Adelbert Ames Jr., American scientist (b. 1880)
- July 9 – Adolfo de la Huerta, 38th President of Mexico (b. 1881)
- July 13
  - Ruth Ellis, British murderer, last woman to be executed in the United Kingdom (b. 1926)
  - Stanley Price, American film and television actor (b. 1892)
- July 20 – Calouste Gulbenkian, Armenian businessman and philanthropist (b. 1869)
- July 23 – Cordell Hull, United States Secretary of State, recipient of the Nobel Peace Prize (b. 1871)
- July 25
  - Isaak Dunayevsky, Soviet film composer and conductor (b. 1900)
  - Gertrude Beasley, American writer, feminist and memoirist (b. 1892)
- July 26 – Raymond C. Archibald, Canadian-American mathematician (b. 1875)
- July 29 – Catherine Backus, American sculptor (b. 1863)
- July 31 – Robert Francis, American actor (b. 1930)

=== August ===
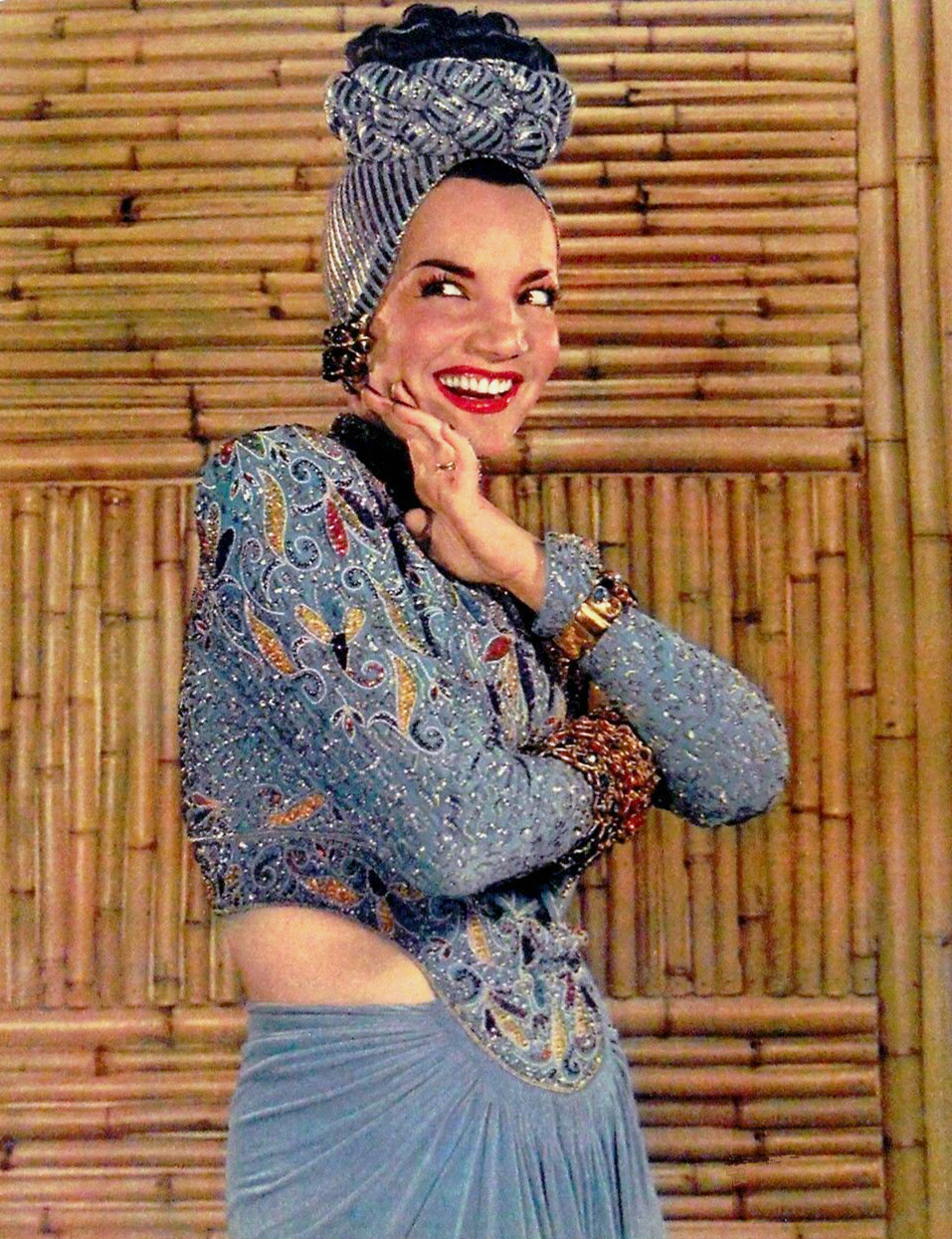
Carmen Miranda

- August 1 – William Hamilton, American Olympic athlete (b. 1883)
- August 2
  - Rupprecht, Crown Prince of Bavaria, Bavarian military leader and last Bavarian crown prince (b. 1869)
  - Wallace Stevens, American poet (b. 1879)
- August 5
  - Carmen Miranda, Portuguese-born Brazilian singer and actress (b. 1909)
  - Suzan Ball, American actress (b. 1933)
- August 9 – Marion Bauer, American composer, teacher, writer, and music critic (b. 1882)
- August 11 – Frank Seiberling, American inventor, co-founder of Goodyear Tire & Rubber Company (b. 1859)
- August 12
  - Thomas Mann, German novelist, Nobel Prize laureate (b. 1875)
  - James B. Sumner, American chemist, Nobel Prize laureate (b. 1887)
- August 13 – Florence Easton, English opera soprano (b. 1882)
- August 17 – Fernand Léger, French painter and sculptor (b. 1881)
- August 22 – Raymond Duval, French general (b. 1894)
- August 27 – Devere Allen, American socialist, pacifist political activist and journalist (b. 1891)
- August 28 – Emmett Till, American murder victim (b. 1941)
- August 31 – Willi Baumeister, German painter, scenic designer, art professor and typographer (b. 1889)

=== September ===
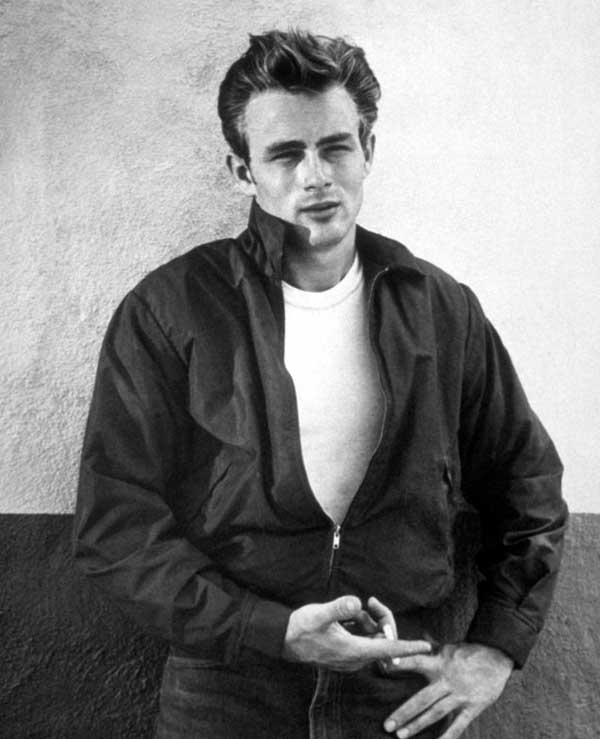
James Dean

- September 14 – Lagi von Ballestrem, part of German resistance to Nazism (b. 1909)
- September 16 – Leo Amery, British Conservative politician and journalist( b. 1873)
- September 20 – Robert Riskin, American screenwriter (b. 1897)
- September 23 – Martha Norelius, American Olympic swimmer (b. 1909)
- September 24 – Barclay Bailes, Australian rules footballer (b. 1883)
- September 30
  - Michael Chekhov, Russian actor, theatre director and writer (b. 1891)
  - James Dean, American actor (b. 1931)

=== October ===
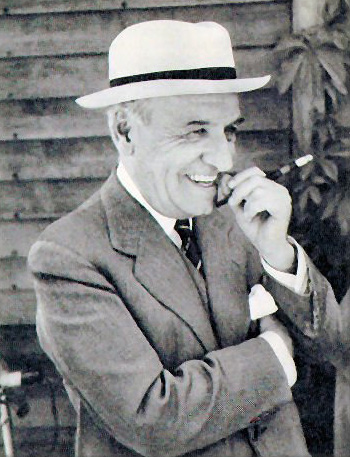
José Ortega y Gasset

- October 3 – Julius Ochs Adler, American publisher, journalist and United States Army major general (d. 1892)
- October 4
  - Alexander Papagos, Greek Field Marshal (b. 1883)
  - Stan Baumgartner, American baseball player (b. 1894)
- October 6 – Robert Munro, Scottish lawyer, judge and Liberal politician (b. 1868)
- October 7 – Rodolphe Seeldrayers, German journalist and administrator, 4th President of FIFA (b. 1876)
- October 9
  - Theodor Innitzer, Cardinal Archbishop of Vienna (b. 1875)
  - Alice Joyce, American actress (b. 1890)
- October 10 – F. Matthias Alexander, Australian actor and author (b. 1869)
- October 13
  - Manuel Ávila Camacho, 45th President of Mexico (b. 1897)
  - Alexandrina of Balazar, Portuguese Roman Catholic mystic, victim soul and blessed (b. 1904)
- October 17 – Dimitrios Maximos, Prime Minister of Greece (b. 1873)
- October 18 – José Ortega y Gasset, Spanish philosopher (b. 1883)
- October 19 – John Hodiak, American actor (b. 1914)
- October 22 – Cyril Alington, English educationalist, scholar, cleric and author (b. 1872)
- October 25 – Sadako Sasaki, Japanese atomic bomb sickness victim (b. 1943)
- October 27 – Juan de Dios Martínez, 23rd President of Ecuador (b. 1875)

=== November ===
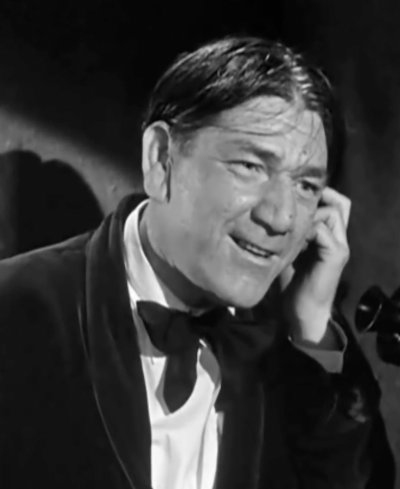
Shemp Howard

- November 1 – Dale Carnegie, American writer and lecturer (b. 1888)
- November 4 – Cy Young, American baseball player (Cleveland Spiders) and member of the MLB Hall of Fame (b. 1867)
- November 5 – Maurice Utrillo, French artist (b. 1883)
- November 6 – Edwin Barclay, 18th president of Liberia (b. 1882)
- November 7 – Tom Powers, American actor (b. 1890)
- November 12 – Alfréd Hajós, Hungarian swimmer and architect (b. 1878)
- November 14
  - Robert E. Sherwood, American playwright (b. 1896)
  - Ruby M. Ayres, British romance novelist (b. 1881)
- November 15 – Lloyd Bacon, American actor and director (b. 1889)
- November 17
  - James P. Johnson, American pianist and composer (b. 1894)
  - Helmuth Weidling, German general (b. 1891)
- November 20 – Tomasz Arciszewski, Polish socialist politician and 31st Prime Minister of Poland (b. 1877)
- November 22 – Shemp Howard, American actor and comedian (The Three Stooges) (b. 1895)
- November 27 – Arthur Honegger, French-born Swiss composer (b. 1892)

=== December ===
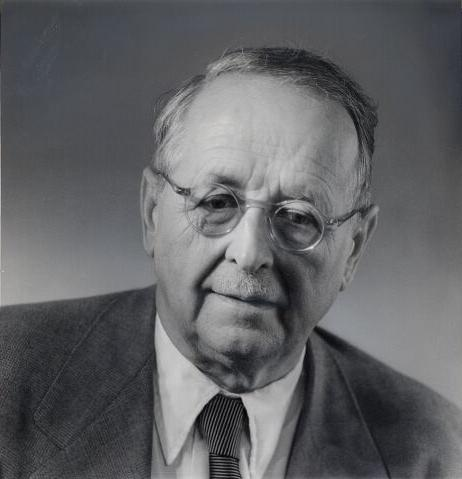
Hermann Weyl

- December 1 – Edward Grigg, 1st Baron Altrincham, British colonial administrator and politician (b. 1879)
- December 5 – Jirō Minami, Japanese general and Governor-General of Korea (1936–1942) (b. 1874)
- December 6 – Honus Wagner, American baseball player (Pittsburgh Pirates) and a member of the MLB Hall of Fame (b. 1874)
- December 8 – Hermann Weyl, German mathematician, theoretical physicist and philosopher (b. 1885)
- December 13 – António Egas Moniz, Portuguese neurologist, recipient of the Nobel Prize in Physiology or Medicine (b. 1874)
- December 14 – Paddy Mayne, Irish & British lions rugby international, Founding member of the S.A.S
- December 15
  - Otto Braun, German politician, Minister President of the Free State of Prussia (b. 1872)
  - Dorothy Bernard, American actress (b 1890)
- December 18 – Anna Murray Vail, American botanist (b. 1863)
- December 21 – Garegin Nzhdeh, Armenian statesman (b. 1886)
- December 22 – Mary Josephine Bedford, Australian philanthropist (b. 1861)
- December 24 – Nana Bryant, American actress (b. 1888)
- December 31 – Charles Ulrick Bay, American businessman and diplomat (b. 1888)

=== Unknown date ===
- Jnanadabhiram Barua, Indian Assamese language writer, dramatist, translator and barrister (b. 1880)

== Nobel Prizes ==

- Physics – Willis Eugene Lamb and Polykarp Kusch
- Chemistry – Vincent du Vigneaud
- Physiology or Medicine – Axel Hugo Theodor Theorell
- Literature – Halldór Kiljan Laxness
- Peace – not awarded
