= Frederic M. Lord =

- Born: November 12, 1912; Hanover, New Hampshire
- Died: February 5, 2000 (aged 87); Naples, Florida
- Education: Dartmouth College; University of Minnesota; Princeton University
- Occupation: Psychometrician
- Spouse: 2, including Muriel Kendall
- Children: 3 sons
- Relatives: Nathan Lord (great-great-grandfather)

Frederic Mather Lord (November 12, 1912 – February 5, 2000) was a psychometrician for Educational Testing Service. The SAT, GRE, GMAT, LSAT and TOEFL are all based on Lord's research.

== Early life ==
Lord was born on November 12, 1912, in Hanover, New Hampshire. His great-great-grandfather, Nathan Lord, served as the sixth president of Dartmouth College, from which Lord graduated with a bachelor's degree in Sociology in 1936. He later earned a master's degree in Educational Psychology from the University of Minnesota, followed by a PhD in Psychology from Princeton University in 1951.

== Career ==
Lord first worked for the Carnegie Foundation in 1944. By 1950, he began working for the Educational Testing Service (ETS). He was the source of much of the seminal research on item response theory, including two important books: Statistical Theories of Mental Test Scores (1968, with Melvin R. Novick, and two chapters by Allan Birnbaum), and Applications of Item Response Theory to Practical Testing Problems (1980).

Lord's research shaped the SAT, GRE, GMAT, LSAT and the TOEFL. Lord was called the "Father of Modern Testing" by the National Council on Measurement in Education.

== Personal life and death ==
Lord was married twice. He had three sons with his first wife. His second wife was Muriel Kendall.

Lord died on February 5, 2000, in Naples, Florida, at 87.
