= Doylestown, Ohio =

- Village
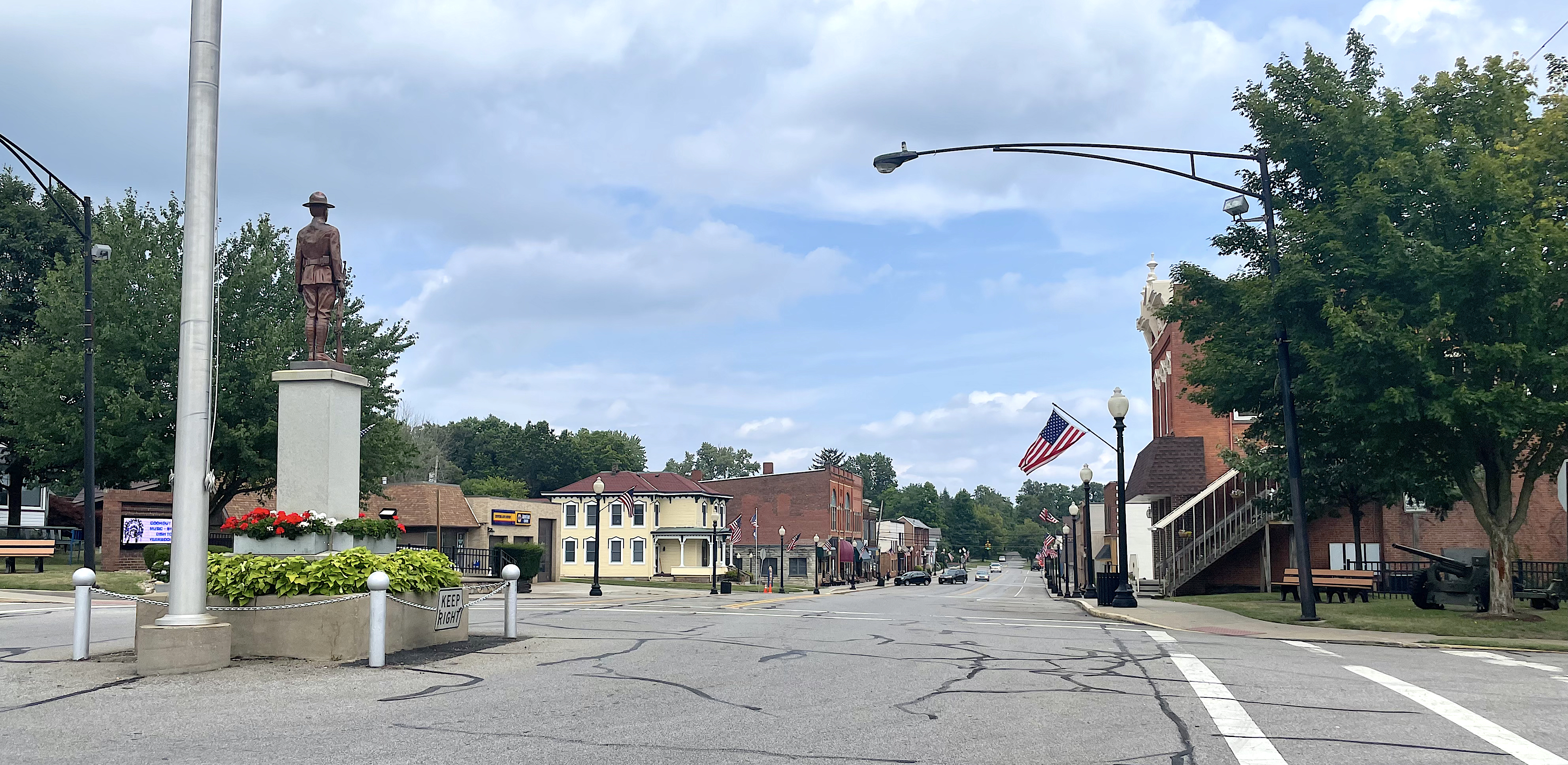
- Uptown Doylestown
- Motto: "Village Of Values A Town Of Tradition"
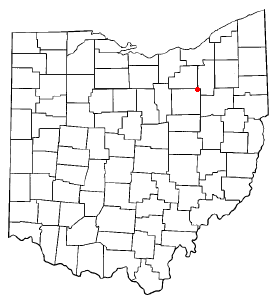
- Location of Doylestown, Ohio

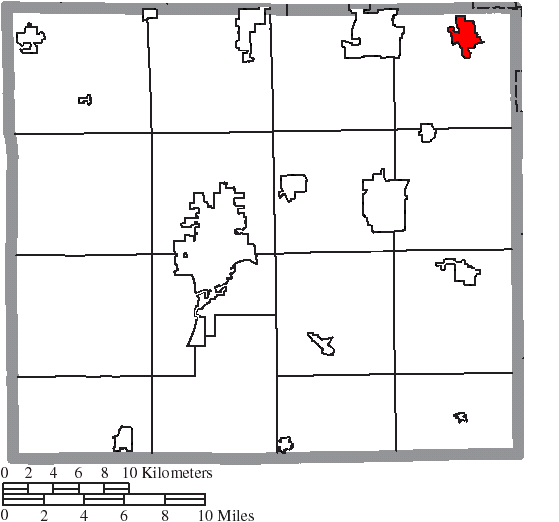
- Location of Doylestown in Wayne County
- Coordinates: 40°58′12″N 81°41′43″W
- Country: United States
- State: Ohio
- County: Wayne

Area
  - Total: 1.86 sq mi (4.82 km^{2})
  - Land: 1.86 sq mi (4.82 km^{2})
  - Water: 0 sq mi (0.00 km^{2})
- Elevation: 1,240 ft (380 m)

Population (2020)
  - Total: 3,051
  - Estimate (2023): 3,053
  - Density: 1,639.9/sq mi (633.18/km^{2})
- Time zone: UTC-5 (Eastern (EST))
  - Summer (DST): UTC-4 (EDT)
- ZIP code: 44230
- Area code: 330
- FIPS code: 39-22568
- GNIS feature ID: 2398747
- Website: http://www.doylestown.com/

Doylestown is a village located atop the highest point in Wayne County, Ohio, United States. It is surrounded by Chippewa Township and located 13 miles (21 km) southwest of Akron. The village was founded in 1827 when William Doyle laid out a 40-lot town site at the crossing of two Native American trails on a hilltop.

The population was 3,051 at the 2020 census.

== History ==
=== Initial settlement ===
In 1813, Thomas Frederick from Lancaster, Pennsylvania became the first settler to establish a homestead in what is now Doylestown. William Doyle, for whom the town was named, arrived in 1827 and purchased 50 acres from Frederick and two other early settlers. Doyle moved his family onto the land with the intent to found a new village. Five friends of Doyle's from Pennsylvania were convinced to bring their families and join Doyle to help settle the new village.

On December 9, 1827, the village was surveyed by Charles Christmas, one of the five men Doyle convinced to move from Pennsylvania. The survey was recorded on Christmas Day. The new village would contain 40 lots in what is now Uptown, the commercial district, of modern Doylestown. Soon after, with the help of another of the five families, Doyle built Doylestown's first building, a log cabin tavern. Franklin continued to own the land north of the platted village, and was unhappy with the development taking place which led to a feud with Doyle. This prevented development from extending in that direction until after Doyle moved from the area.

Also in 1836, the Village of Doylestown established its first Board of Education. The board purchased a tract of land from Frederick at what is now the intersection of Portage and Gates streets with the intention of establishing a school. A decade later the wood-frame school was replaced with a more permanent brick building which would be expanded vertically as the village grew through the 1850s.

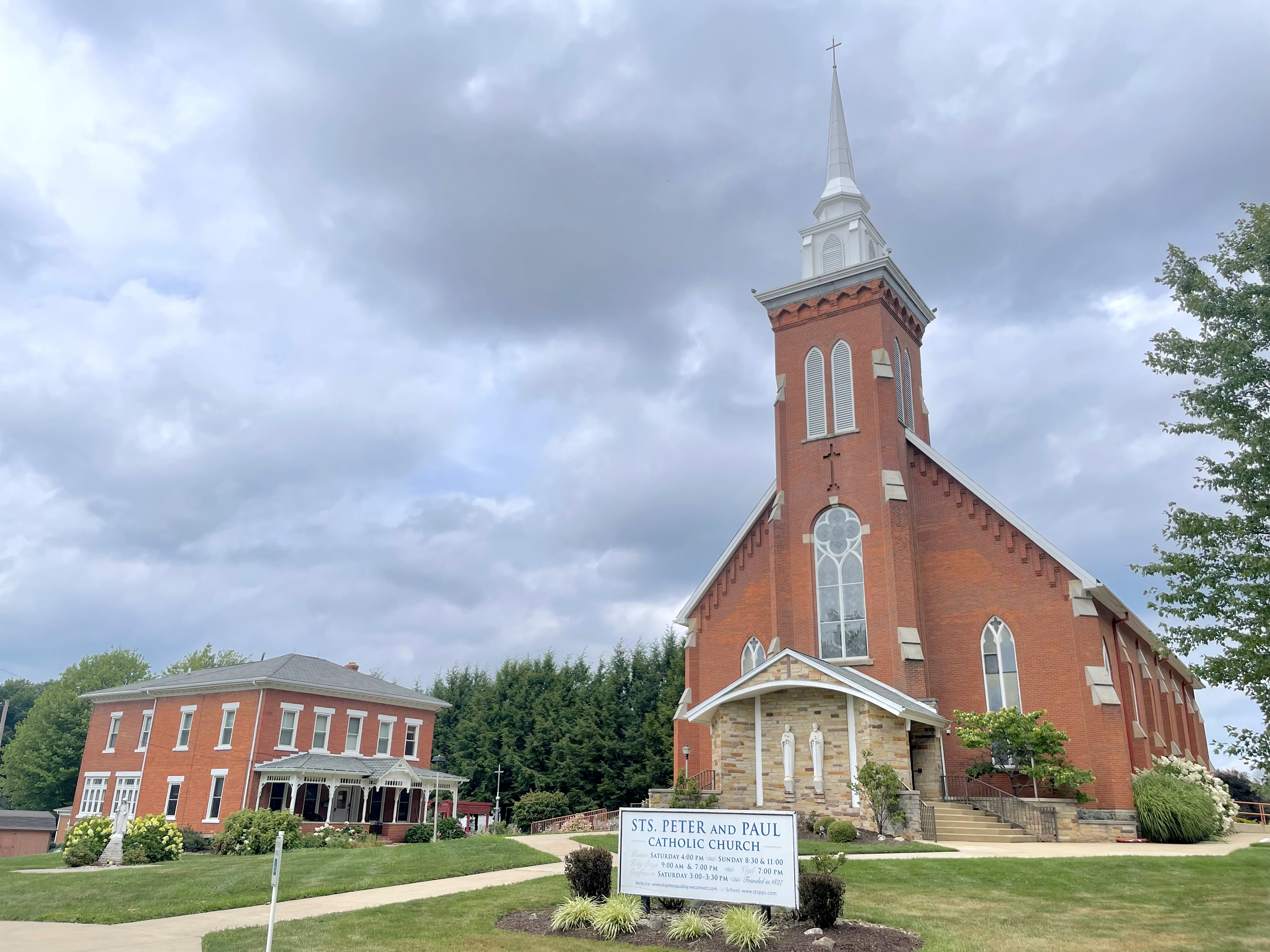
Sts. Peter and Paul campus; the cathedral on the right was constructed in 1877.

Many of these early buildings, as well as those which were constructed later, were built of brick. In 1834, brickmaking became an early industry in the Doylestown area when Abrahamm Franks built a kiln a quarter-mile southwest of the village site. Numerous other temporary brick works were established as needed nearby to construction sites around the village. Longer-lasting brick yards were established around Doylestown in 1867, 1872 and 1886.

Other early industries besides brick making included grain and wool mills, a tannery and a distillery, though primary among these early industries was coal mining which began to take off in the 1840s.

=== Coal and industrial boom ===
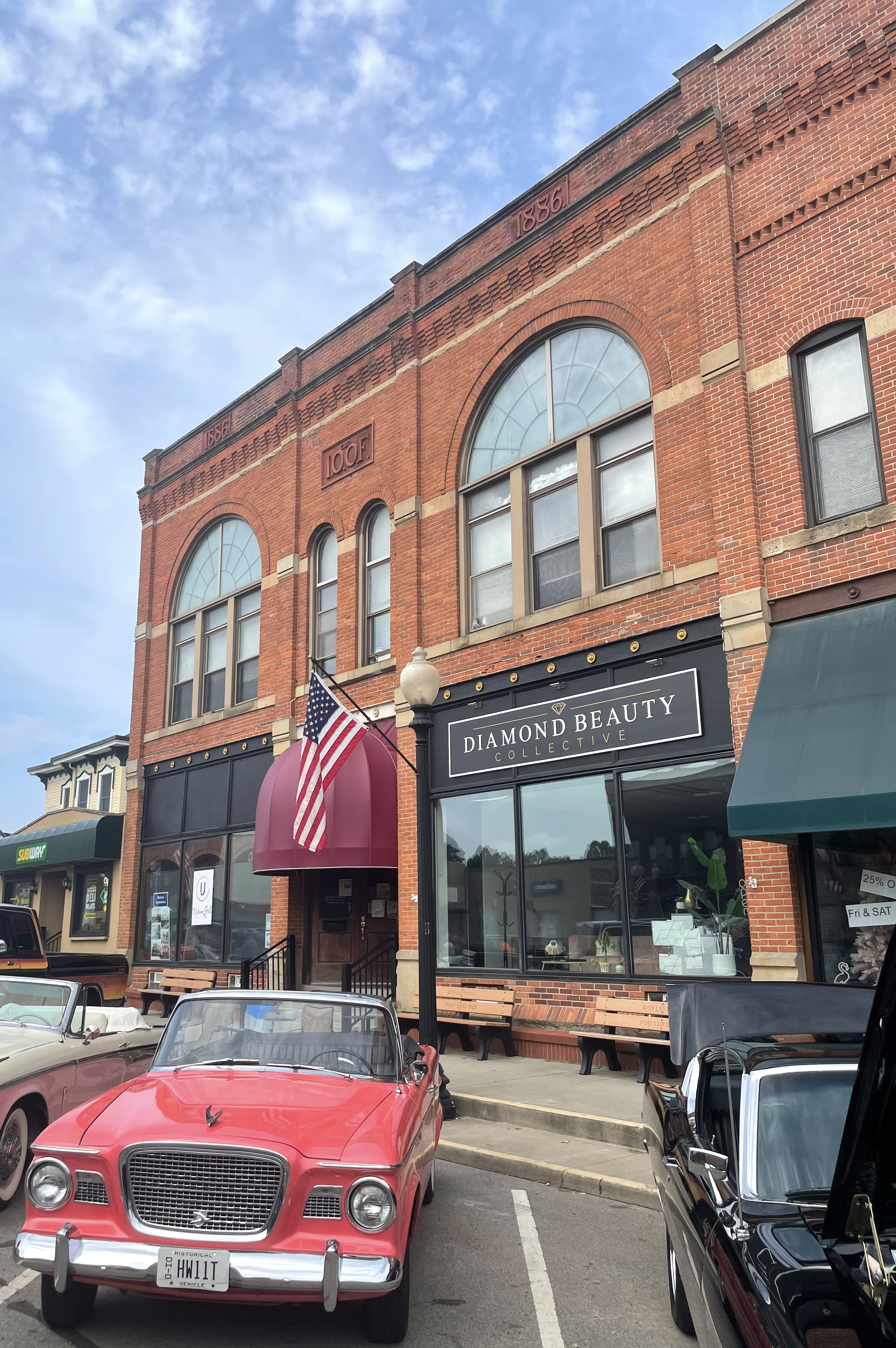
Brick building on Portage St., built 1886

A valley just downhill to the southeast of the village, initially known as Nibrara and later as Pleasant Valley, was initially settled during the early wave of immigration by Samuel Chidester. Early settlers in this area took advantage of the local coal deposits for small-scale use, but in 1840 a commercial mine was established by David Galehouse. It would transform "Pleasant Valley" into what became known as "Rogues' Hollow" and alter the trajectory of the adjacent village forever. Mines began to pop up throughout the hollow and the area became home to the first real industry in eastern Wayne County. Drinking and lawlessness became a hallmark of Rogues' Hollow as the population swelled with men working the mines. Between 1840 and 1940, when the last mine in the area closed, there had been at least 102 mines in operation.

As the mines attracted waves of new settlers and brought an influx of economic activity, secondary industries began to appear in Doylestown. John Seiberling arrived in 1860 to build a factory which would make mowing machines with a self-raking mower. A year later, Excelsior Mowers and Droppers was established in the village. A modernization of the plant was undertaken in 1887 and the growth was spurred on by workers from the coal mines, which were beginning to slow in their production.

=== Into the 20th century ===
After decades of coal-powered growth, the village saw its population surpass 1,000 by 1896. The commercial viability of the coal mines began to wane around 1900, and the mower industry took a major downturn in 1901 after a fire at the factory, but by that point Doylestown had become a fully established village. Some of the industry lost from the mines and machine-works was replaced with multiple aluminum product companies in the 1890s and 1900s.

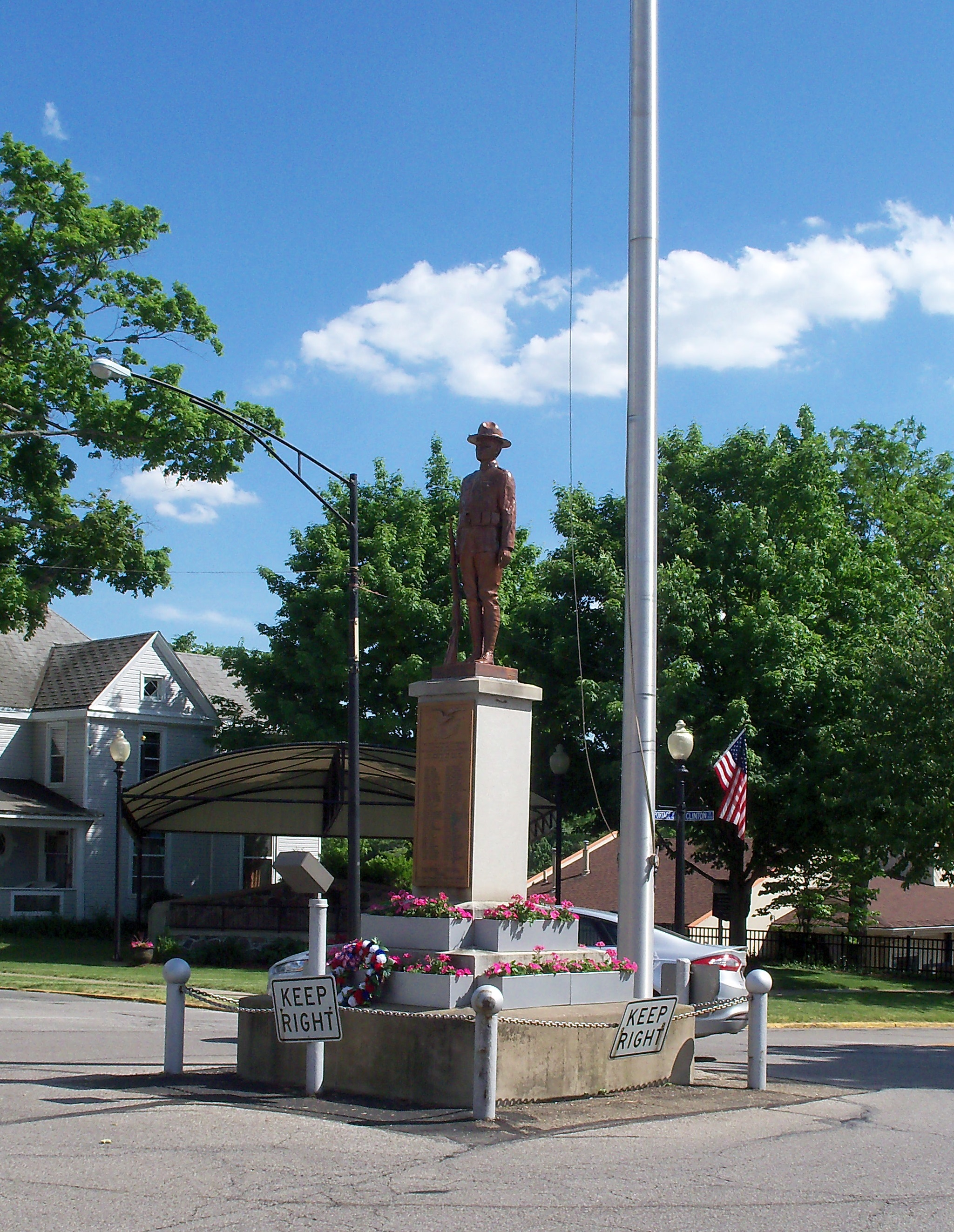
Doylestown's Doughboy statue

In 1909, continued growth led to the need for a larger school building on High Street. The 1884 building was dynamited and a replacement was constructed, with features intended for safety in the wake of the 1908 Collinwood school fire in nearby Cleveland.

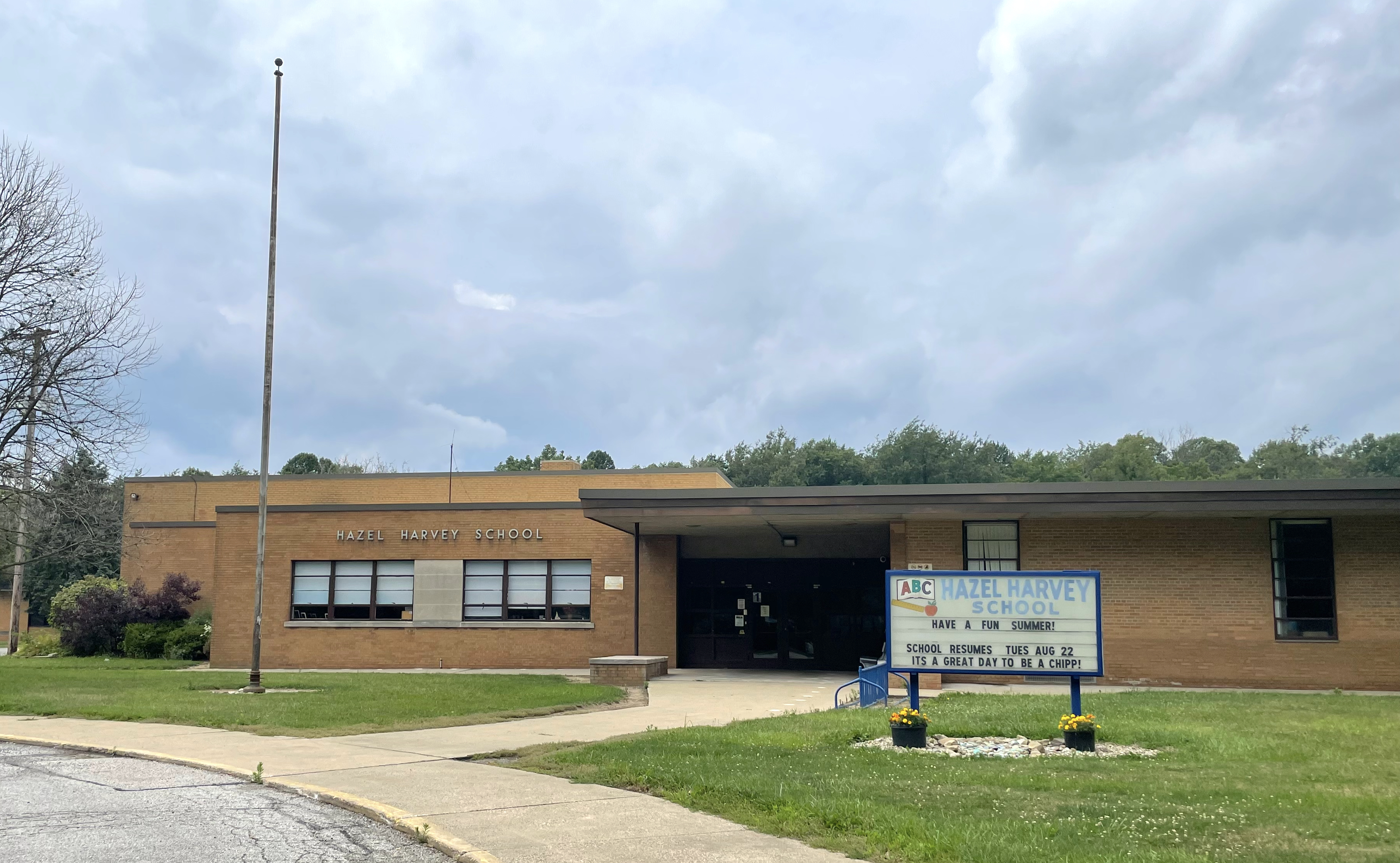
Hazel Harvey School built in 1956

Industry returned to Doylestown in the mid-century, albeit in a much smaller way than it had in the previous century, with the establishment of Midwest Container Co. in 1946. The company has produced various plastics from its establishment and continues to this day, as of 2023, though it is now known as Mid-West Poly Pak, Inc. Construction and agriculture remained important industries in Doylestown throughout the 20th century as well.

=== In the 21st century ===
Doylestown has lost the industrial character of its past, and as the 20th century moved into the 21st, has lost some of the agricultural character as well. Suburbanization emanating from nearby Akron and more distant Cleveland has given contemporary Doylestown an exurban feel, as it is now considered to be a bedroom community for larger cities in Northeast Ohio. With the exception of two small areas zoned for light industrial bordering Doylestown's municipal boundary, the entirety of the village is surrounded by areas zoned by Chippewa Township as "suburban residential", though much of the area is still used for agriculture as well.

== Geography ==
According to the United States Census Bureau, the village has a total area of 1.88 square miles (4.87 km^{2}), all of it land.

Doylestown is located atop a hill, with most of the town including the uptown area located at approximately 1,250 feet above sea level.

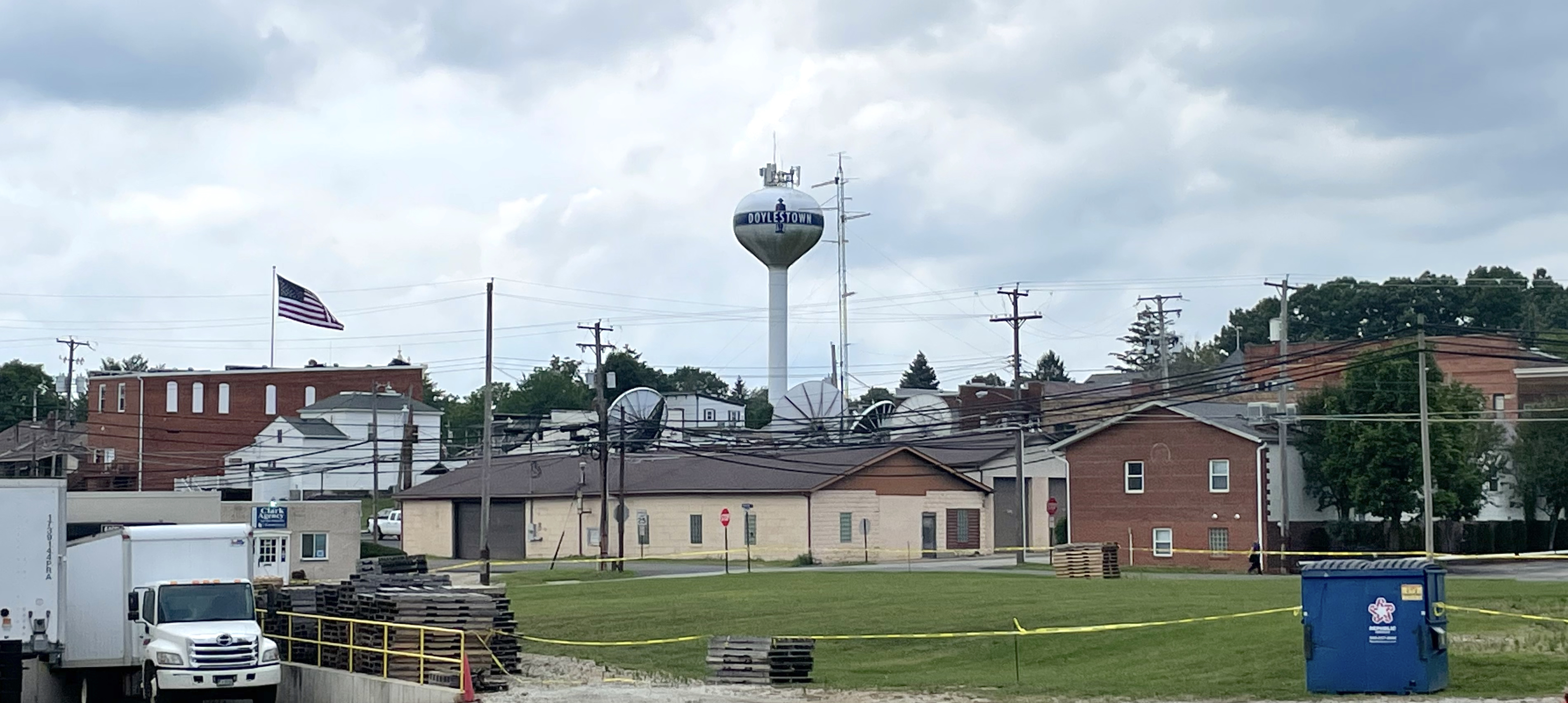
Doylestown's water tower rises from the crest of the hill

A handful of small streams begin at springs on the slopes of the hill and flow from the higher elevations into larger creeks surrounding the village. Silver Creek drains the town on the east, Mill Creek on the north and west, while Chippewa Creek drains the south side and collects both Mill and Silver Creeks. Where Silver Creek flows into Chippewa Creek just southeast of town, in Rogues' Hollow, the elevation is 950 feet.

The town is located in the far northeastern corner of Wayne County. The center of Doylestown is located about a mile south of the Medina and Summit County lines and about two miles from the Summit County line to the east as well. The Summit County cities of Norton, Barberton and New Franklin are located directly across the county line to the north, northeast and east, respectively.

Ohio State Route 585 skims the northern and eastern edges of the village as it heads southeast from Norton to Wooster. Ohio State Route 21 runs south–north about a mile east of the village beyond Silver Creek.

== Demographics ==
Historical population
Census	Pop.	Note	%±
1870	551		—
1880	1,040		88.7%
1890	1,131		8.8%
1900	1,057		−6.5%
1910	877		−17.0%
1920	1,037		18.2%
1930	1,150		10.9%
1940	1,259		9.5%
1950	1,358		7.9%
1960	1,873		37.9%
1970	2,373		26.7%
1980	2,493		5.1%
1990	2,668		7.0%
2000	2,799		4.9%
2010	3,051		9.0%
2020	3,051		0.0%
2023 (est.)	3,053	▲	0.1%
U.S. Decennial Census

=== 2020 census ===
As of the 2020 census, Doylestown had a population of 3,051. The median age was 44.3 years. 20.6% of residents were under the age of 18 and 23.3% of residents were 65 years of age or older. For every 100 females there were 91.2 males, and for every 100 females age 18 and over there were 89.7 males age 18 and over.

99.9% of residents lived in urban areas, while 0.1% lived in rural areas.

There were 1,262 households in Doylestown, of which 26.8% had children under the age of 18 living in them. Of all households, 51.5% were married-couple households, 15.2% were households with a male householder and no spouse or partner present, and 27.0% were households with a female householder and no spouse or partner present. About 28.7% of all households were made up of individuals and 14.6% had someone living alone who was 65 years of age or older.

There were 1,320 housing units, of which 4.4% were vacant. The homeowner vacancy rate was 1.9% and the rental vacancy rate was 4.5%.

Racial composition as of the 2020 census
Race	Number	Percent
White	2,884	94.5%
Black or African American	18	0.6%
American Indian and Alaska Native	3	0.1%
Asian	6	0.2%
Native Hawaiian and Other Pacific Islander	2	0.1%
Some other race	15	0.5%
Two or more races	123	4.0%
Hispanic or Latino (of any race)	53	1.7%

=== 2010 census ===
As of the census of 2010, there were 3,051 people, 1,206 households, and 827 families residing in the village. The population density was 1,622.9 inhabitants per square mile (626.6/km^{2}). There were 1,292 housing units at an average density of 687.2 per square mile (265.3/km^{2}). The racial makeup of the village was 97.9% White, 0.6% African American, 0.1% Native American, 0.2% Asian, 0.4% from other races, and 0.9% from two or more races. Hispanic or Latino of any race were 1.4% of the population.

There were 1,206 households, of which 31.9% had children under the age of 18 living with them, 53.1% were married couples living together, 11.4% had a female householder with no husband present, 4.1% had a male householder with no wife present, and 31.4% were non-families. 27.9% of all households were made up of individuals, and 12.6% had someone living alone who was 65 years of age or older. The average household size was 2.45 and the average family size was 2.98.

The median age in the village was 41.6 years. 24.8% of residents were under the age of 18; 6.9% were between the ages of 18 and 24; 21.9% were from 25 to 44; 27.7% were from 45 to 64; and 18.8% were 65 years of age or older. The gender makeup of the village was 46.3% male and 53.7% female.

=== 2000 census ===
As of the census of 2000, there were 2,799 people, 1,119 households, and 782 families residing in the village. The population density was 1,590.3 people per square mile (614.0 people/km^{2}). There were 1,167 housing units at an average density of 663.0 per square mile (256.0/km^{2}). The racial makeup of the village was 98.89% White, 0.14% African American, 0.04% Native American, 0.11% Asian, 0.21% from other races, and 0.61% from two or more races. Hispanic or Latino of any race were 0.61% of the population.

There were 1,119 households, out of which 32.8% had children under the age of 18 living with them, 57.3% were married couples living together, 9.6% had a female householder with no husband present, and 30.1% were non-families. 26.5% of all households were made up of individuals, and 11.0% had someone living alone who was 65 years of age or older. The average household size was 2.44 and the average family size was 2.95.

In the village, the population was spread out, with 24.8% under the age of 18, 6.9% from 18 to 24, 27.7% from 25 to 44, 24.5% from 45 to 64, and 16.0% who were 65 years of age or older. The median age was 40 years. For every 100 females there were 89.1 males. For every 100 females age 18 and over, there were 85.4 males.

The median income for a household in the village was $47,969, and the median income for a family was $57,400. Males had a median income of $39,766 versus $25,701 for females. The per capita income for the village was $21,408. About 3.5% of families and 5.2% of the population were below the poverty line, including 6.7% of those under age 18 and 4.1% of those age 65 or over.

== Education ==
Doylestown is served by a branch of the Wayne County Public Library. The public education is run by Chippewa Local Schools, which contains Hazel Harvey Elementary (for grades PK-2), Chippewa Intermediate School (for grades 3-6), and Chippewa Jr./Sr. High School (for grades 7-12).

== Notable people ==
- Linda Allard, fashion designer for Ellen Tracy
- Reaves Baysinger, former head football coach at Syracuse University
- Edward Thomson Fairchild, third President of New Hampshire College

== Gallery ==
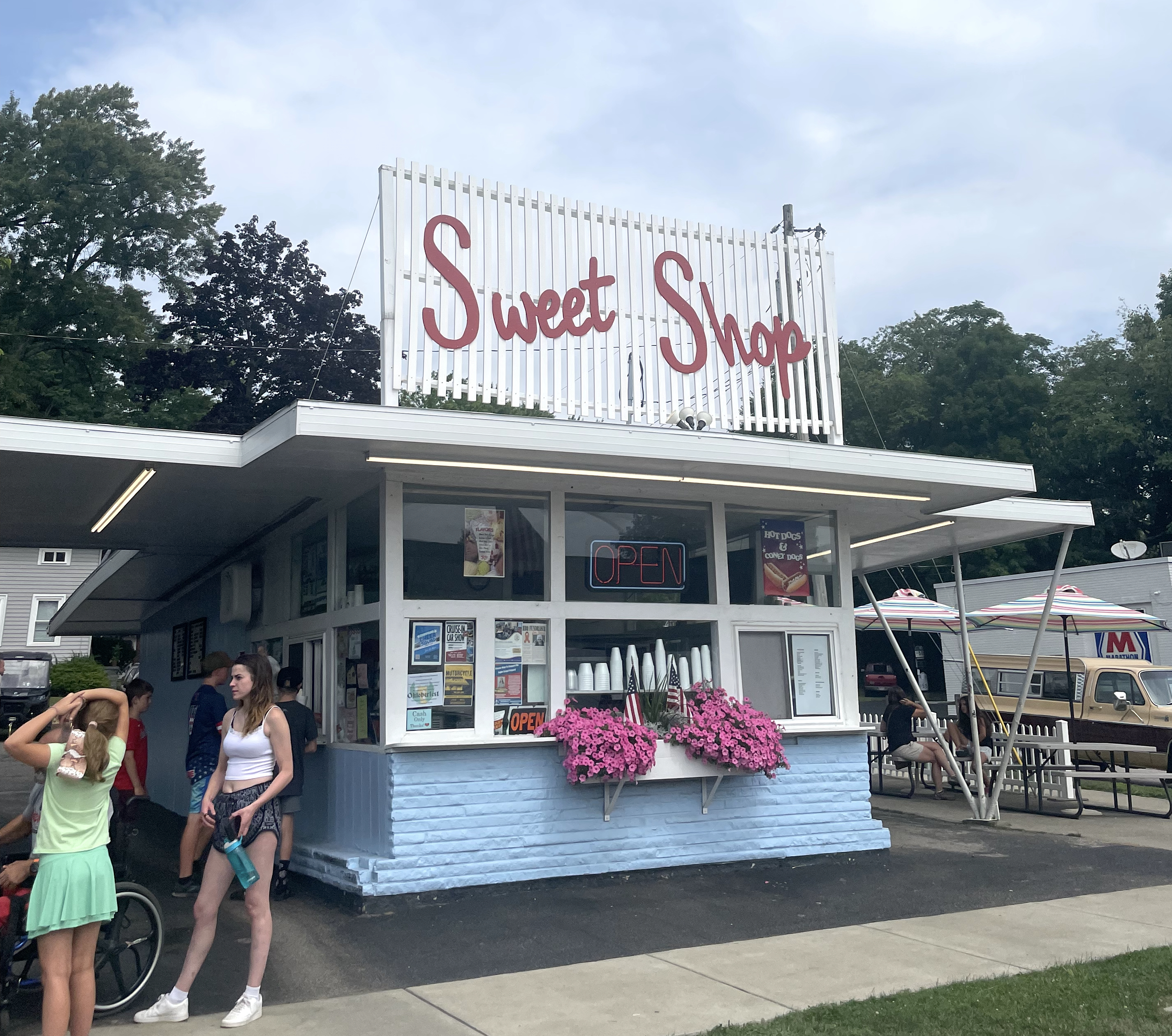
The Sweet Shop, a summertime staple since the mid-20th century

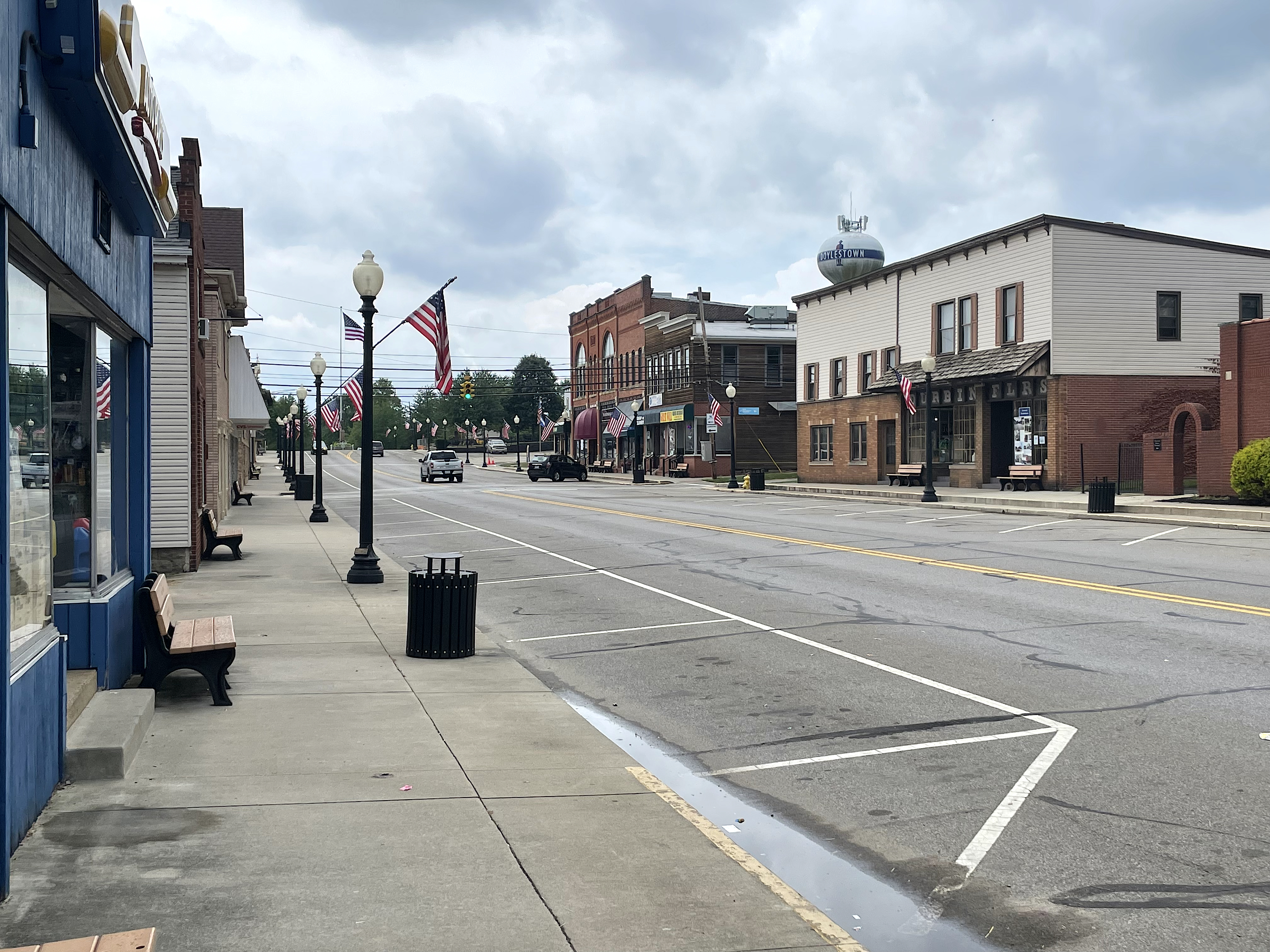
Shops and businesses along Portage Street and the village's only stop light

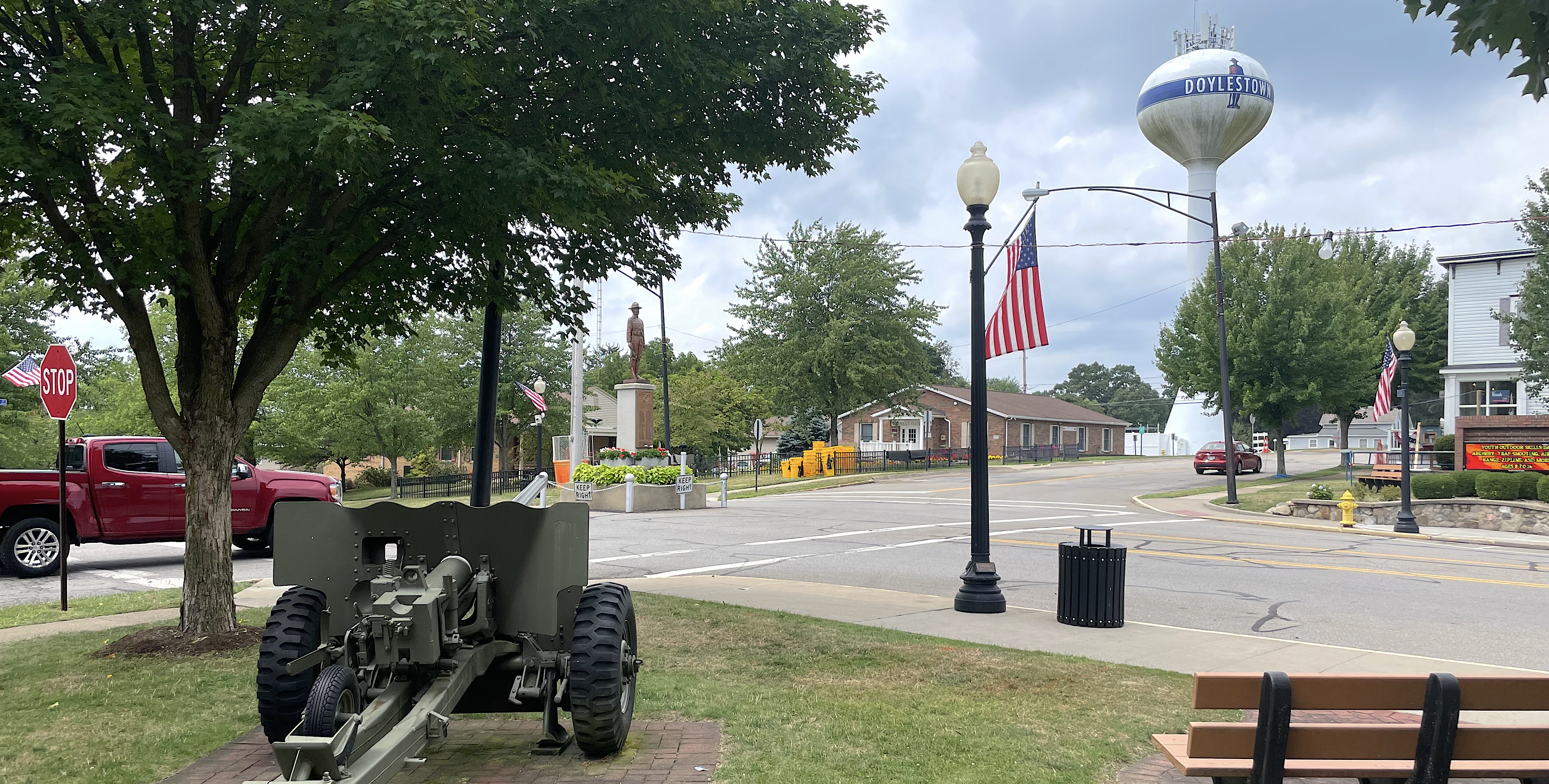
Public square with park, statue, Village Hall and Police Department

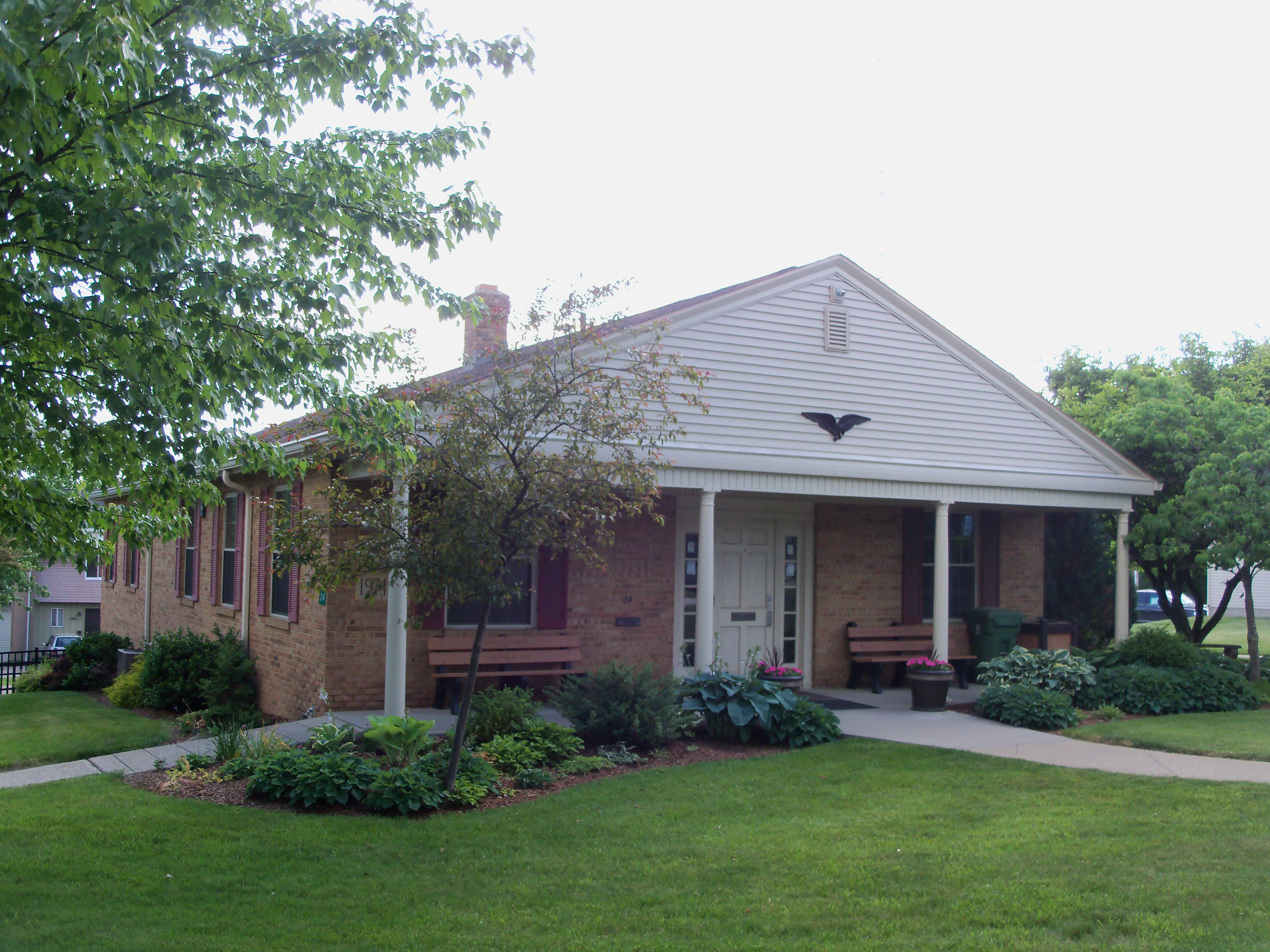
Village Hall
