= Joseph Bartlett Eastman =

Transportation official (1882-1944)

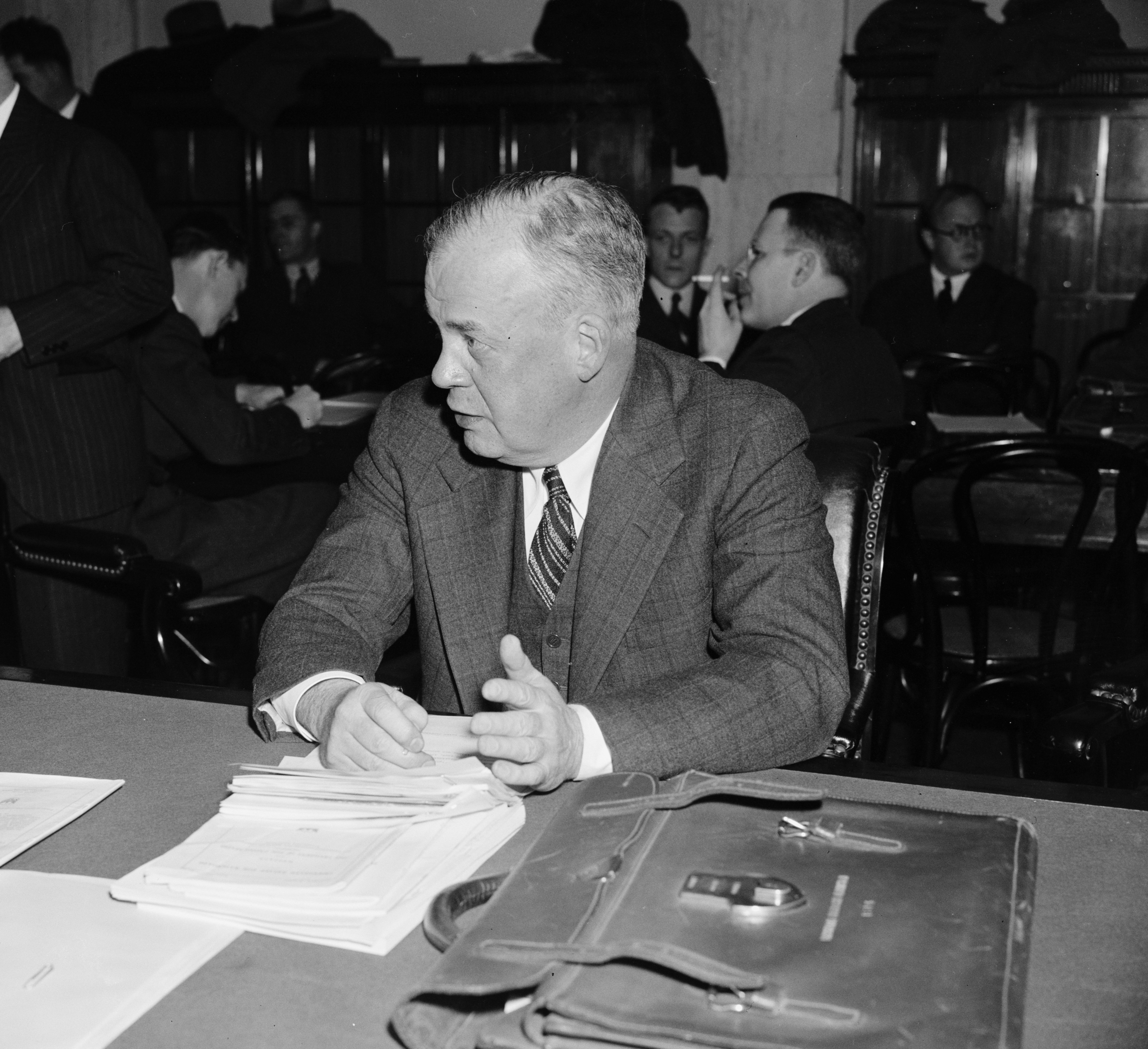
Eastman in 1939

Joseph Bartlett Eastman (June 26, 1882 – 1944) was a member of the Interstate Commerce Commission from 1919 until his death in 1944.

== Biography ==
Joseph Bartlett Eastman was born in Katonah, New York on June 26, 1882, to John Huse and Lucy (King) Eastman.

He prepared at Pottsville Area High School in Pennsylvania, then matriculated to Amherst College, graduating Phi Beta Kappa in the class of 1904.

In 1905 he was the Amherst Fellow at South End House in Boston, Massachusetts; from 1906 to 1913 he was secretary of the Public Franchise League in Boston. From 1907 to 1908 he attended Boston University Law School. He made his reputation as counsel in various wage arbitrations from 1913 to 1914.

From 1915 to 1918 he was a member of the Public Service Commission of Massachusetts; in 1918 he was chairman of the War Committee National Association of Railway and Public Utility Commissioners; and he was appointed a member of the Interstate Commerce Commission in 1919.

In 1933, he was nominated by Franklin D. Roosevelt, and confirmed by the Senate, to the position of Federal Coordinator of Transportation.

He died on March 15, 1944. The Archives and Special Collections at Amherst College holds his papers.
