= Edward Fairchild =

Edward Fairchild may refer to:

- Edward Henry Fairchild (1815–1889), American educator
- Edward T. Fairchild (judge) (1872–1965), American jurist and legislator
- Edward Thomson Fairchild (1866–1917), President of the New Hampshire College of Agriculture and Mechanical Arts
- Ned Fairchild (1929–2015), pen name of Nelda Fairchild, American songwriter
