= Asa Smith =

Asa Smith may refer to:

- Asa Dodge Smith (1804–1877), president of Dartmouth College
- Asa Smith (politician) (1829–1907), warden of the Borough of Norwalk, Connecticut
