= United South End Settlements =

Settlement houses and museum in Boston, US

- Founded: 1960
- Location: South End, Boston, Massachusetts, US
- Area Served: South End and Lower Roxbury
- Website: www.uses.org
- Legal Status: 501(c)(3) organization

The United South End Settlements (USES) consist of four settlement houses, founded as part of the Settlement movement to provide services such as daycare, education, and healthcare to improve the lives of the poor, and a children's museum dating back to 1891. With their slogan of "neighbors helping neighbors since 1891", the United South End Settlements continues to serve Boston's South End and Lower Roxbury community today. USES has grown and evolved over time to remain relevant to the South End.

== History ==
The history of USES began in 1891 when William J. Tucker founded what was to become known as the South End House at 6 Rollins Street. The South End House would be the first of its kind "in Boston and the fourth one in the United States." Before the incorporation of the final five organizations into USES, the Federation of South End Settlements was formed in 1950. The Federation of South End Settlements was made up of the South End House, Lincoln House (1892), Hale House (1895), Harriet Tubman House (1904), Ellis Memorial House, and Eldridge House. This federation was founded in order to create a larger pool of funds for the organizations to share. Eventually the Ellis Memorial and Eldridge Houses would disassociate themselves in 1959, and the four remaining houses and the Children's Art Centre would unite to become the United South End Settlements in January 1960.

USES originally focused on providing services to "[improve] housing, public health, and sanitation, developing day care programs that included medical care for children, and creating mental health programs." Specifically, USES' "residents established milk stations, public baths, dispensaries, and services, such as emergency loan and stamp savings programs" USES also founded "specialized schools for industrial, vocational, and employment training for both women and men" to create more opportunity in the South End neighborhood. Culture and arts were not forgotten in the South End either as USES provided "free concerts, art exhibitions, reading rooms, and a variety of social, drama, and literary clubs" for its residents. As of 2014, USES still provides many of the same services that it has all along, incorporating the technology of today into its programs and curriculums for the residents of the South End and Lower Roxbury community.

== Programs ==
- After School Program

52 children, aged 5–12 years, are accepted into the USES After School Program. The program's mission is to "support school success and promote the social, cognitive, and emotional development of the students." This program runs the full year while school is in session, and during summer and vacation days.

- Camp Hale

Camp Hale is offered to both boys and girls aged 6–14 years during the summer months. Summer sessions are divided by age and gender (e.g., all-girls ages 8-14 years). Camp Hale was founded on the principle that "all youth, particularly those from urban environments, will benefit from challenging opportunities for physical, mental, and social growth and development."

- Children's Art Centre

The Children's Art Centre offers three annual events and five programs to youth ages 3 months to 15 years. The Centre "provides arts opportunities that foster community interaction, self-expression, and development of skills in the arts through hands-on arts education."

- Early childhood education

Infant-toddler and preschool programs available for 66 children aged 3 months to 6 years old. The Early Childhood Education program was established to prepare children "emotionally, academically and physically" for kindergarten.

- Harriet Tubman Gallery

Located and 566 Columbus Ave., the Harriet Tubman Gallery is FREE to all visitors. Gallery is open from 8:00AM to 8:00PM, Monday-Friday.

- Senior services

USES provides community and arts classes as well as hot meal and home repair services to the senior citizens (50–62 years) of the South End and Lower Roxbury.

- Thrive in 5

This "school readiness" program was established in 2010 by the United Way of Massachusetts Bay and Merrimack Valley and Thomas M. Menino. USES acts of the hub of Thrive in 5 for the South End and Lower Roxbury neighborhood.

- Workforce readiness

USES offers six different programs to help provide the South End/Lower Roxbury residents with opportunities for success.

- Learn At Work
- Adult Basic Education
- ESOL
- Technology Education
- Transition to College
- ACCUPLACER Test

=== Past programs ===
- Chinese Youth Services Program
- Cooperative Economic Development Youth Program
- Family Support Program
- Furniture Store
- Housing Counseling Program
- Neighborhood Revitalization / Economic Development Program
- Older Adults Program (now "Senior Services")
