= Daniel Dana =

American minister and college president

The Reverend Daniel Dana

4th President of Dartmouth College
- In office 1820–1821
- Preceded by: Francis Brown
- Succeeded by: Bennet Tyler

Personal details
- Born: July 24, 1771 Ipswich, Massachusetts
- Died: August 26, 1859 (aged 88) Newburyport, Massachusetts
- Spouses: Elizabeth Coombs (m. 1800) Sarah Emery (m. 1814)

Daniel Dana (July 24, 1771 – August 26, 1859) was an American Presbyterian minister in Newburyport, Massachusetts, and president of Dartmouth College from 1820 to 1821. He graduated from Dartmouth in the class of 1788.

== Biography ==
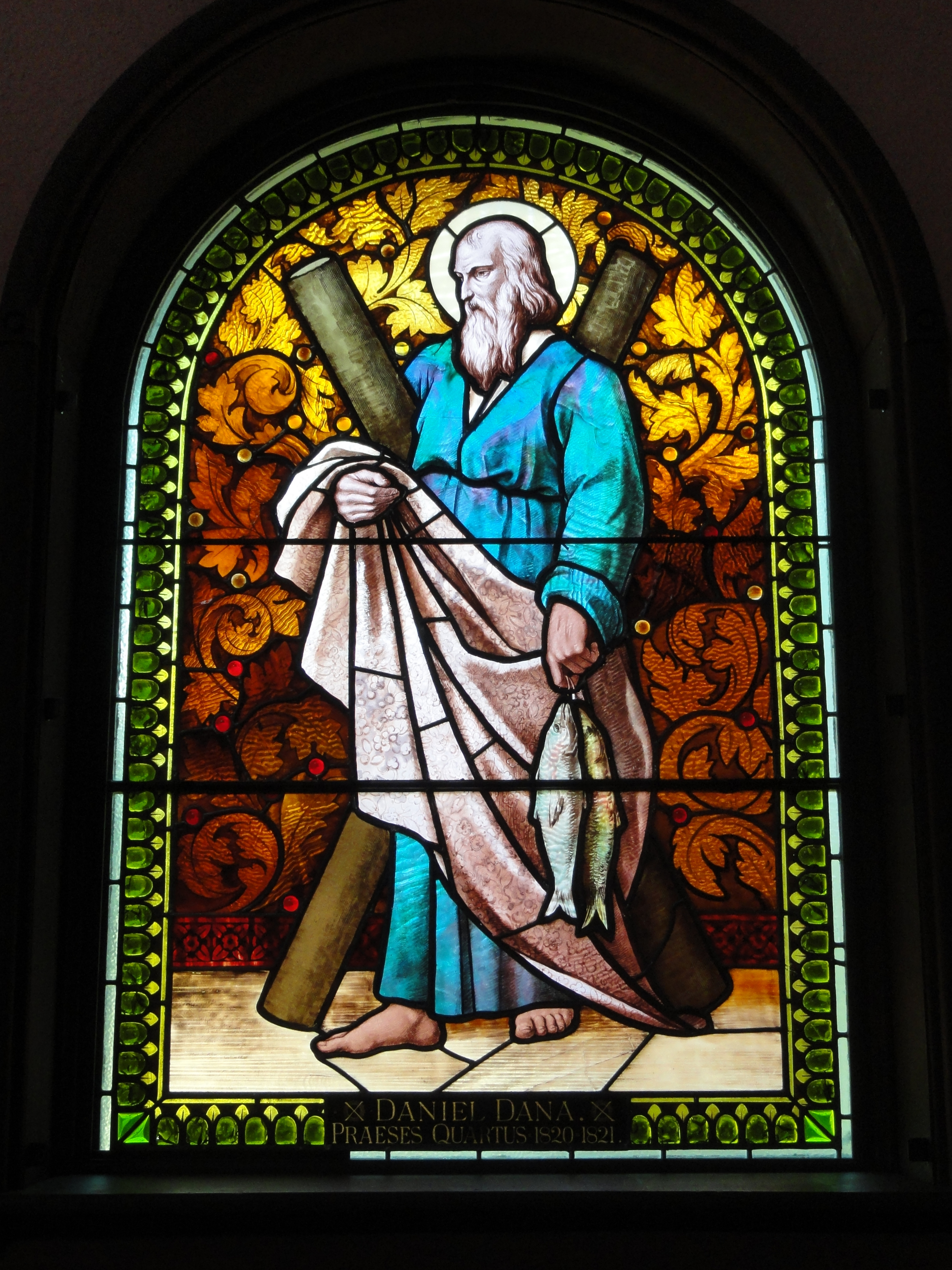
Stained glass depiction of Dana in Dartmouth's Rollins Chapel

Daniel Dana was born in Ipswich, Massachusetts on July 21, 1771.

He was married twice, to Elizabeth Coombs on December 30, 1800, and to Sarah Emery on November 8, 1814.

Dana was reluctant to take on the presidency of an institution so recently embattled following the Dartmouth College case. He was finally convinced by the Trustees to become the fourth president in the Wheelock Succession in August 1820. Plagued by ill health and exhausted by the strain of the presidency, he resigned less than a year later, in May 1821.

He died in Newburyport on August 26, 1859.

== Works ==
- The public characters of 1798 (1798) (contributor)
- Memoirs of Eminently Pious Women: Who Were Ornaments to their Sex---Blessings to their Families---and Edifying Examples to the Church and World (1803)
- The Deity of Christ (1810)
- Hints on Reading: An Address Delivered in the Ipswich Female Seminary, January 15, 1834 (1834)
- Letters to the Rev. Professor Stuart: Comprising Remarks on his Essay on Sin, Published in the American Biblical Repository for April and July, 1839 (1839)
- The New Song :A Sermon, Delivered in Bowdoin-Street Church, Boston (1849)
