= William Jewett Tucker =

The Reverend William Jewett Tucker
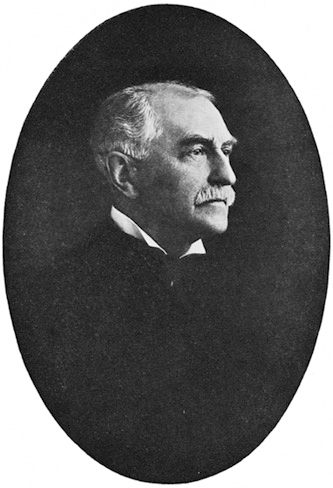

9th President of Dartmouth College
- In office 1893–1909
- Preceded by: Samuel Colcord Bartlett
- Succeeded by: Ernest Fox Nichols

Personal details
- Born: July 13, 1839 Griswold, Connecticut, US
- Died: September 29, 1926 (aged 87) Hanover, New Hampshire, US
- Spouses: Charlotte H. Rogers (m. 1870) Charlotte B. Cheever (m. 1887)

William Jewett Tucker (July 13, 1839 – September 29, 1926) was an American Congregational minister who served as the 9th President of Dartmouth College in New Hampshire, United States, from 1893 to 1909.

== Biography ==
William Jewett Tucker was born in Griswold, Connecticut on July 13, 1839. He graduated from Dartmouth in 1861 and studied for the ministry at Andover Theological Seminary. Ordained in 1867, he was a Congregational pastor in Manchester, New Hampshire, and, later, in New York City. He returned to Andover in 1879 as professor of sacred rhetoric and became an editor of the Andover Review and a founder of South End House, one of Boston's first settlement houses for the poor. At Andover, he was a central figure in the "Andover Controversy" of 1886–92, when charges were filed against five professors calling for a liberalization of Congregational views. In 1890, the Supreme Court of Massachusetts declared the proceedings "faulty"; in 1892, all five professors, Tucker included, were "acquitted."

He married Charlotte H. Rogers on June 22, 1870, and they had two children. On June 23, 1887, he remarried to Charlotte B. Cheever, and they had one child.

Tucker died in Hanover, New Hampshire on September 19, 1926.

== Dartmouth presidency ==
The New York City American, in a September 30, 1926 obituary notice, wrote of William Jewett Tucker that he "was known in New England as 'the great president,' who brought Dartmouth from the position of a small New Hampshire college to that of a great national educational institution." One of the college's most beloved leaders, William Jewett Tucker was said to have "refounded Dartmouth," bringing its facilities, its curriculum and every aspect of its organization into the modern era. When he assumed the presidency in 1893, the college was in debt, there were only slightly over 300 students and there was no central physical facilities plant. When he stepped down in 1909 more than 20 new buildings had been erected, including a central steam plant; the student body had grown to over 1,100 students from across the country and around the world; the faculty had increased from 26 to 81; and the curriculum had been broadened.

Tireless in his efforts to build the physical college, President Tucker was also equally devoted to articulating a moral and spiritual dimension for Dartmouth and for higher education nationwide. In numerous books and essays he called for a liberalization of American theology and commitment to public service.

William Jewett Tucker retired from the Dartmouth presidency in 1909 and became president emeritus. Although retired, he remained an active figure on the public stage and lived in Hanover until his death in 1926.

The William Jewett Tucker Center, commonly known as the Tucker Center, at Dartmouth College, is named after President Tucker.
