= Charles S. Murkland =

American academic administrator (1856–1926)

Charles Sumner Murkland

1st President of New Hampshire College
- In office July 3, 1893 – May 1, 1903
- Preceded by: Asa Dodge Smith
- Succeeded by: William D. Gibbs

Personal details
- Born: May 30, 1856 Lowell, Massachusetts
- Died: November 11, 1926 (aged 70)
- Education: Middlebury College; Harvard Divinity School; Dartmouth College

Charles Sumner Murkland (May 30, 1856 – November 11, 1926) was the first elected President of the New Hampshire College of Agriculture and the Mechanic Arts following the college's move from Hanover to Durham in the United States. While a scholar and executive, his lack of an agricultural background made him a surprising choice for the position. While President, Murkland proposed adding preparatory classes and a two-year degree and during his first year Graduate study was also established.

== Biography ==
On May 30, 1856, Murkland was born in Lowell, Massachusetts. He attended Middlebury College and graduated in 1881, as valedictorian of his class. He then attended Harvard Divinity School, receiving a Bachelor of Divinity. In 1884, Murkland completed his Master of Arts from Middlebury and also completed one year of post-graduate study at Andover Theological Seminary. After completing school, Murkland served as a pastor in Chicopee, Massachusetts and Manchester.

On May 18, 1893, the New Hampshire College of Agriculture and the Mechanic Arts Board of Trustees elected Murkland as president of the college. His term began on July 3, 1893, and he was inaugurated on August 30, 1893, becoming the college's first and second elected president. While President, Murkland received a Doctor of Divinity from Middlebury in 1900, and a Ph.D. from Dartmouth College in 1903.

== President of New Hampshire College ==
Murkland served as President of the college from 1893 to 1903. He advocated adding preparatory courses and a two-year degree to the college. It is said that Murkland's strong liberal arts and theological background contributed to his conflict with those who believed that the college should emphasize only agricultural sciences. Murkland argued for a broad interpretation of the Morrill Act, which would require the college to try to meet the needs of all groups within the state. The Board of Trustees took issue with Murkland's statement concerning the possible addition of classical languages to the curriculum.

Murkland greatly contributed to the growth and expansion of the college. During his administration, the student body, faculty and staff doubled in size. Morrill Hall, an agricultural building, was constructed during Murkland's presidency. After accomplishing most of what he set out to do and also feeling the duties of his position conflicted with his teaching duties, Murkland presented his resignation to the Board of Trustees effective May 1, 1903.

- Murkland Hall at the University of New Hampshire is the center of the university's College of Liberal Arts and is named for Charles Murkland.
