= James Wright (historian) =

American historian (1939–2022)

16th President of Dartmouth College
- In office August 1, 1998 – July 1, 2009
- Preceded by: James Oliver Freedman
- Succeeded by: Jim Yong Kim

Personal details
- Born: August 16, 1939 Madison, Wisconsin, U.S.
- Died: October 10, 2022 (aged 83) Hanover, New Hampshire, U.S.
- Education: University of Wisconsin-Platteville; University of Wisconsin-Madison
- Website: Official website

James Wright (August 16, 1939 – October 10, 2022) was an American writer and academic administrator who was the President of Dartmouth College and the Eleazar Wheelock Professor of History at Dartmouth. The 16th President in the Wheelock Succession, he served as Dartmouth president from 1998 until 2009. He joined the Dartmouth History Department in 1969 and served as dean of faculty from 1989 to 1997 and as provost from 1997 to 1998. Wright received a bachelor's degree from the University of Wisconsin–Platteville and a masters and doctoral degree in history from the University of Wisconsin–Madison. He died at his home in Hanover, New Hampshire, on October 10, 2022.

== Early life ==
James Wright grew up in Galena, Illinois, a small Midwestern town in the 1950s, the son of a World War II veteran. He enlisted in the U.S. Marine Corps in 1957, at age 17. Three years later upon his discharge he went to college. He worked as a laborer in a cheese plant and as a janitor, bartender, and night watchman in order to pay for his education. He also worked at the local zinc mines, including working as a powderman, setting dynamite charges. Encouraged by his undergraduate faculty mentors and enabled by the Danforth Fellowship, he went on to graduate school and became an academic.

== Presidency at Dartmouth College ==
As president, Wright's priorities included advancing the academic strength of the institution and expanding the faculty, enhancing the out-of-the-classroom experience, strengthening Dartmouth's historic commitment to a strong and inclusive sense of community, building and renovating Dartmouth's facilities and strengthening the college's financial resources. He worked to more fully integrate the professional schools into the intellectual life of the college. During his presidency undergraduate applications grew by 79 percent and the student body became increasingly diverse, with students of color and international students representing more than 40 percent of the student body. The college also made significant improvements to the financial aid program, including: tripling the budget for undergraduate aid, expanding its need-blind admissions policies to include international students, eliminating loans for all students and offering free tuition to students who come from families with incomes at or below $75,000.

President Wright focused on advancing the academic strength of the college by expanding and diversifying the faculty, resulting in more than 10 percent growth in the faculty of the Arts & Sciences, an 8:1 student-faculty ratio, and the highest percentage of tenured women faculty in the Ivy League and among the highest percentage of faculty of color. The three professional schools all participated in similar patterns of growth and improvement.

Leading the college's $1.3 billion campaign - the largest fund-raising effort in its history - Wright provided additional resources for faculty support, including the creation of more than 20 new endowed professorships, increased compensation and research funding, and the construction of Berry and Rauner Special Collections Libraries, Carson Hall, Moore Hall, Kemeny Hall, and the Haldeman Center. Wright enhanced the out-of-classroom experience by investing in new residence halls and off-campus housing for students, renovating or building new athletic and recreation facilities, and subsidizing student tickets to the Hopkins Center and athletic events. Under his stewardship, the college's endowment and annual fundraising more than doubled, with more than 67 percent of all alumni/ae making gifts to the Campaign for the Dartmouth Experience.

== Work with veterans ==
In 2005, Wright began a series of visits to U.S. military medical facilities in Washington, D.C., where he met Marines and other U.S. military personnel who had been wounded in the course of service in Iraq and Afghanistan. In his over thirty visits since then, he has encouraged injured servicemen and women to continue their education.

President Wright worked with Senators Jim Webb, John Warner, and Chuck Hagel on language for the GI Bill that was passed by Congress and signed by President Bush in June 2008, to provide a means for private institutions to partner with Veterans Affairs in supporting veterans who matriculated at these institutions (the "Yellow Ribbon Program"). He also worked with the American Council on Education (ACE) to create a new educational counseling program for wounded U.S. veterans. It has served several hundred injured veterans since 2007, and continues today at Walter Reed National Military Medical Center at Bethesda, Maryland.

He served as an honorary co-chair for the fall 2008 and the fall 2009 dinner of the Iraq-Afghanistan Veterans of America. President Wright wrote the Spring 2008 cover story on veterans in higher education for The Presidency, a publication of the American Council on Education for college and university presidents. He spoke about some of this work on February 2, 2009, at the annual meeting of the National Association of Independent Colleges and Universities.

After stepping down from the Dartmouth presidency in 2009, Wright focused on support of veterans and research, writing, and public speaking on matters relating to education and veterans. His scholarly work as a political historian has extended to include military history and questions about American culture and war.

On Veterans Day 2009, Wright spoke at the Vietnam Veterans Memorial in Washington, D.C. at the invitation of the Vietnam Veterans Memorial Fund. As the Jefferson Memorial Lecturer at the University of California, Berkeley in February 2010, he delivered "War Veterans and American Democracy" and was a participant in a follow-up panel about veterans.

Wright lectured and participated in discussions at Texas A&M University, the University of Wisconsin-Madison, Norwich University, Rollins College, and the United States Military Academy at West Point, as well as Seoul National University and at Yonsei University in Seoul.

Wright was a speaker at the 2012 Sun Valley Writers’ Conference (he had earlier spoken at the Conference in 2002), and in 2013 he was the speaker for the Veterans Day Program at the Abraham Lincoln Library. He participated in a “National Veterans’ Strategy Roundtable” organized by the House Committee on Veterans Affairs and convened at the Library of Congress in September 2013. Wright was one of the speakers at the 2014 Veterans Day Symposium of Veterans on Wall Street, hosted by Goldman Sachs. Other speakers included General Martin Dempsey and Bob Woodruff.

In his 44th year at Dartmouth, Wright taught a senior seminar on America's wars in the winter term of 2013 and again in 2014. He also wrote articles that appeared in online publications, such as Foreign Affairs, The Atlantic, and the Huffington Post. The theme that runs through all of these is the way that American society largely ignores those who fight and sacrifice in the country's wars.

Wright was a commentator in the Harvard Business School case study and supporting film produced by Linda Bilmes. This deals with the merging of the Walter Reed and Bethesda Hospitals. He also participated in director Ric Burns's film, "Debt of Honor: A History of Disabled Veterans in America," which was shown at the New York Historical Society on November 9, followed by a panel discussion with Ric Burns, James Wright, Charles Marmar, and Jose Rene "J.R." Martinez. The film, which aired nationally on PBS on November 10, 2015, examines the rise of disabled veterans in the country. Improved battlefield medicine has led to fewer wartime fatalities, but also to more severe injuries for survivors. Veterans of each war have come home to different attitudes about their service and their war, which has had long-reaching effects on their recovery.

James Wright served on the Board of the Semper Fi Fund/America's Fund.

In 2019, donors created the James Wright Chair of Transnational Studies to honor his legacy at Dartmouth. Jason Lyall in the Government Department is the inaugural holder of this chair.

== Awards and societies ==
- Social Science Research Council Grant, a Guggenheim Fellowship, and a Charles Warren Fellowship at Harvard
- Elected to the American Academy of Arts and Sciences
- Member of the Organization of American Historians
- Featured by The New York Times for work with injured veterans, May 2007
- "ABC World News with Charles Gibson" - "Person of the Week," Memorial Day Weekend 2007
- New Englander of the Year by New England Council
- Council of college and Military Educators “President’s Award," February 2008
- Semper Fidelis Award by Marine Corps Scholarship Foundation, April 2008
- Commendation from General James Conway, Commandant of the Marine Corps, March 2009
- Invitation to throw out the “first pitch” from Boston Red Sox for contributions to education and to supporting veterans, June 2009
- Commander-in-Chief's Gold Medal of Merit Award and Citation by Veterans of Foreign Wars, August 2009
- Eleanor M. McMahon Award for Lifetime Achievement from the New England Board of Higher Education, March 2010

== Key publications ==
An American historian, Wright was the author or editor of six books. His most recent book, Enduring Vietnam: An American Generation and Its War, published by St. Martin's Press was released April 2017.

Those Who Have Borne the Battle: A History of America’s Wars and Those Who Fought Them, published by Public Affairs Press, was introduced in April 2012 at a Washington event hosted by the Center for a New American Security. In the book, Wright provides a historical overview of American views of wars and those who have fought them, from the American Revolution to the current wars, and shares some of his own experiences and insights. The book received wide critical acclaim, and was selected by the New York Times Book Review for an "Editors' Choice" recommendation.

Forever New: The Speeches of James Wright, President of Dartmouth College, 1998–2009, edited by Sheila Culbert, was published by UPNE (University Press of New England, 2012).

The early books he authored or edited included The Galena Lead District: Federal Policy and Practices, 1824–1847 (1966); The West of the American People (1970); The Politics of Populism: Dissent in Colorado (1974); The Great Plains Experience: Readings in the History of a Region (1978); and The Progressive Yankees: Republican Reformers in New Hampshire (1987).
