= Herbert Gallen =

American businessman (1915–2007)

- Born: September 15, 1915; Paterson, New Jersey
- Died: September 22, 2007 (aged 92); Demarest, New Jersey
- Occupations: Clothes manufacturer; businessperson
- Known for: Chairman and owner of Ellen Tracy, Inc.
- Spouse(s): Betty Barr (before 1998) Linda Allard (m. 2000)

Herbert Gallen (September 15, 1915 — September 22, 2007) was an American businessperson. He was chairman and owner of Ellen Tracy, Inc., a manufacturer of women's business clothing, for over 50 years until 2003 when the company was sold to Liz Claiborne, Inc. for $180 million.

== Career ==
Gallen grew up in Paterson, New Jersey, the son of a fabric manufacturer and grandson of a silk mill owner. After graduating from high school, he went to work for an uncle who owned several auto supply stores. Gallen ran his own store before serving in the army, where he was still involved in the auto parts business during World War II. Because of wartime restrictions, fabric became difficult to acquire and he recognized a chance to take advantage of connections to move into the apparel industry.

In 1949, he founded Ellen Tracy, manufacturing women's blouses in New York and selling them for $28.50 a dozen to department stores. Initially, Gallen produced several sample blouses using fabric obtained from a friend, which he then took to major department stores in Manhattan. He visited Franklin Simon & Co., which immediately purchased every blouse he had. The label had a showroom and stockroom on Third Avenue.

Gallen made up the name "Ellen Tracy" because he believed that a women's clothing line should feature a woman's name.<

Gallen married Betty Barr who died in 1998. Gallen subsequently married Linda Allard in 2000. Allard had been working for Gallen since 1962 and she later became the creative force behind Ellen Tracy.
