= Linda Allard =

American fashion designer

- Born: 1940 or 1941 (age 85–86); Doylestown, Ohio
- Education: Kent State University
- Occupation: Fashion designer
- Years active: 1962–2002
- Spouse: Herbert Gallen (m. 2000–2007)

Linda Allard (born 1940 or 1941) is an American fashion designer, best known as the chief designer for women's wear label, Ellen Tracy.

Allard was born in Doylestown, Ohio, in 1940 or 1941 to Carroll and Zella Allard. She studied art, as Kent State University did not have a fashion program, but her professor Mel Someroski created opportunities for her to develop a fashion portfolio, and helped her stage the university's first fashion show. She graduated in 1962.

Upon graduation, she quickly found work in New York when Herbert Gallen hired her as an assistant designer for his clothing line, Ellen Tracy. She worked as an assistant for about two years before being promoted to chief designer in 1964. In 1983 her name was added to the company's brand: "Linda Allard for Ellen Tracy".

In 2000 Allard married her boss, Gallen, and they remained together until his death in 2007. In 2002 she retired from the company when the brand was sold to Liz Claiborne, Inc.
