= Samuel Colcord Bartlett =

American academic administrator (1817–1898)

The Reverend Samuel Colcord Bartlett
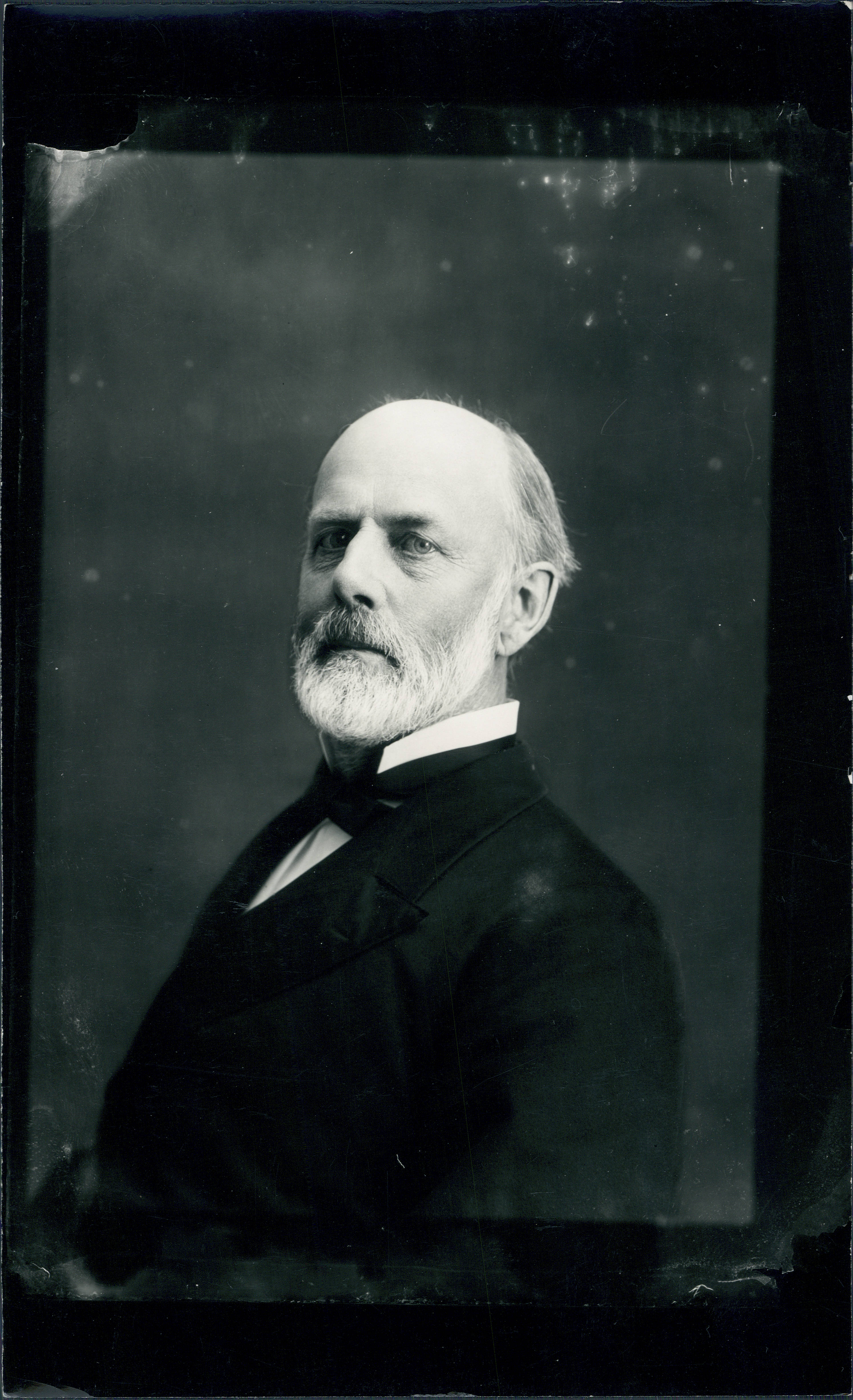

8th President of Dartmouth College
- In office 1877–1892
- Preceded by: Asa Dodge Smith
- Succeeded by: William Jewett Tucker

Personal details
- Born: November 25, 1817 Salisbury, New Hampshire
- Died: November 16, 1898 (aged 80) Hanover, New Hampshire

Samuel Colcord Bartlett (November 25, 1817 – November 16, 1898) was an American Congregational minister who served as the 8th president of Dartmouth College from 1877–1892. He graduated from Dartmouth with the Class of 1836.

== Biography ==
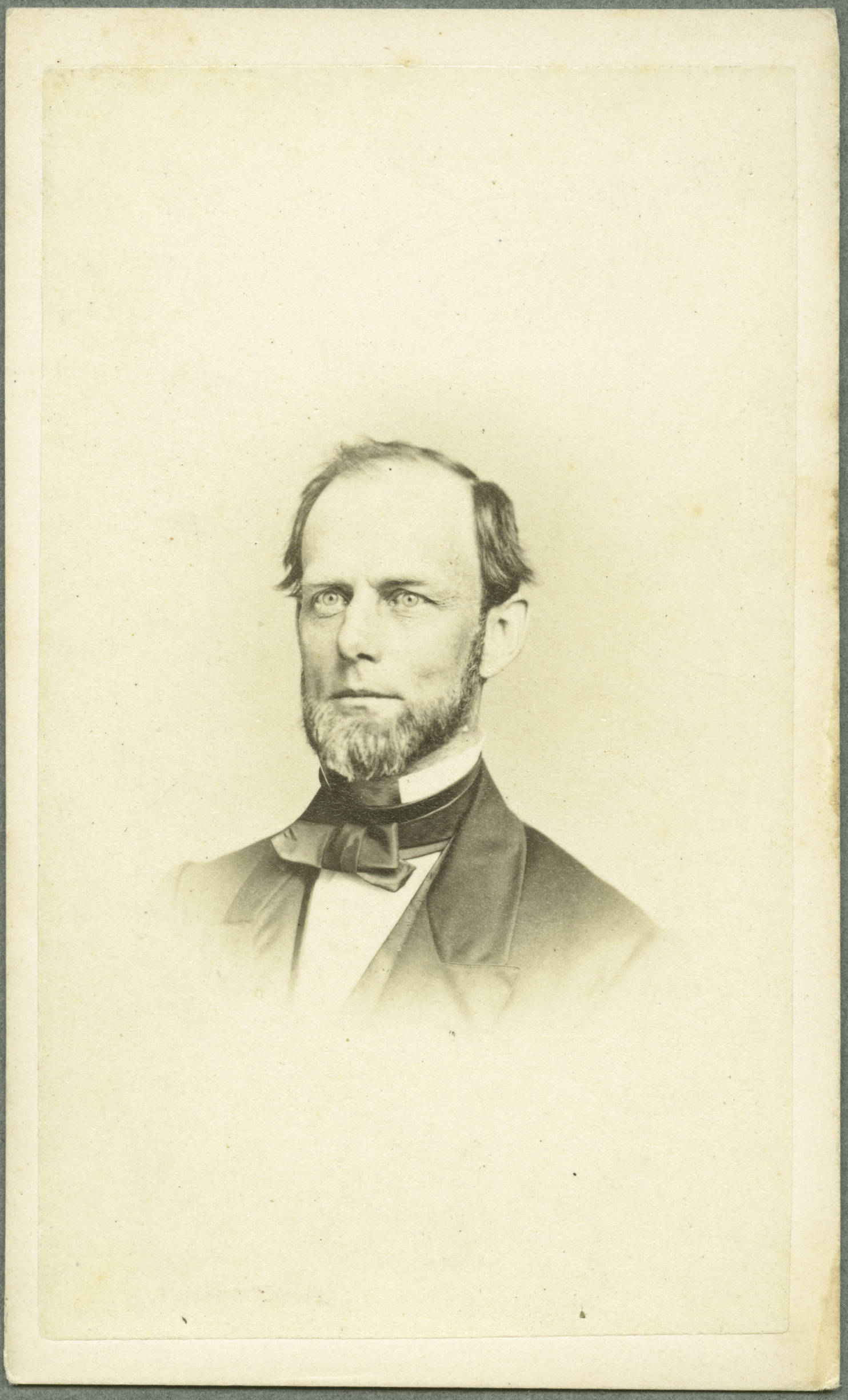
Barlett's daguerreotype by Alexander Hesler

Another period of growth for Dartmouth College marked the tenure of President Bartlett, with the building of Rollins Chapel, Bartlett Hall and Wilson Hall. An elective course for students took shape during his administration and the endowment surpassed the million-dollar mark. Bartlett improved working conditions for faculty members and added 30 more scholarships to what had been an already growing list during the tenure of President Lord.

But the administration of President Bartlett was an embattled one, and he lost the vital support of faculty and alumni alike. The controversy surrounding him reached an apogee when the majority of the graduating Class of 1881 called for his removal from office. Subjected to an investigation by the Trustees, Bartlett employed what had become a legendary wit and finely honed intelligence to explain his actions and defend his administration. As a result, the charges—that he had alienated the faculty, ignored important administrative duties and generally conducted himself in a way unbecoming a Dartmouth president--"melted away," in the words of one chronicler. President Bartlett remained in office until 1892, when he resigned to become a member of the faculty.

== Works ==
- Samuel C. Bartlett, 1850, The Moral Relations of Physical Science
- Samuel C. Bartlett, 1856, Lectures on Modern Universalism
- Samuel C. Bartlett, D.D. 1866. "Life and Death Eternal: A Refutation of the Theory of Annihilation" (PDF). Archived from the original (PDF) on 2011-07-24.
- Samuel C. Bartlett, 1872, The Divine Forces of the Gospel: A Sermon ...
- Samuel C. Bartlett, 1875, Future Punishment
- Samuel C. Bartlett, 1879, From Egypt to Palestine: through Sinai, the wilderness and the south country
- Samuel C. Bartlett, 1880, The Princeton Review, pp.23-56, The Inspiration of the New Testament
- Samuel C. Bartlett, 1882, Sources of history in the Pentateuch : six lectures delivered in Princeton theological seminary, on the Stone foundation
- Samuel C. Bartlett, 1897, The Veracity of the Hexateuch
