= List of presidents of Dartmouth College =

Heads of Dartmouth College

President of Dartmouth College
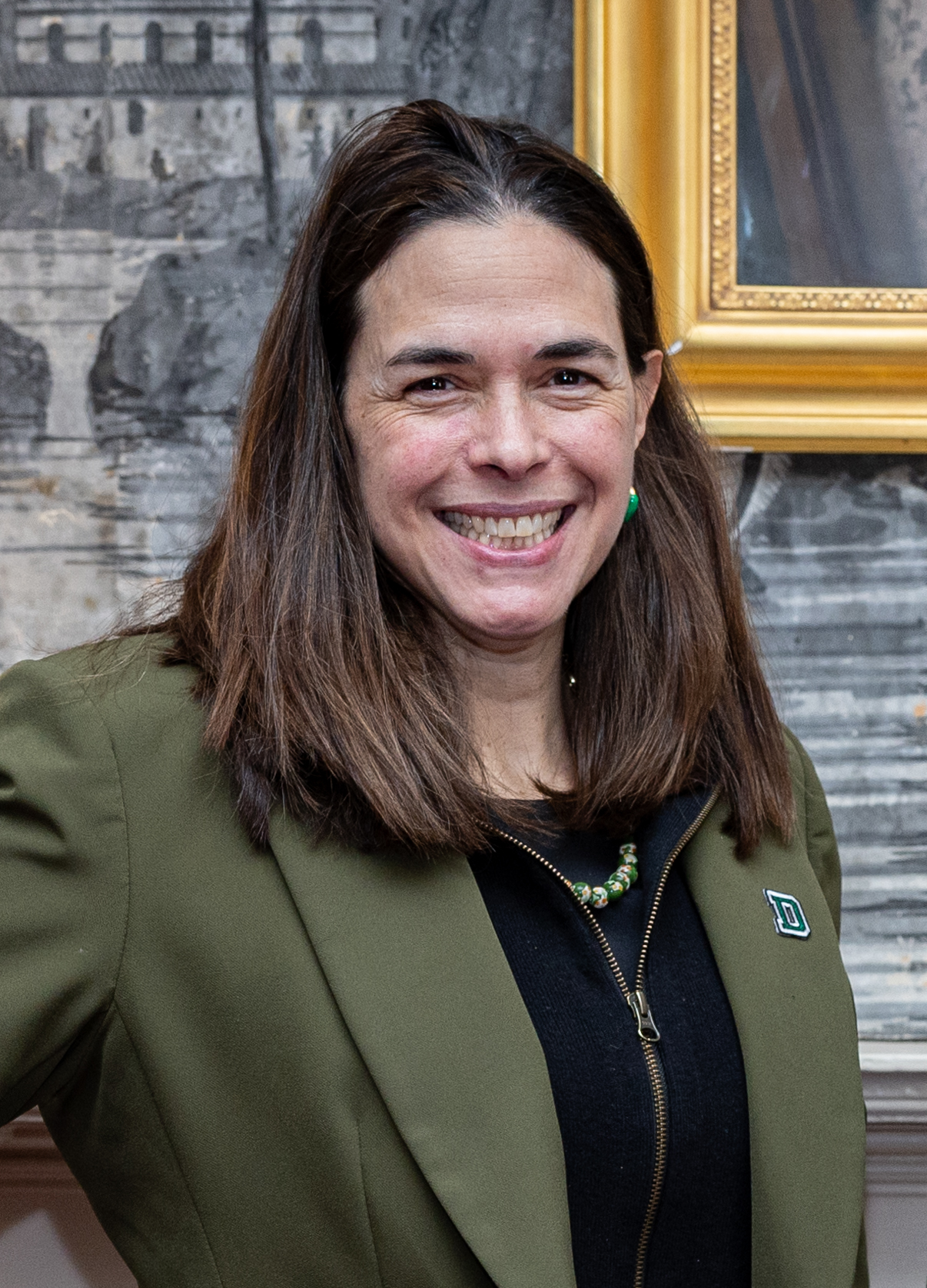
- Incumbent; Sian Beilock since June 12, 2023
- Appointer: Board of Trustees
- Term length: No term limit
- Inaugural holder: Eleazar Wheelock
- Formation: December 13, 1769 (256 years ago)
- Website: president.dartmouth.edu

Dartmouth College is a private Ivy League research university in Hanover, New Hampshire, United States. It was founded in 1769 by Eleazar Wheelock, a Yale graduate and Congregational minister, through a royal charter issued by John Wentworth in the name of King George III. The charter created a college for the education of Native Americans and others in the "liberal arts and sciences", connecting it to Wheelock's earlier Charity School. Named for William Legge, 2nd Earl of Dartmouth, the institution is the ninth oldest college in the United States and the last founded under colonial rule.

The president of Dartmouth College is the institution's chief executive officer and chief adviser to the Board of Trustees. Under the Board's bylaws, the president has "general charge and control of the College and its affairs," including the organization of the faculties; responsibility for the conduct of educational and administrative operations and internal discipline; authority to execute instruments on the college's behalf; and the power to appoint and remove officers and administrators consistent with Board policies. The president serves as a trustee ex officio and is a voting member of the Board's executive committee, and an ex officio non-voting member of its other standing committees, with recusals required when the Board considers presidential compensation or performance. In the event of the president's death, absence, or disability, the Board may designate an interim president and define the scope of interim authority.

The college's 1769 charter vests governance in the "Trustees of Dartmouth College", authorizing them to elect officers, grant degrees, and "displace and remove" officers as necessary; in modern practice, degrees approved by the Trustees are conferred by the president at commencement. Dartmouth's status as a private corporation governed by its Board, and the inviolability of its charter, were affirmed by the United States Supreme Court in Dartmouth College v. Woodward (1819).

Since 1769, nineteen individuals have held the office, a line known as the "Wheelock Succession". The current president, Sian Beilock, was elected by the Board on July 21, 2022, took office on June 12, and was inaugurated on September 22, 2023, becoming the first woman to lead Dartmouth.

== Presidents ==
The following persons have served as president of Dartmouth College:

Presidents
No.	Image	Name	Class	Term start	Term end	Ref.
1	Portrait of Eleazar Wheelock in 18th-century attire sitting in a room with books in the background.	Eleazar Wheelock (Note: President and founder of Dartmouth College)	–	1769	1779	
2	Portrait of John Wheelock in 18th-century attire, wearing a white wig and a brown coat over a buttoned waistcoat.	John Wheelock	1771	1779	1815	
3	Portrait of Francis Brown in 19th-century attire, seated with one arm resting on a chair.	Francis Brown	1805	1815	1820	
4	Black and white portrait of Daniel Dana, with glasses and combed-back hair, wearing a high-collared coat.	Daniel Dana	1788	1820	1821	
5	Daguerreotype of Bennet Tyler seated in an ornate chair beside a table with an open book, with a column in the background.	Bennet Tyler	–	1822	1828	
6	Portrait of Nathan Lord with glasses, wearing a dark coat and white cravat.	Nathan Lord	–	1828	1863	
7	Black and white portrait of Asa Dodge Smith with glasses, wearing a suit and bow tie.	Asa Dodge Smith	1830	1863	1877	
8	Black and white photograph of Samuel Colcord Bartlett with a beard and a bald head, wearing a suit and high-collared shirt.	Samuel Colcord Bartlett	1836	1877	1892	
9	Black and white photograph of William Jewett Tucker with a mustache, wearing a suit and high-collared shirt.	William Jewett Tucker	1861	1893	1909	
10	Black and white photograph of Ernest Fox Nichols from a side view, with short hair, wearing a suit and tie.	Ernest Fox Nichols (Note: Professor of Physics (1898–1903))	–	1909	1916	
11	Black and white photograph of Ernest Martin Hopkins with short hair, wearing a suit, tie, and collared shirt.	Ernest Martin Hopkins	1901	1916	1945	
12	Black and white photograph of John Dickey in a suit seated at a desk, writing on papers, with office furniture and a window in the background.	John Sloan Dickey	1929	1945	1970	
13		John George Kemeny (Note: Professor of Mathematics)	–	1970	1981	
14		David T. McLaughlin (Note: Member of the Board of Trustees)	1954	1981	1987	
15		James O. Freedman	–	1987	1998	
16		James Wright (Note: Dean of the Faculty; Professor of History)	–	1998	June 30, 2009	
17	Photograph of Jim Yong Kim in a suit and patterned green tie, wearing glasses and smiling.	Jim Yong Kim (Note: Department of Anthropology faculty)	–	July 1, 2009	June 30, 2012 (Note: Resigned to lead the World Bank.)	
acting		Carol Folt	–	July 1, 2012	June 30, 2013	
18	Photograph of Phillip J. Hanlon in a suit and red tie, wearing glasses and speaking at a microphone.	Philip J. Hanlon (Note: Lewis Professor of Mathematics)	1977	July 1, 2013	June 11, 2023	
19	Photograph of Sian Beilock wearing a green jacket and smiling.	Sian Beilock	–	June 12, 2023	present	
