= William D. Gibbs =

College president

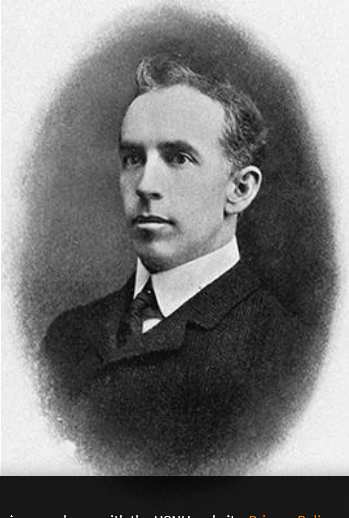

2nd President of New Hampshire College
- In office 1907–1912
- Preceded by: Charles S. Murkland
- Succeeded by: Edward Thomson Fairchild

Personal details
- Born: March 15, 1869 Winchester, Illinois
- Died: December 6, 1944 (aged 75) Wisconsin

William David Gibbs (March 15, 1869 - December 6, 1944) was the second elected President of the New Hampshire College of Agriculture and the Mechanic Arts from 1907-1912, in Durham, New Hampshire, United States, which in 1923 became the University of New Hampshire. During his presidency student numbers tripled to 315, and the number of college buildings reached 15. He believed that students' time should be divided equally between cultural studies, pure science, and vocational studies.

He was born in Winchester, Illinois.

In 1912 there was a student strike 2–6 May after Gibbs suspended a student, William Henry Langdon Brackett, for setting off a false fire alarm. The suspension was overturned by the Board of Trustees. Gibbs resigned later that year, stating in his 1 July letter of resignation that "Business opportunities which particularly appeal to me have influenced me to my decision, although I regret to sever associations which have brought to me much pleasure."

Gibbs died in Wisconsin on December 6, 1944

The University of New Hampshire built a residence hall named Gibbs Hall in his honor, it was dedicated on June 14, 1947.
