= Bennet Tyler =

President of Dartmouth College

The Reverend Bennet Tyler
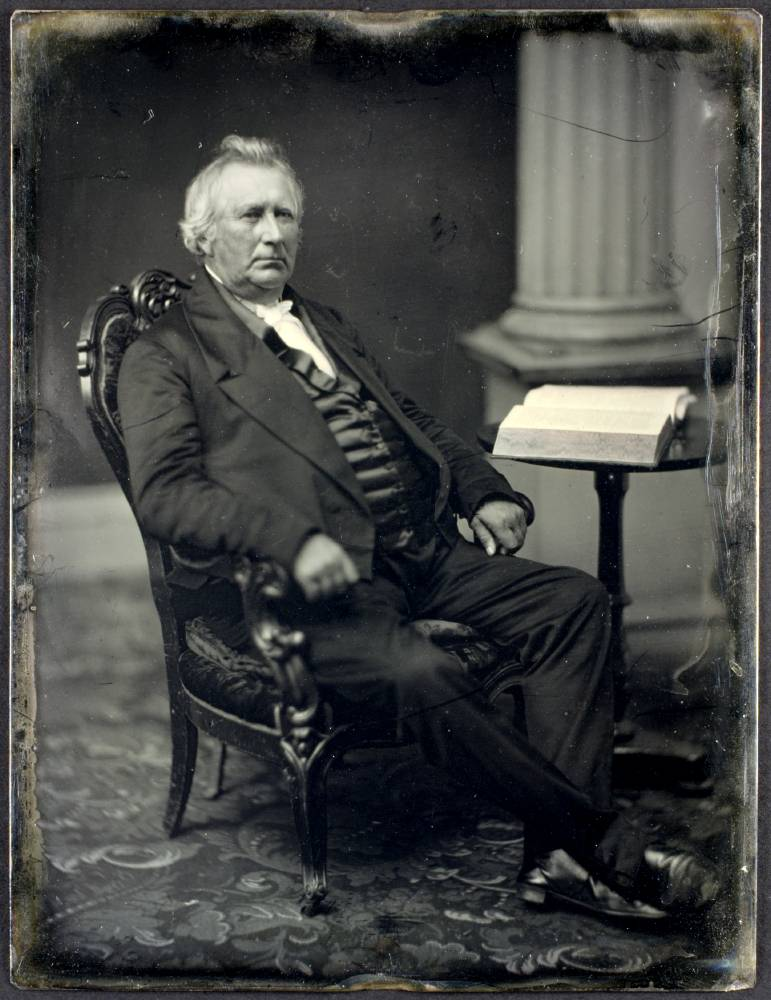

5th President of Dartmouth College
- In office 1822–1828
- Preceded by: Daniel Dana
- Succeeded by: Nathan Lord

Personal details
- Born: July 10, 1783 Middlebury, Connecticut
- Died: May 14, 1858 (aged 74) South Windsor, Connecticut

Bennet Tyler (July 10, 1783 – May 14, 1858) was an American Congregational clergyman and educator. He served as president of Dartmouth College between 1822 and 1828. His Reformed theology was called "Tylerism", as opposed to the post-Reformed Taylorism of Nathaniel William Taylor.

== Biography ==
To succeed President Daniel Dana, Dartmouth Trustees selected Bennet Tyler, a South Britain, Connecticut, minister and graduate of Yale. Tyler was very devout, and he was especially interested in preaching in the College church, letting others do the teaching. He was successful in endowing the first scholarship at Dartmouth, intended for "the education of pious, indigent young men for the ministry". He also stabilized the enrollment, which had plummeted during the Revolutionary War.

It was in 1824, during President Tyler's administration, that Dartmouth admitted its first African-American student, Edward Mitchell, in 1824.

Tyler returned to the ministry after six years as Dartmouth President. He was a founder, theology professor, and president of the Theological Institute of Connecticut, now Hartford Seminary, from 1834 to 1857.
