= Lower Roxbury Historic District =

Historic district in Massachusetts, US

- U.S. National Register of Historic Places
- U.S. Historic district
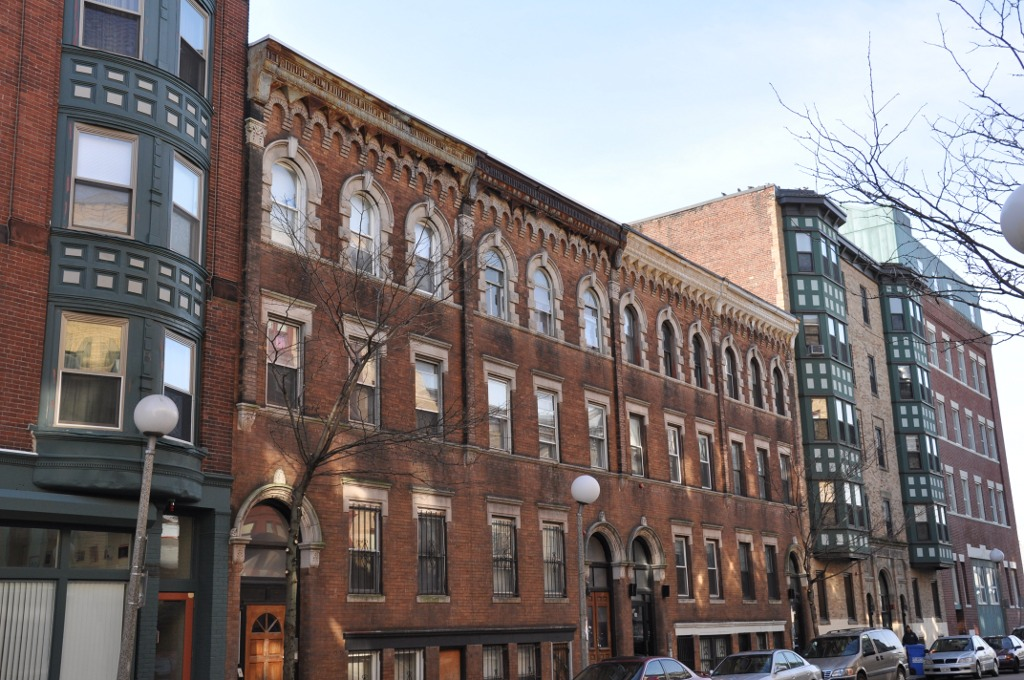
- Coventry Street

- Location within Massachusetts Location within the United States
- Location: Boston, Massachusetts
- Coordinates: 42°20′11″N 71°5′12″W
- Architect: Multiple
- Architectural style: Renaissance, Classical Revival, Late Gothic Revival
- NRHP reference No.: 94001494
- Added to NRHP: December 9, 1994

The Lower Roxbury Historic District is a historic district encompassing an isolated pocket of 1890s mixed residential-commercial property in the lower Roxbury neighborhood of Boston, Massachusetts. Bounded by Tremont, Columbus, and Burke Streets and St. Cyprian's Place, the area contains a well-kept collection of architect designed buildings that survived late 20th-century urban redevelopment. The district was added to the National Register of Historic Places in 1994.

== Description and history ==
The district is bounded on the north by Columbus Avenue and on the south by Tremont Street, and is about 3 acres (1.2 ha) in size. Its western extent is the west side of St. Cyprian's Place (aka Walpole Street), and its eastern extent is roughly Burke Street. All of the buildings east of Coventry Street that were originally included in the district have since been demolished, and the entire block between Coventry and Burke has been redeveloped. Buildings fronting the east side of Coventry Street have also been demolished.

Boston's Roxbury neighborhood was originally a separate community, separated from Boston by the narrow Boston Neck. In the 19th century, a number of land reclamation projects widened the neck and filled in the Back Bay, creating new land for development. Roxbury was annexed to Boston in 1868. The Lower Roxbury area was located south of the Boston and Providence Railroad tracks, and had pockets of marshy land whose development was delayed into the late 19th century. This historic district was built up in one of these areas, between the railroad tracks and Tremont Street, one of the roads extended along the widened neck. By the 1890s, the area between Ruggles Street and Massachusetts Avenue was lined with predominantly wood frame structures and one factory. This area was on the fringes of the urban center, where fire codes required brick construction. When the area was redeveloped in the 1890s, a series of architect-designed buildings were constructed.

The oldest buildings in the district date to the 1850s, but most were built in the 1890s. One notable later building is St. Cyprian's Church (1915–38), which is the only religious building in the district, and its only Gothic Revival structure. Most buildings have Classical Revival inspiration in their detailing, are between three and four stories in height, and many have pressed metal cornices and metal trim detailing. The only entirely commercial building in the district at the time of its listing, 1065-69 Tremont Street, has been demolished.

== See also ==
- National Register of Historic Places listings in southern Boston, Massachusetts
