= Asa Dodge Smith =

Preacher and Dartmouth College president

The Reverend Asa Dodge Smith
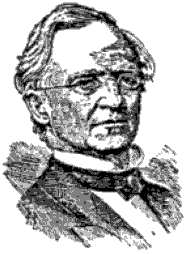

7th President of Dartmouth College
- In office 1863–1877
- Preceded by: Nathan Lord
- Succeeded by: Samuel Colcord Bartlett

1st Non-elected President of New Hampshire College
- In office 1866–1877
- Succeeded by: Charles S. Murkland

Personal details
- Born: September 21, 1804 Amherst, New Hampshire
- Died: August 16, 1877 (aged 75) Hanover, New Hampshire
- Spouse: Sarah Ann Adams
- Children: 7
- Education: Dartmouth College; Andover Theological Seminary

Asa Dodge Smith (September 21, 1804 – August 16, 1877) was an American Presbyterian preacher who served as the 7th president of Dartmouth College from 1863 until his death in 1877.

== Dartmouth Presidency ==
After the forced resignation of Nathan Lord in 1863 over his support for slavery, the Trustees wanted a more conservative president to take his place. As a preacher for 29 years at the 14th Street Presbyterian Church in New York City, Asa Dodge had developed a reputation as a religious man with abolitionist beliefs.

Smith's presidency was a period of great growth for the College, including the establishment of two new schools within Dartmouth. The New Hampshire College of Agriculture and the Mechanic Arts, later moved to Durham, New Hampshire and renamed the University of New Hampshire, was founded in Hanover in 1866. One year later, the Thayer School of Engineering was founded. Over the course of his presidency, enrollment at the College was more than doubled, the number of scholarships increased from 42 to 103, and Dartmouth benefited from several important bequests. Both schools grew during his dual Presidency.

== Personal life ==
Smith graduated from Dartmouth in 1830. Then he went on to graduate from the Andover Theological Seminary in 1834. He married Sarah Ann Adams and the two had seven children.

== Legacy ==
Asa Dodge's son William Thayer Smith (1839–1909) served as Dean of the Medical School from 1896 until his death in 1909 and was the first dean to give the name "Dartmouth Medical School" to the organization which had until then never had a consistent name. He was also the first person to perform a surgery in the Mary Hitchcock Memorial Hospital. He was a Dartmouth Medical School class of 1879 and received an honorary LL.D. from Dartmouth in 1897.

== See also ==
- Wheelock Succession
