= Ellen Tracy =

American fashion label

- Founded: 1949 in New York
- Key people: Herbert Gallen (founder); Linda Allard (chief designer)
- Website: ellentracy.com

Ellen Tracy is an American company selling women's apparel, cosmetics, perfume, and decor. It was founded as a clothing manufacturing company by Herbert Gallen in 1949.

Previous to Ellen Tracy's cosmetic line, the brand partnered with Revlon to produce an Ellen Tracy perfume.

In 1962, Gallen hired recent college graduate Linda Allard as his design assistant and within two years, she was named Director of Design. She remained with the company for more than 30 years. The company was acquired in 2002 by Liz Claiborne, Inc. and became a wholly owned subsidiary of that company. Ellen Tracy was acquired by Sequential Brands, who sold the company to GMA Group in 2021.
