= South End House =

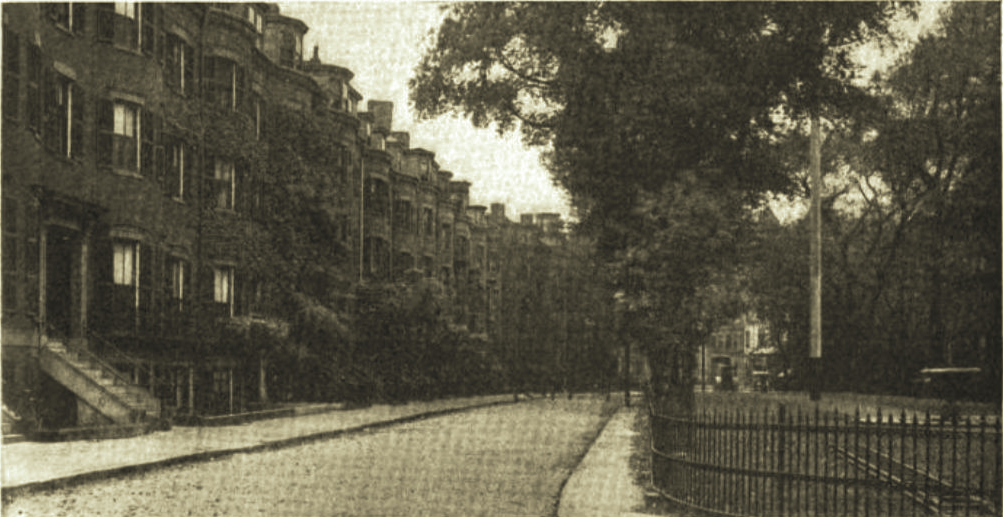
Union Park, with South End House near the center of the row on the left (1917)

South End House is a settlement house in South End, Boston, Massachusetts. It stressed education and study, but gradually extended its activities until it contributed in a multitude of ways to the life of Boston, particularly to the south End neighborhood. The house was controlled by a council of which William Jewett Tucker was the chairman; but the active work was carried on by a number of resident members.

Established in 1892, and incorporated in 1897, South End House was Boston's first settlement house and the fourth in the country. Decades later, South End House and four other properties became an association, the United South End Settlements.

== Organizational history ==
=== Forerunner ===
The Andover House commenced its work in January 1892 as a social experiment, without traditions, or experience, and with little help from example.

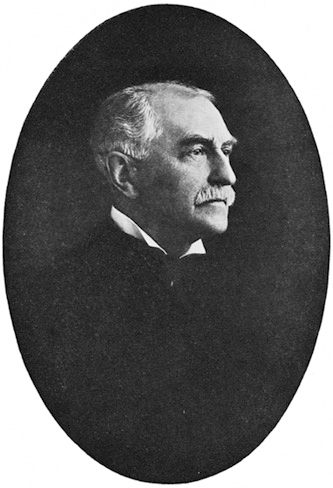
William J. Tucker

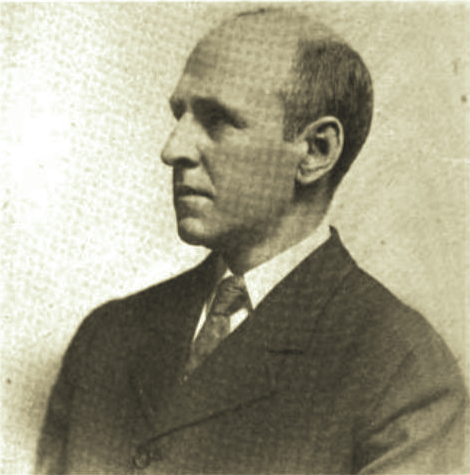
Robert A. Woods

The movement for the Andover House began among a group of the younger graduates of Andover Theological Seminary, including Robert Archey Woods, who started the House, and was thereafter head of it. They got their inspiration from Professor William Jewett Tucker, afterwards president of Dartmouth College. Tucker encouraged Woods' desire for social service.The only pattern which Tucker and Woods had before them was Toynbee Hall. To London, accordingly, went Woods, and spent six months studying the methods of Toynbee Hall, under the direction of Canon Barnett. Canon Barnett's undertaking had at the heart of it two determining ideas. He desired to make the privileged of service to the unprivileged; to gather about him in the East End of London a group of men who should come from Oxford or Cambridge, as Arnold Toynbee had come, and share the rich happiness of their intellectual and social life with those from whom much of this joy had been barred by arbitrary and accidental environment. He desired also that this should be done in the spirit of the Christian religion, though the house had no formal connection with the church. It was understood to be an opportunity for the energies of some who, for various reasons, could not work under the conditions of the usual parochial societies. But the spirit of the founder was distinctively Christian. Jane Addams described it as "a bent to express in social service and in terms of action the spirit of Christ." These two ruling ideas Woods had already in his mind when he went to London, and he came away confirmed in them as the method to govern the house. The results of Wood's study he put into a book entitled English Social Movements, and in the light of this experience, the Andover House was opened.

=== Andover House Association ===
Tucker helped in many invaluable ways the establishment of the house -then, and for three years after, called the Andover House- and served as president of the Andover House Association. The Andover House Association, which stood responsible for the work, however, represented from the beginning a large variety of persons having no identity of interest except that in the more progressive lines of social activity.

=== Restructure ===
After three years, the name changed from Andover House to South End House to remove the association with the theological seminary. The House is located at 6 Rollins Street. The location was selected so as to allow the work to reach both ways-toward the richer working people and toward those of laboring classes. In the first instance, the House was the home of a group of educated men, who in one way and another enter actively into all the better interests of the immediate neighborhood. The keynote of every effort was personal friendliness. As far as possible, the attitude of patronage was completely avoided.

Woods never fell into the snare of preparation. He met needs as they came, adapted his program to the changing situation, and freely followed opportunity wherever it led. He believed that the house was for the community, not the community for the house.

At the beginning, the work of the House necessarily had to be somewhat ill-defined. Indeed, the work of a university settlement could never take on the exact and highly organized form of an institution; however, the purpose of making the work regular and continuous was held strongly in mind. The original purpose included not only well-meaning effort, but careful study of actual conditions to accompany and inform such effort. As a rule, each resident visited a certain group of families and made it his duty to become thoroughly acquainted with them. As he learned about the life of the families, not as a canvasser learns, but as a friend learns about a friend, he made out a complete schedule, covering every significant point. Much time was also given to careful investigation of social problems, affecting the life of the city as a whole. In several instances, through such study, residents did useful work in the way of the improvement and development of some of the larger forms of philanthropic work in Boston.

The residents cooperated with the various local agencies in the way of self-help, as well as of charity and philanthropy. They participated in certain local societies of the people's own; they served on a local committee of the associated charities; they acted upon the managing board of different charitable institutions, besides rendering a large amount of irregular service in such causes; they cooperated as far as possible, according to their particular inclination, with the work of the churches in the neighborhood, though they avoided the very appearance of proselytism; and this not merely as a matter of policy, but of principle. It was held to be very important to do everything through cooperation with existing agencies that could be done in that way.

The House was not meant to be an institution foisted upon the neighborhood, but simply an influence which would act in support and confirmation of such good influences as were already in action; thus, the House undertook very little formal educational work, because the educational system of Boston, including evening elementary schools and the evening high school, so well filled the need in that particular.

In the larger social field, Woods and Mr. Kennedy edited for the National Federation of Settlements a book on Young Working Girls, a summary of evidence from 2,000 workers; and under the Russell Sage Foundation A Handbook of Settlements in the United States.

== Aims ==
- "The house is designed to stand for the single idea of resident study and work in the neighborhood where it may be located. . . . The whole aim and motive is religious, but the method is educational rather than evangelistic. A second, though hardly secondary, object . . . . will be to create a center, for those within reach, of social study, discussion, and organization."-Circular No. 1, October 9, 1891.
- "The house aims to bring about a better and more beautiful life in its neighborhood and district and to develop new ways (through study and action in this locality) of meeting some of the serious problems of society."—1896.
- "To foster and sustain the home under tenement conditions; to rehabilitate neighborhood life and give it some of that healthy corporate vitality which a well-ordered village has; to undertake objective investigations of local conditions; to aid organized labor both in the way of inculcating higher aims and in the way of supporting its just demands; to furnish a neutral ground where separated classes, rich and poor, professional and industrial, capitalist and wageearner, may meet each other on the basis of common humanity; to initiate local co-operation for substantial good purposes; to strive for a better type of local politics, and to take part in municipal affairs as they affect the district; to secure for the district its full share of all the best fruits of the city's intellectual and moral progress; and to lead people throughout the city to join in this aim and motive."-Woods, Robert A.: The City Wilderness, p. 274. 1898.
- "Its aim is to work directly in one neighborhood, indirectly through the city as a whole, for the organic fulfillment of all the responsibilities, whether written down or implied, for the well being of the community, that attach to the citizen in a republic."-February 5, 1904.

== Efforts for district improvement ==
1. Housing.-Assisted in several studies of housing conditions; represented in the directorate of a model buildings company; presented testimony before various commissions; and had a part in securing the present adequate law. By detailed study of its neighborhood and co-operation with the city departments, has been able to assist in the enforcement of the building code.
2. Streets and sanitation.-Improved the sanitary service of the district by acting as a center to receive complaints; and by initiating and co-operating with neighborhood clubs and district improvement associations.
3. Play Spaces.-Co-operated with the various city-wide endeavors for parks and playgrounds, and helped to secure the present Ward Nine playground. Endeavors to secure the adequate use of the playground by providing direction for groups of children and young people. Has maintained vacant lot playgrounds.
4. Public school and education.-Co-operates with neighborhood public schools through visitation, meetings with teachers, conferences, work for backward children, etc. A resident acts as home and school visitor. The head resident has long interested himself in the development of the idea of industrial education, pointing out the present waste of years between fourteen and sixteen in the case of working children, and served in 1906 as temporary secretary of the state commission on industrial education. Through the publicity given to the Franklin Fund, helped save the fund to its present use in the Franklin Union.
5. Labor.-Residents early established acquaintance with trade union leaders, and the head of the house acted as treasurer of the relief committee of the Central Labor Union in 1893–4. The unions co-operated with the settlement in securing the Dover Street bath house; in organizing several series of conferences on labor matters; and in efforts for arbitrating strikes. Secures a union of forces between agencies for general social betterment and the trade unions in matters before the city government and the state legislature. Rendered valuable service in bringing about the complete change of front on the part of the labor unions toward industrial education. Several studies of women's work have been made, and aid has been given in organizing several women's unions and the Women's Trade Union League. An investigation into the work of children leaving school was in part responsible for the present law providing for the licensing of boys engaged in street trades by the school board.
6. Political and civic.-The head resident has served actively for many years as a member of the Public Franchise League, which secured the municipal ownership of Boston's subways; and for ten years was a member of the Municipal Bath Commission. The settlement co-operates with the better grade of politicians in the neighborhood and district leaders are stimulated to secure public improvements. Out of its studies into political machinery came the bill by which aldermen were elected at large, and residents took an active part in the campaigns of 1905-6 and 1909–10 on issues which transcended party lines. Residents have always worked for the candidates of the Public School Association.
7. Economic.-Active in the relief work of the crisis of 1893–4. A club of business men was organized which opened two restaurants; made an investigation into unemployment; hastened a state appropriation for the employment of labor; and a state commission on unemployment. Acted as a center for distribution in the coal strike of 1902. From time to time served as a center for the sale of coal in small lots, and for two years maintained a restaurant and counter for the sale of cooked food. A lace making experiment conducted for several years later became an independent enterprise. Conducts the largest stamp savings center in New England.
8. Legislation. The head resident has strongly urged and earnestly striven for the gradual segregation from the community of its degenerate and degraded types. An active part has been taken in securing the Massachusetts legislation against the tramp evil; Mr. Woods was appointed chairman of the board of trustees of the State Hospital for Dipsomaniacs (1907), and had a part in securing the passage of a bill (1910) to separate licenses for the sale of liquor for consumption at a bar from licenses for the sale by bottles or cans for home consumption; the number of licenses also being greatly reduced.
9. Moral.-Constant watchfulness as to the standing of the saloons, etc. of the quarter. Has been able from time to time to influence the city departments to action. Much work for the moral rescue of individuals has been undertaken. In co-operation with various city societies residents have contributed to the total effort for a better standard of social morality. Active in the campaign which secured the juvenile court, and co-operates with its officers in various ways.
10. Health.-A pioneer in the anti-tuberculosis campaign in the city; maintained for some years a dispensary for the sale of milk for infants (now independent); maintains a resident nursing service; and substantially assisted the Boston Dispensary in initiating its medical-social work. It has been a factor in providing several notable exhibits, particularly the dental exhibit (1908).
11. Awakening local initiative.-Neighborhood committee organized (1905) to co-operate in efforts for district betterment; Club Council, 1909; Neighborhood Association, 1910. Residents have had a leading part in initiating and carrying on the work of the South End Improvement Association (1908), with 700 paying local members.
12. Artistic.-Picture exhibits, yearly courses of lectures, concerts, etc. Some activities have been turned over to city and private organizations.

== Locations ==
The money with which to buy, build and maintain the holdings of the South End House was gathered either by the personal work of Woods, or by reason of confidence in him. The plant included:

- Headquarters: Men's Residence and Housekeeping Apartments, 20-22 Union Park (1901-, 1909-)
- Women's Residence, 43-45 East Canton Street (1900-, 1906-)
- South Bay Union, Neighborhood Town Hall, 636-640 Harrison Avenue (1903-)
- Room Registry and Boarding Club, 171 W. Brookline Street (1907-)
- Residence Head of the House, 16 Bond Street (1902-)
- South End Music School (Affiliated), 19 Pembroke Street (1910–)
- Summer Homes: Children, Winning Farm, Lexington, Massachusetts; Older Boys, Bretton Inn Caddy Colony, Bretton Woods, New Hampshire; Young Women, Camp Content, Little Sebago Lake, Maine

Former locations included:

- Headquarters: 6 Rollins St., November, 1891–1901
- Club and Class Center, 611 Harrison Ave., 1895–1903
- Center for Work among Negroes: 33 Bradford St., 1902–1905
- 478 Shawmut Ave., 1905–1907
- 18 Northampton St., 1907; Became Robert G. Shaw House (independent), 1908
- Room Registry and Boarding Club: 34 Rutland Sq., 1905–1907

== Activities ==
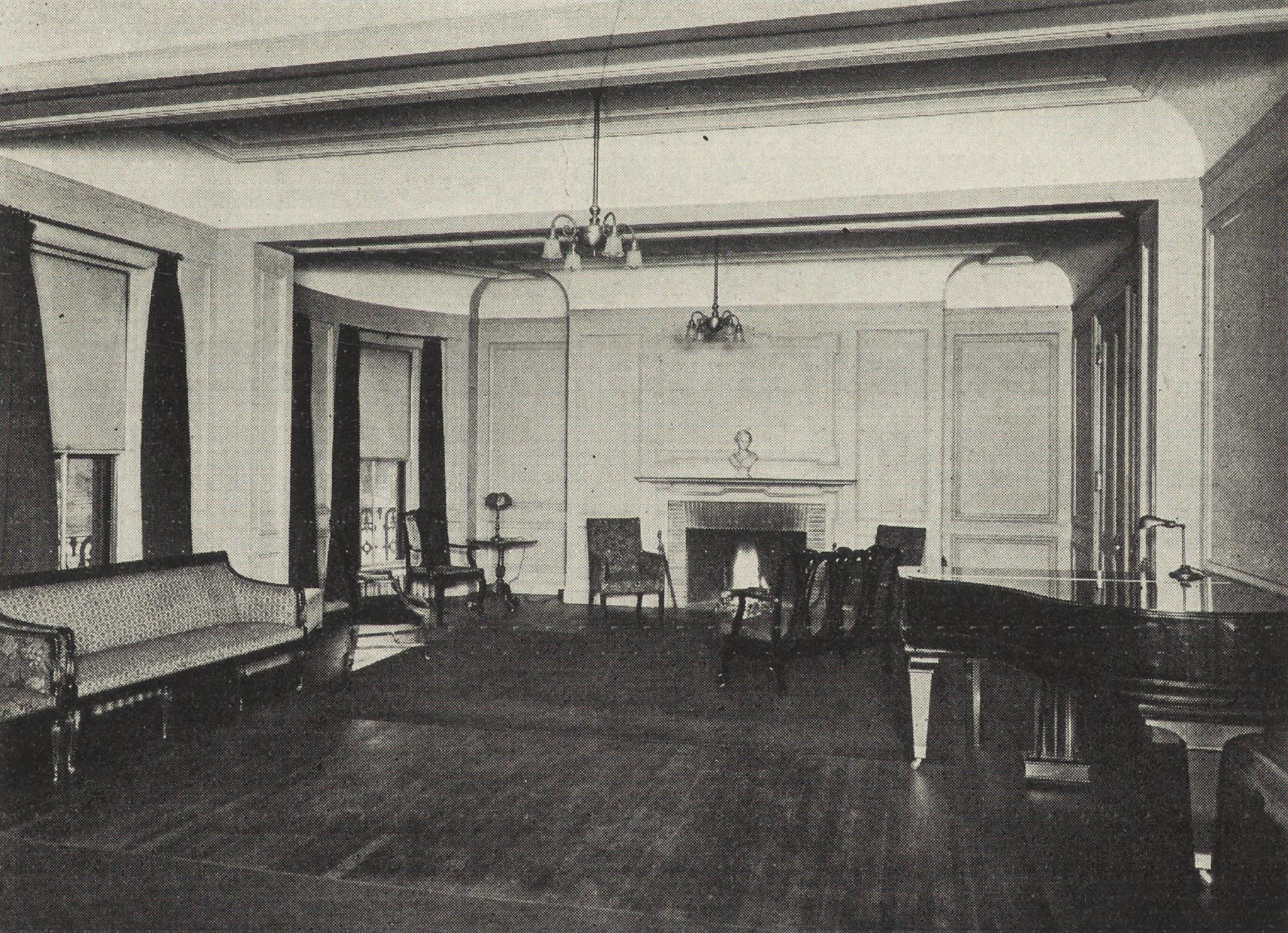
Assembly room in the South End House (June 1919)

The gatherings at the House, while they were by regular appointment, were very informal in their nature, beginning with recreation of various kinds, and leading always toward the mental and moral improvement of those who came. There were clubs for boys and girls, for little children, for young men and young women, and there was a weekly meeting for mothers of the neighborhood. But in all these, the numbers were small, and the effort was constantly to have the influence of a personal rather than a mechanical one. In connection with this work, much aid was given by persons from other parts of Boston, both men and women.

There was instruction in nursing, housekeeping, cooking, playacting, sloyd, basketry, millinery, dressmaking, lacemaking carpentry, printing. There was collection of stamp savings, probation work in the juvenile court, a room registry of approved houses, a music school, and close cooperation with a district conference of the Associated Charities. An association of caddies gathered from the neighborhood were sent every summer, under direction, to the hotels in the neighborhood of the White Mountains. Mothers and children were taken into the country. The residents of the House and a number of other persons who were actively interested arranged two Free Art Exhibitions, held by permission, in 1895, in a large hall owned by the city. Each exhibition lasted for four weeks, including Sundays, and was attended by over 40,000 people.

== Records ==
Some of the Andover House Association records are held by Northeastern University. Some of the South End House Association records, for the period of 1909–1944, are held by Simmons University.

== Selected works ==
=== Books ===
- The City Wilderness, A Study of the South End (1898)
- Americans in Process, A Study of the North and West Ends (1902)
- South End Factory Employees
- The Lodging House Problem in Boston
- Part-Time Day and Evening Schools
- In Freedom's Birthplace, a study of the Negro in Boston
- Young Working Girls, a summary of evidence from 2,000 workers
- A Handbook of Settlements in the United States

=== Pamphlets ===
- The Public Charitable Institutions of Boston
- Public Baths in Boston
- Some Slums in Boston
- Ethnic Factors in the Population of Boston
- The Unemployed in Boston
- Boston Evening Schools
- Beggars and Their Lodgings
- Steam Laundries in Boston
- Italian Immigration in Boston

== See also ==
- Settlement and community houses in the United States
