= Edward Thomson Fairchild =

College President (1854–1917)

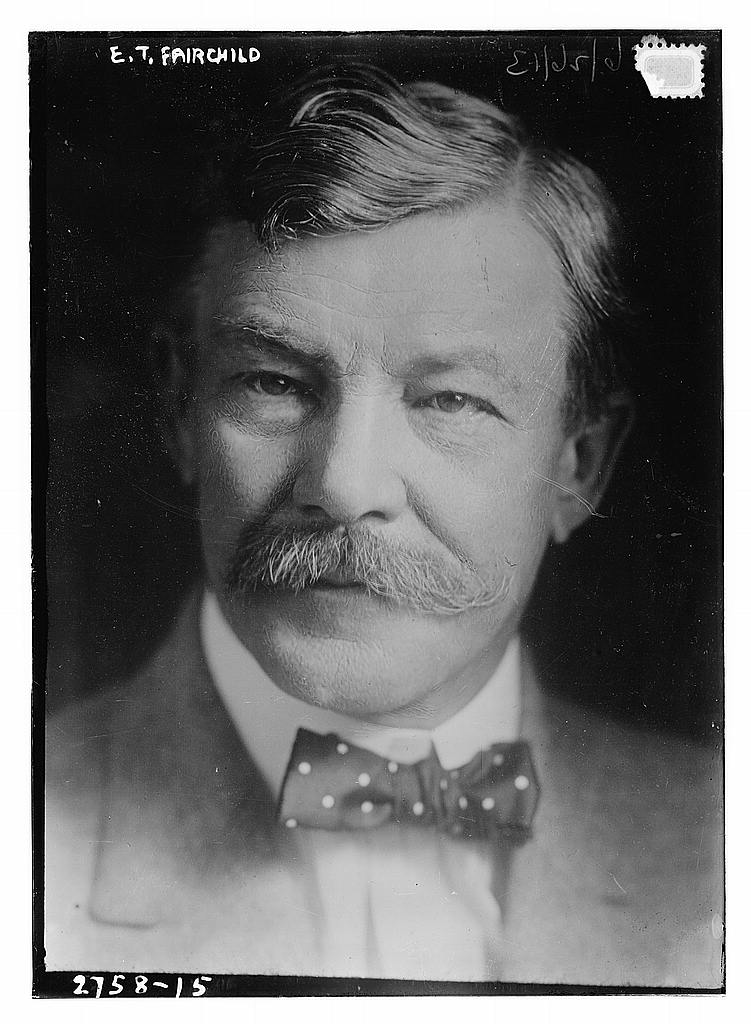

3rd President of New Hampshire College
- In office December 1, 1912 – January 23, 1917
- Preceded by: William D. Gibbs
- Succeeded by: Ralph D. Hetzel

Personal details
- Born: October 30, 1854 Doylestown, Ohio
- Died: January 23, 1917 (aged 62) Durham, New Hampshire

Edward Thomson Fairchild (October 30, 1854 – January 23, 1917) was the third elected President of the New Hampshire College of Agriculture and Mechanical Arts in Durham, New Hampshire from 1912 to January 23, 1917, when he died in office at age 62. Prior to serving as President of New Hampshire College, Fairchild served as Kansas state superintendent of public instruction.

The University of New Hampshire built a residence hall named Fairchild Hall in his honor while still serving a President, it was dedicated on April 12, 1916.
