= Nathan Lord =

American academic administrator

The Reverend Nathan Lord
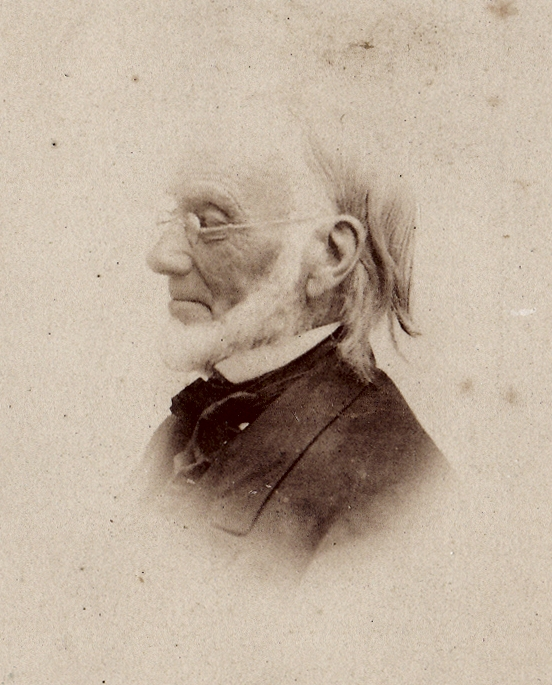

6th President of Dartmouth College
- In office 1828–1863
- Preceded by: Bennet Tyler
- Succeeded by: Asa Dodge Smith

Personal details
- Born: November 28, 1793; Berwick, Maine
- Died: September 9, 1870 (aged 77); Hanover, New Hampshire

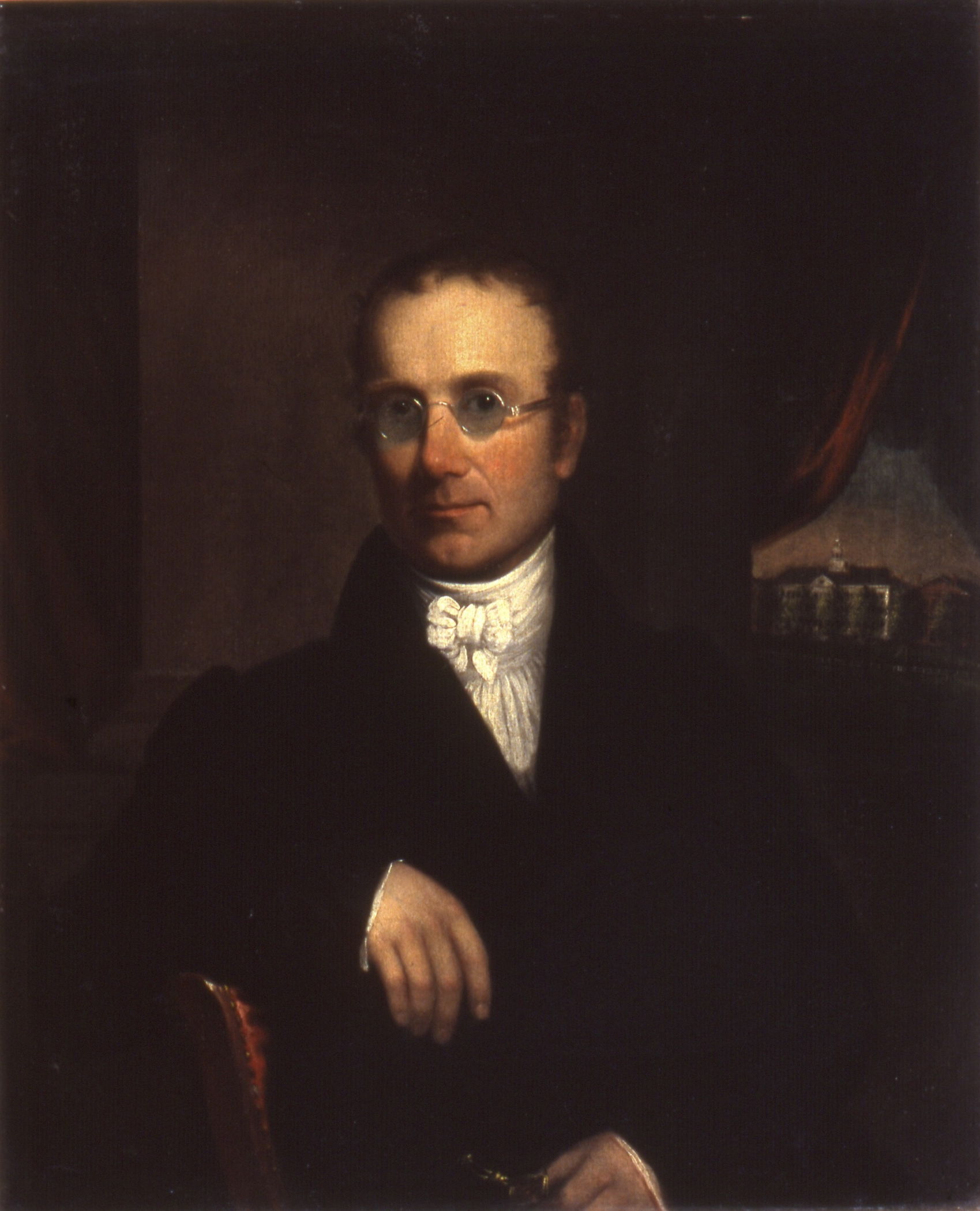
Portrait of Nathan Lord by Joseph Greenleaf Cole, 1830

Nathan Lord (November 28, 1793 – September 9, 1870) was an American Congregational clergyman and educator who served as president of Dartmouth College for more than three decades.

== Biography ==
Nathan Lord was born in Berwick, Maine. He graduated from Bowdoin College in 1809, and attended Andover Theological Seminary, serving afterwards as a pastor at the Congregationalist Church in Amherst, Massachusetts for twelve years.

In 1828 he became the sixth president of Dartmouth College serving in this capacity from 1828 to 1863. Lord brought the college out of debt and made controversial changes to the curriculum. His "non-ambitious system" banned all academic honors and distinctions and enjoyed the support of the Trustees of Dartmouth, but faced significant criticism.

He was a founding member of the American Anti-Slavery Society, and in 1833 served as the Vice President of the New Hampshire delegation to the National Anti-Slavery Convention. He admitted black students to Dartmouth College and was a friend of William Lloyd Garrison. However, after Garrison challenged the Bible on its alleged endorsement of slavery, deeply religious Lord began to question his support of the abolitionist movement and its cause.

His views on slavery changed dramatically by the time he gave a eulogy for John Quincy Adams in 1848. In this address, and in later pamphlets published throughout the 1850s (e.g. A Letter of Inquiry, A True Picture of Abolition), he came to see slavery as "not a moral evil", but as a blessing, "an ordinance of...God", which "providentially found a settlement in this country". These views, and his opposition to the Civil War, which he blamed on abolitionists, brought a storm of controversy, earning him the enmity of several members of the Dartmouth Board of Trustees, including Amos Tuck (1835), a founding member of the Republican Party and close friend of Abraham Lincoln.

Matters came to a head in 1863 when the Trustees were deadlocked on awarding an honorary degree to President Lincoln, and Lord broke the tie by voting against it. The Trustees issued a statement: "Neither the trustees nor the Faculty coincide with the president of the College in the views which he has published, touching slavery and the war; and it has been our hope that the College would not be judged a partisan institution by reason of such publications." Lord, 70, tendered his resignation.

He continued to publish anti-abolitionist materials from his home in Hanover, New Hampshire, until his death in 1870.

== Family ==
He married Elizabeth King Leland (1792–1870) and they had ten children; his youngest son, Nathan Lord Jr., (1831–1885), was a colonel of the 6th Regiment of Vermont Volunteers in the Civil War.
