= Francis Brown (college president) =

President of Dartmouth College

The Reverend Francis Brown
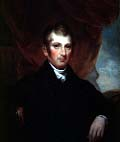

3rd President of Dartmouth College
- In office 1815–1820
- Preceded by: John Wheelock
- Succeeded by: Daniel Dana

Personal details
- Born: January 11, 1784 Chester, New Hampshire
- Died: July 27, 1820 (aged 36) Hanover, New Hampshire

Francis Brown (January 11, 1784 – July 27, 1820) was an American Congregational minister who served as the third president of Dartmouth College. He graduated from the college in 1805 and from 1806 to 1809 held a tutorship there. He also served as a pastor of the Meetinghouse under the Ledge in North Yarmouth, Massachusetts (now Yarmouth, Maine). Brown was removed from his presidency at the college as part of the actions that resulted in the Dartmouth College case, but was reinstated following the 1819 decision in favor of the college.

== Biography ==
Francis Brown was born in Chester, New Hampshire. A pastor from North Yarmouth, Maine, he presided over Dartmouth College during the famous Supreme Court hearing of Trustees of Dartmouth College v. William H. Woodward or, as it is more commonly called, the Dartmouth College Case. The contest was a pivotal one for Dartmouth and for the newly independent nation. It tested the contract clause of the Constitution and arose from an 1816 controversy involving the legislature of the state of New Hampshire, which amended the 1769 charter granted to Eleazar Wheelock, making Dartmouth a public institution and changing its name to Dartmouth University. Under the leadership of President Brown, the Trustees resisted the effort, and the case for Dartmouth was argued by Daniel Webster before the U.S. Supreme Court in 1818.

Chief Justice John Marshall wrote the historic decision in favor of Dartmouth College, thereby paving the way for all American private institutions to conduct their affairs in accordance with their charters and without interference from the state. In a letter following the proceedings, Justice Joseph Story explained "the vital importance to the well-being of society and the security of private rights of the principles on which the decision rested. Unless I am very much mistaken, these principles will be found to apply with an extensive reach to all the great concerns of the people and will check any undue encroachments on civil rights which the passions or the popular doctrines of the day may stimulate our State Legislatures to adopt."

While the outcome was a tremendous victory for Dartmouth, the turmoil of the four-year legal battle left the college in perilous financial condition and took its toll on the health of President Brown. His condition steadily deteriorating, the Trustees made provisions, in 1819, for "the senior professors...to perform all the public duties pertaining to the Office of President of the College" in the event of his disability. Francis Brown died in July 1820 at the age of 36.

== Personal life ==
Brown was the son of Benjamin and Prudence Brown. He married Elizabeth Gilman (1776–1851), the eldest daughter of Tristram Gilman, whom he had succeeded as pastor in North Yarmouth.

== Honors and memberships ==
Elected a member of the American Antiquarian Society in 1813.
