= William Allen (biographer) =

American biographer, scholar and academic

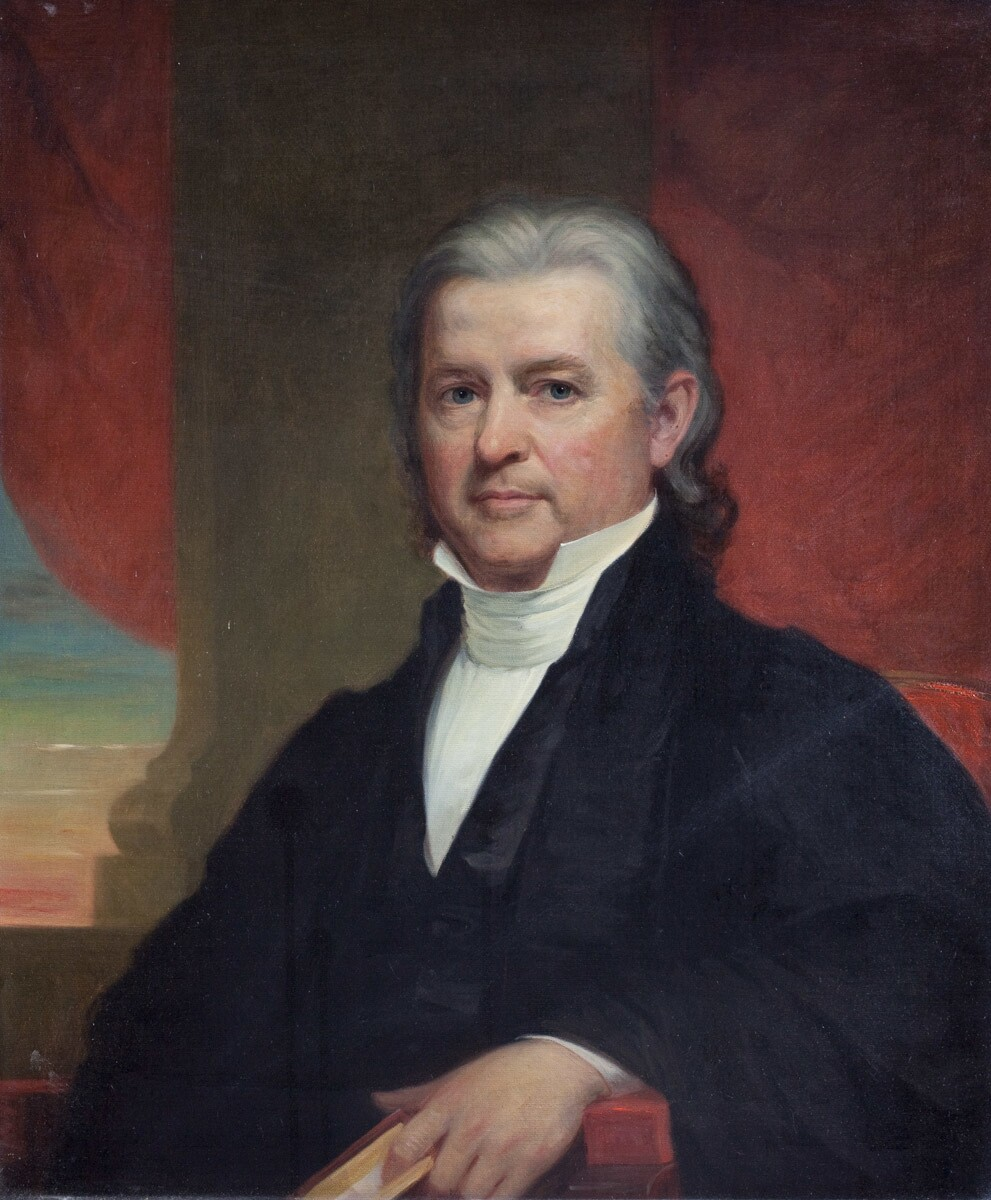

3rd President of Bowdoin College
- In office 1820–1839
- Preceded by: Jesse Appleton
- Succeeded by: Leonard Woods

Personal details
- Born: January 2, 1784 Pittsfield, Massachusetts
- Died: July 16, 1868 (aged 84) Northampton, Massachusetts
- Spouse(s): Maria Malleville Wheelock (1818-1828, her death); Sarah Breed
- Education: Harvard University

William Allen (January 2, 1784 – July 16, 1868) was an American biographer, scholar and academic. He served as president of both Dartmouth University and Bowdoin College.

== Biography ==
William Allen was born at Pittsfield, Massachusetts in 1784. He graduated from Harvard College in Cambridge in 1802 and after a few years of work became assistant librarian at Harvard. He became a pastor in Pittsfield (1810), president of Dartmouth University (1817), and president of Bowdoin College (1820-1839). He was largely responsible for establishing the Medical School of Maine at Bowdoin College in 1820. He resigned in 1839 and died at Northampton in 1868.

He prepared his American Biographical and Historical Dictionary (1809), the first work of general biography published in the United States. In 1810 he succeeded his father as pastor of the church in Pittsfield. Allen was elected a member of the American Antiquarian Society in 1814. He was chosen president of Dartmouth University in 1818 and remained until the Dartmouth College Case extinguished the institution in 1819. In 1820 he went to Bowdoin College, over which institution he presided until 1839, when he resigned and devoted himself to literary studies. He was elected a Fellow of the American Academy of Arts and Sciences in 1823.

He collected 10,000 words not contained in standard dictionaries, and published them as a supplement to Webster's Dictionary. He wrote Junius Unmasked, in which he sought to prove that Lord Sackville was the author of the Junius letters (Boston, 1828); Psalms and Hymns (1835); Memoirs of Dr. Eleazar Wheelock and of Dr. John Codman (1853); A Discourse at the Close of the Second Century of the Settlement at Northampton, Massachusetts (1854); Wunnissoo, or the Vale of Housatonnuck, a poem (Boston, 1856); a Dudleian lecture at Cambridge; a book of Christian Sonnets (Northampton, 1860); Poems of Nazareth and the Cross (1866); Sacred Songs (1867); and numerous pamphlets, and contributed biographical articles to Sprague's Annals of the American Pulpit. See his Life, with Selections from his Correspondence (Philadelphia, 1847).

Preceded by Jesse Appleton	President of Bowdoin College; 1820–39	Succeeded by Leonard Woods
