= Old State House (Hartford, Connecticut) =

Historic building in Connecticut, United States

- Old Statehouse
- U.S. National Register of Historic Places
- U.S. National Historic Landmark
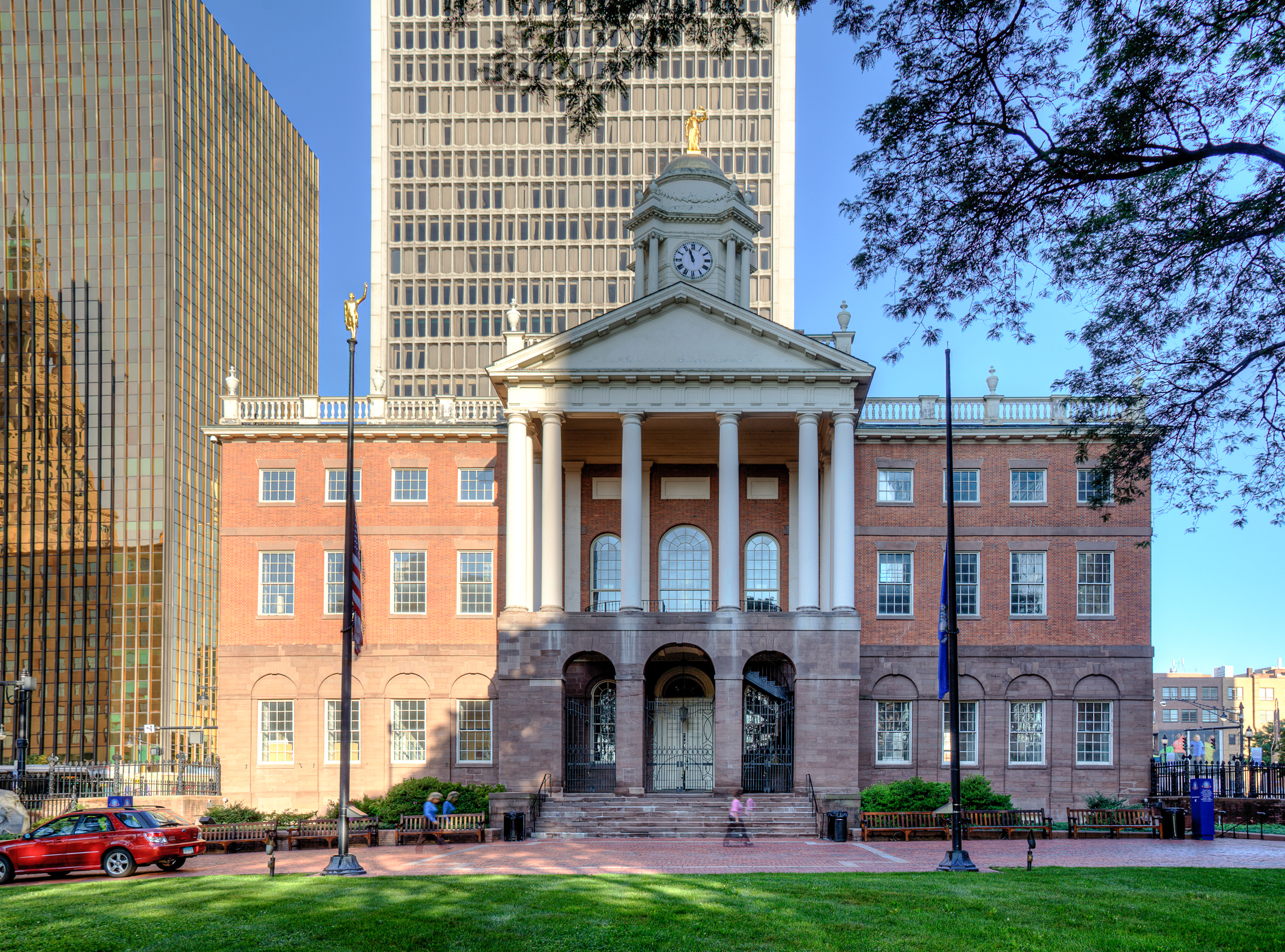
- Old State House (front facade)

- Location within Connecticut Location within the United States
- Location: Hartford, Connecticut
- Coordinates: 41°45′58″N 72°40′22″W
- Built: 1792
- Architect: Charles Bulfinch
- Architectural style: Federal
- NRHP reference No.: 66000878

Significant dates
- Added to NRHP: October 15, 1966
- Designated NHL: December 19, 1960

The Old State House (completed 1796) in Hartford, Connecticut is generally believed to have been designed by noted American architect Charles Bulfinch as his first public building. The State House is currently managed by the Office of Legislative Management of the Connecticut General Assembly.

The exterior building and the Senate have been restored to its original Federal style; the Representative's chamber is Victorian, and the halls and courtroom are Colonial Revival.

== Description ==
The Hartford State House is, in appearance, very similar to the Town Hall of Liverpool, England, built in the mid-18th century and perhaps depicted in one of Bulfinch's architecture books. However, all materials came from the United States. Its first story is 20 feet high and constructed from Portland, Connecticut brownstone. The second and third stories are brick patterned in Flemish bond. The cornice is wooden.

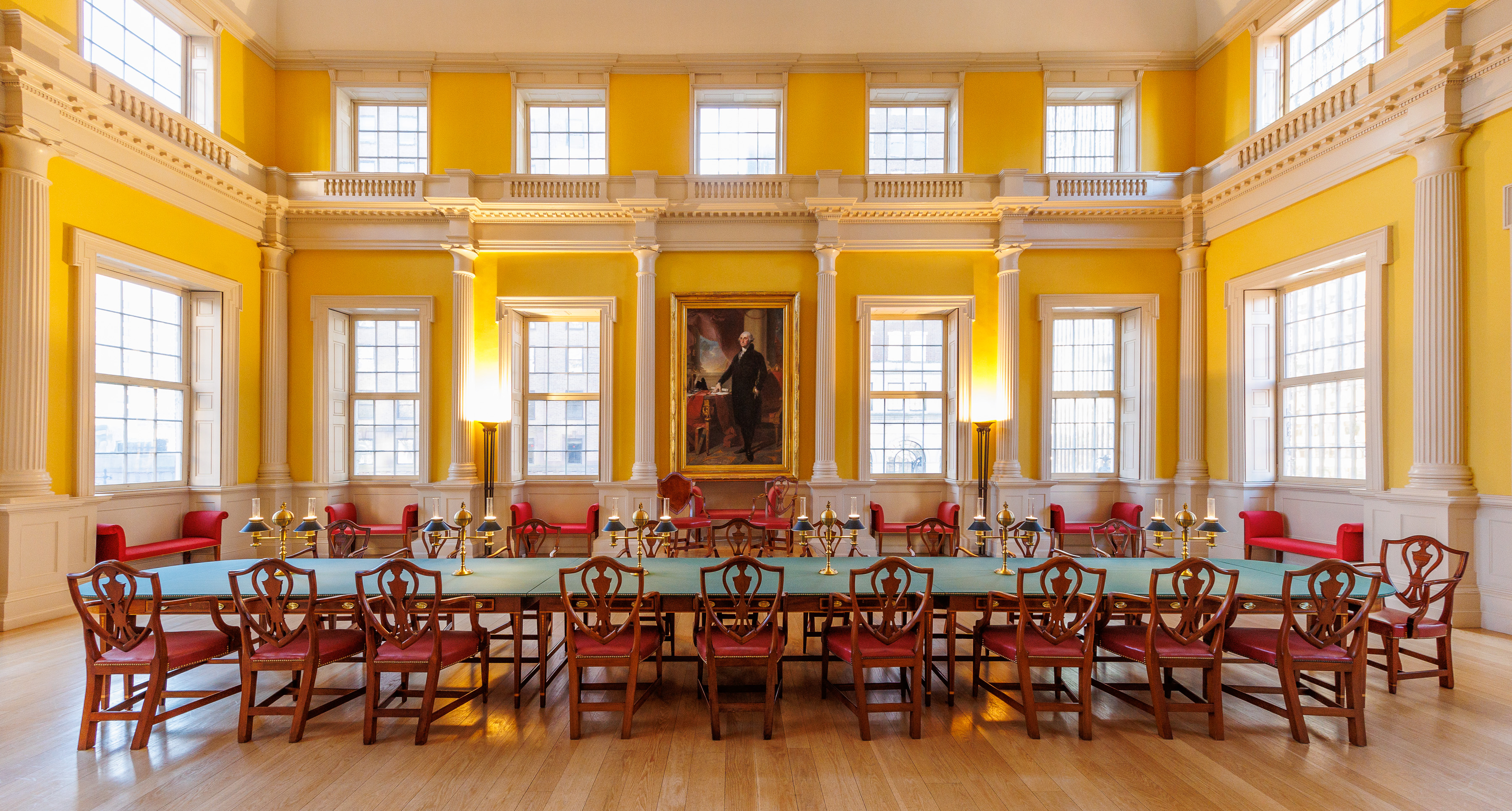
Senate Chamber with a Lansdowne Portrait of George Washington

The State House has been modified somewhat since it was first built. As originally constructed, the building had neither balustrade or cupola, but the balustrade was added in the early 19th century for the protection of firemen, and the cupola was constructed in 1827 with its bell and John Stanwood's statue of Justice. An original (1796) stone spiral staircase behind the northern arch, designed by Asher Benjamin, led to the second and third floors; it no longer exists. In 1814, the Hartford Convention was held there. In 1839, the start of the Amistad trial was held there.

The building had been in danger of closing in 2008 due to financial constraints. State and Hartford officials have recently signed a 99-year lease placing Connecticut's Old State House under new management. The lease puts the city-owned historic building under the control of the state Office of Legislative Management.

It was declared a National Historic Landmark in 1960.

Exhibits focus on the history of Hartford and important events in Connecticut history. Visitors can also tour the original legislative rooms.

== Joseph Steward Museum of Curiosities ==
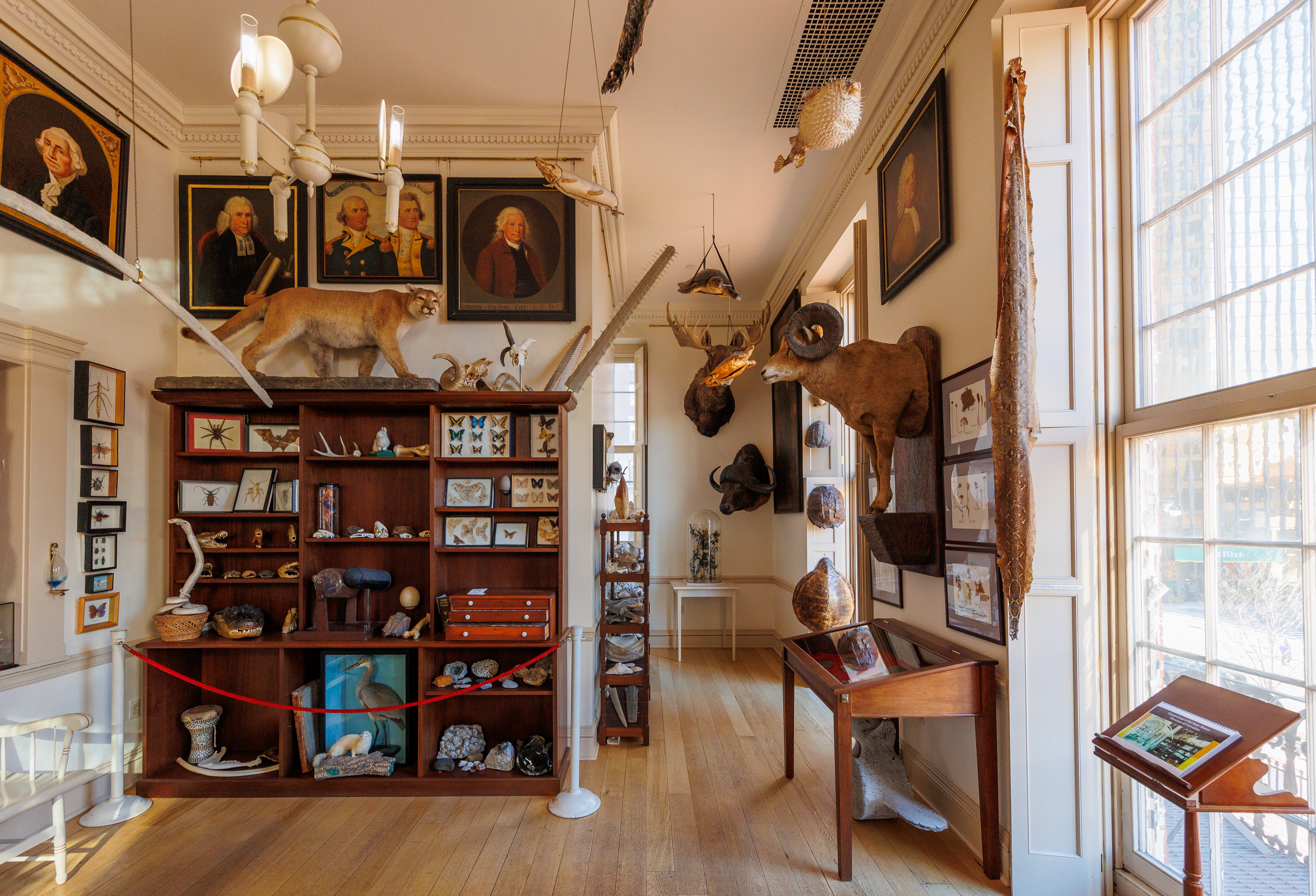
Joseph Steward Museum of Curiosities

The Museum of Natural and Other Curiosities is located on the third floor of the Old State House. The museum features a recreation of Joseph Steward's original 1798 collection of natural history displays and curiosities.

== Haunted reputation ==
Over the years, several eyewitnesses (mostly staff members) have claimed to experience paranormal activity inside the building. In 2009, the Old State House was investigated by the investigators of TAPS on episode 524 of the Sci Fi Channel program Ghost Hunters. The episode aired on December 9, 2009. Following the investigation, TAPS announced that they captured audio of strange sounds inside the building. Something that sounded like a doorknob being opened was recorded in the Senate Room while no one was in it, and audio of what sounded like a woman sighing was captured in the Steward Museum room when no female team members were present in the building. Before giving a final verdict of "haunted or not", the team plans to head back to the Old State House for a more in depth investigation. So until then, this case remains open.

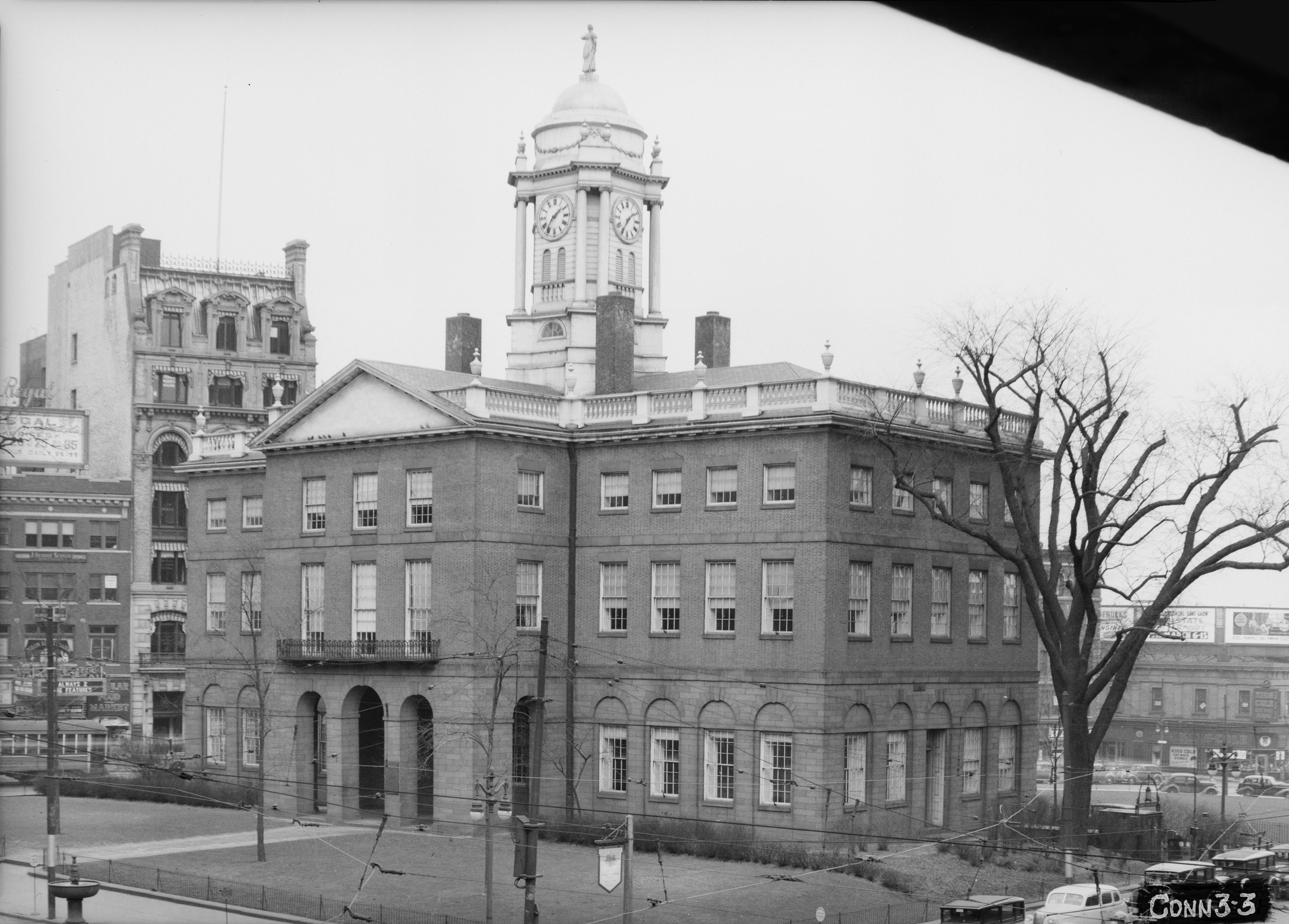
The building in 1937

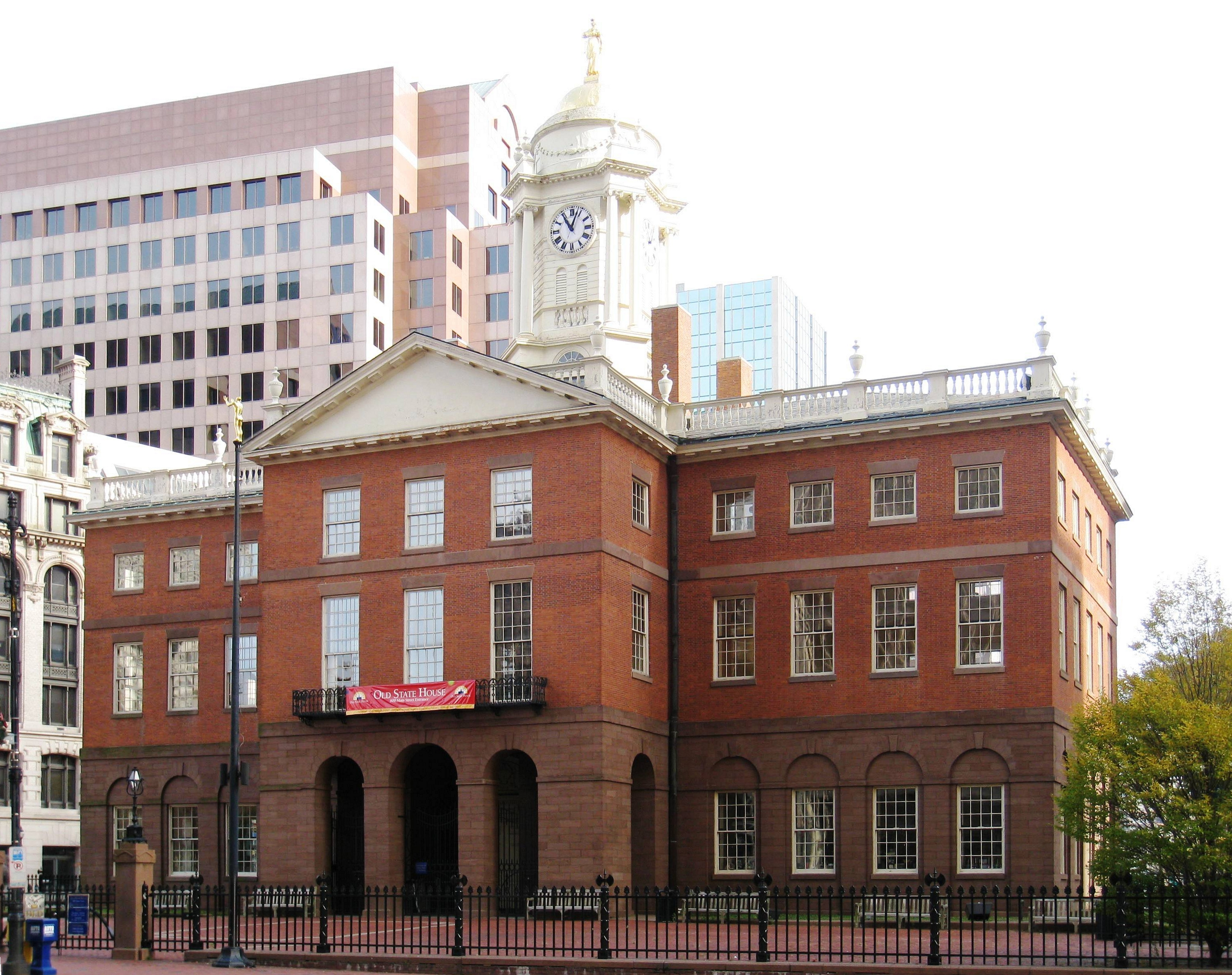
The view from the front

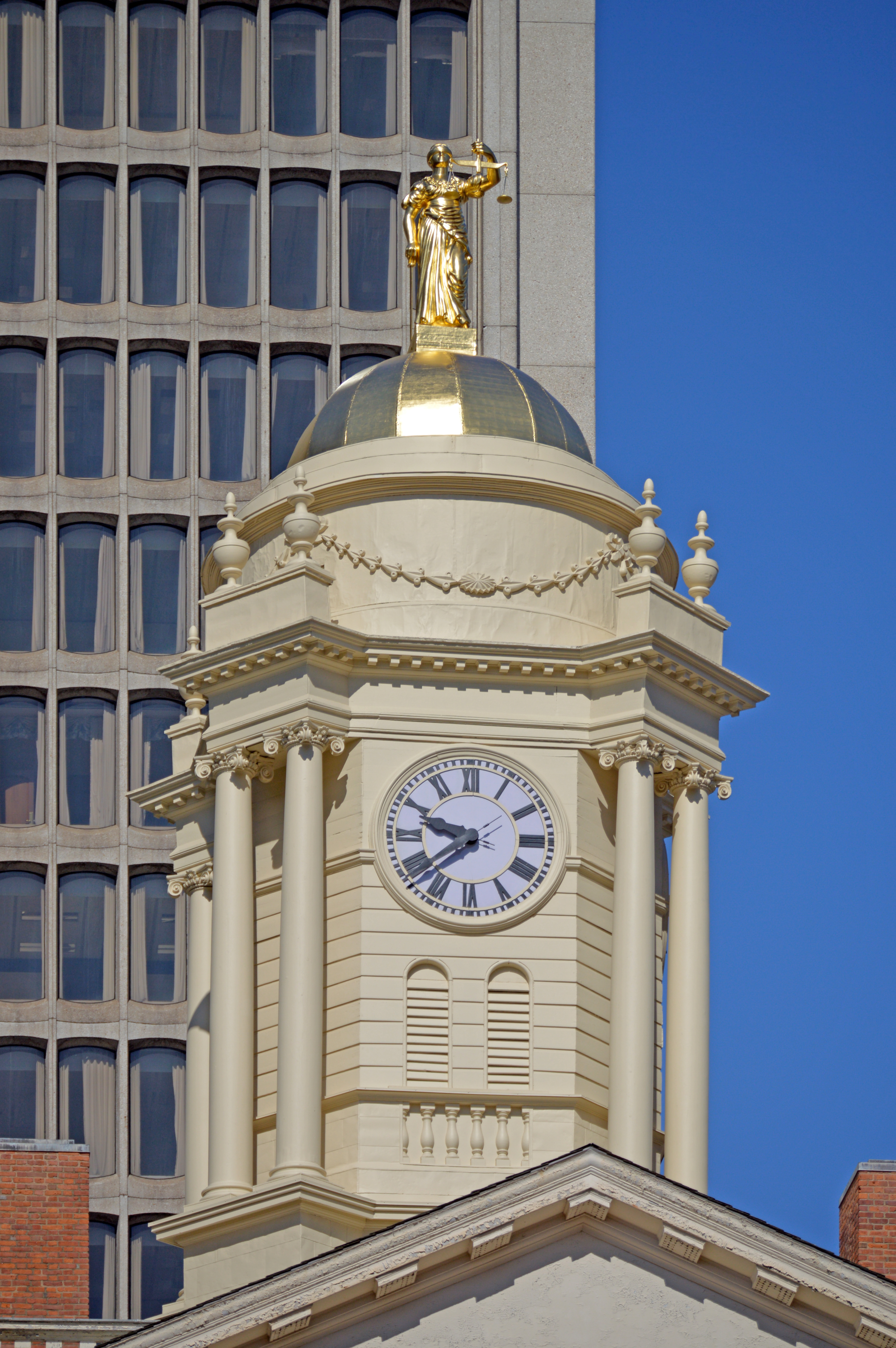
The cupola

== See also ==
- List of National Historic Landmarks in Connecticut
- National Register of Historic Places listings in Hartford, Connecticut
