= Samuel Lovett Waldo =

19th-century American portrait painter

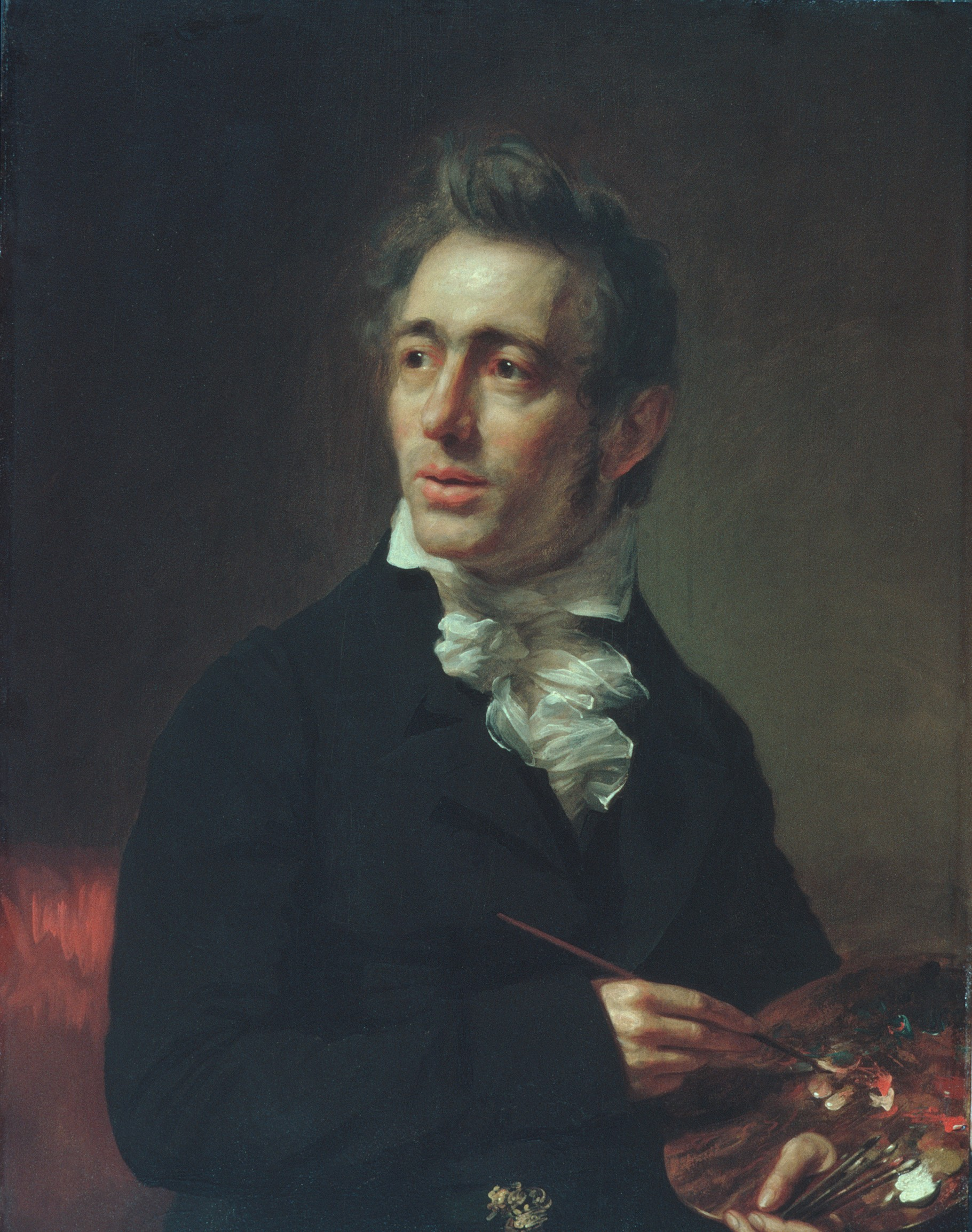
- Self-portrait (1815), Metropolitan Museum of Art
- Born: April 6, 1783; Windham, Connecticut, U.S.
- Died: February 16, 1861 (aged 77); New York City, New York, U.S.
- Known for: Portraiture
- Notable work: John Trumbull; Andrew Jackson; Pat, The Independent Beggar (1819)
- Spouse(s): Josephine Eliza Wood (m. 1808–1825, death), Deliverance Mapes (m. 1826–1865, death)
- Children: 12
- Parents: Zacheus Waldo (father); Esther (née Stevens (mother)
- Elected: Associate of the National Academy president of Cooper Institute

Samuel Lovett Waldo (April 6, 1783 – February 16, 1861) was an American portrait painter.

== Early life and studies ==
Waldo was born on April 6, 1783, in Windham, Connecticut, the son of Esther (née Stevens) and Zacheus Waldo. At the age of sixteen, he moved to Hartford to begin his formal art training under the tutelage of Joseph Steward, a prominent local artist.

Four years later, he set up shop as a portraitist in Hartford, later relocating to Litchfield, Connecticut. While in Hartford, he had made the acquaintance of congressman John Rutledge, Jr., who was impressed with his work and, in 1803, invited him to come to Charleston, South Carolina. From 1803 to 1805, Waldo earned a sizable income from his commissions and decided that he would use the money to study art in London. He studied under Benjamin West in London.

He arrived in London in 1806 with letters of introduction to Benjamin West and John Singleton Copley. While studying with them, he also studied drawing at the Royal Academy and exhibited a portrait there in 1808.

Between his artistic activities, he met and married Elizabeth Wood of Liverpool in London in 1808, and the couple journeyed back to New York City to live. Together they had five children that survived infancy. Elizabeth died in 1825. The following year, on 9 May 1826, Waldo married Deliverance Mapes of Southhold, Long Island. Maintaining their household in New York City, Samuel and Deliverance had seven more children.

== Later career and activities ==
In 1809, he had returned to the United States and established a portrait studio in New York City.

Three years later William Jewett (d. 24 March 1874), a young coach painter from New London, Connecticut, who wanted to be a fine artist, approached Waldo and asked to be taken in as an apprentice. Waldo agreed and allowed him to live with his family during his time of study. In 1818, they entered into a formal partnership which lasted until 1854, when Jewett retired. As a team, it is generally believed that Waldo painted the head and hands of their subjects, while Jewett filled in the clothing and draperies.

In addition to his painting, Waldo served as a director of the American Academy of the Fine Arts from 1817 until its dissolution in 1841. He was also a founding member of the National Academy of Design.

== Death and legacy ==
He died in New York City on February 16, 1861.

Waldo's work is found in many public museum collections, including at the Montgomery Museum of Fine Arts.

== Selected portraits ==
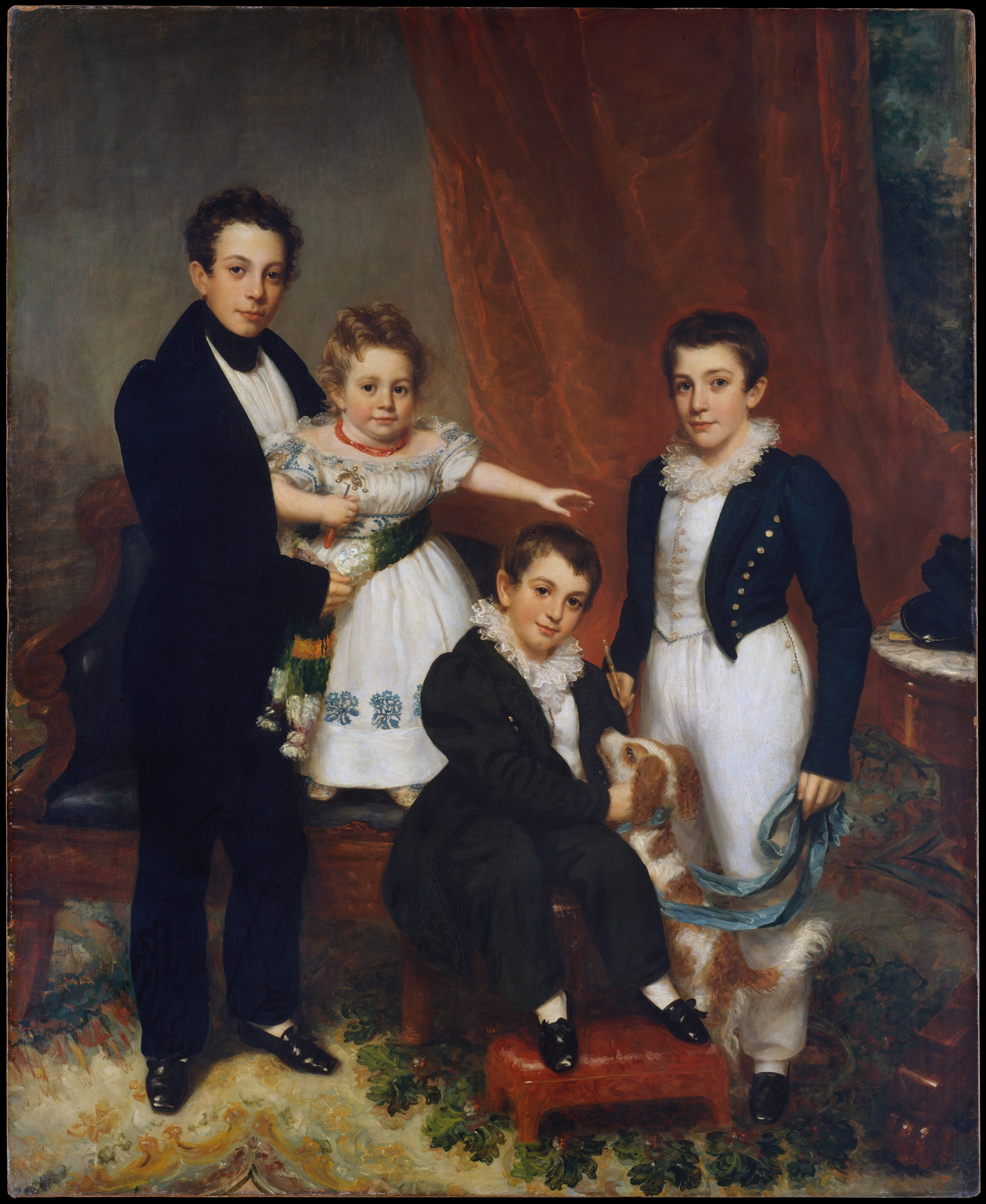
The Knapp Children, (c.1832, with Jewett) Metropolitan Museum of Art

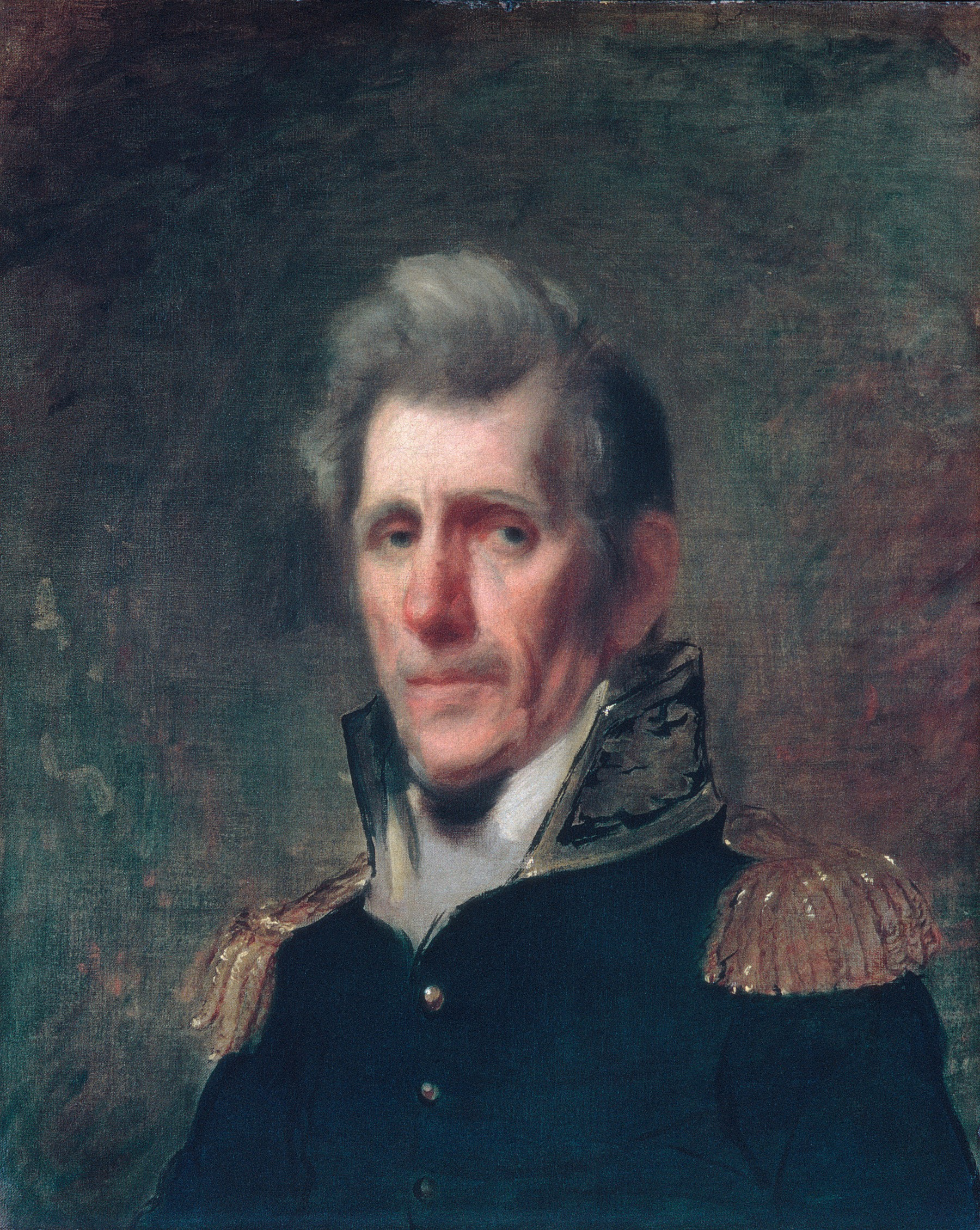
General Andrew Jackson, (1819), Metropolitan Museum of Art

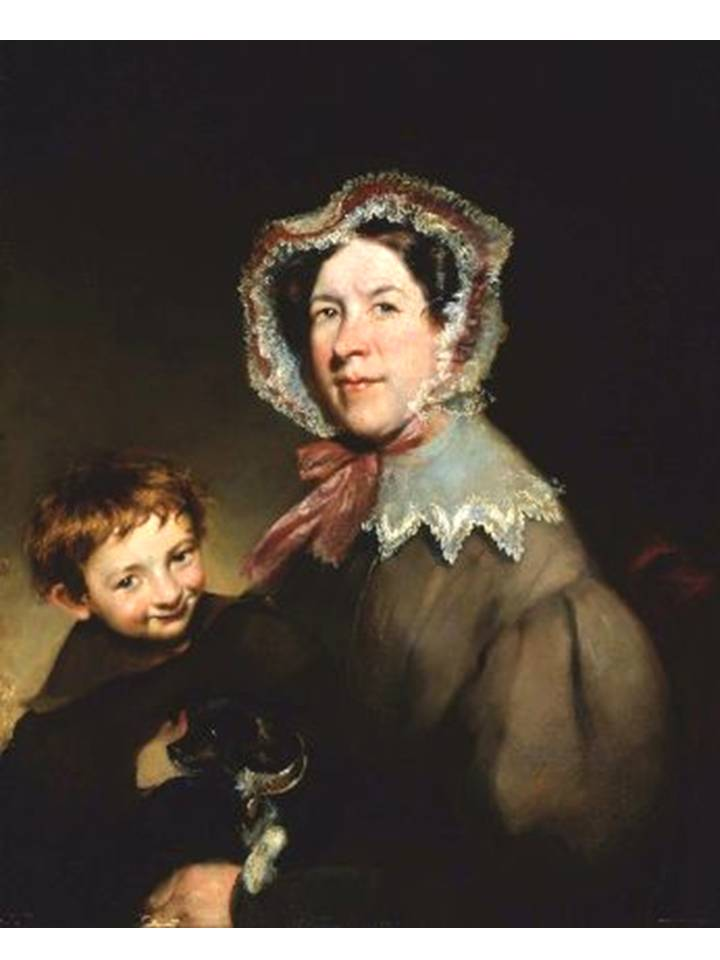
Deliverance Mapes and Her Son, (c.1830), Boston Museum of Fine Arts

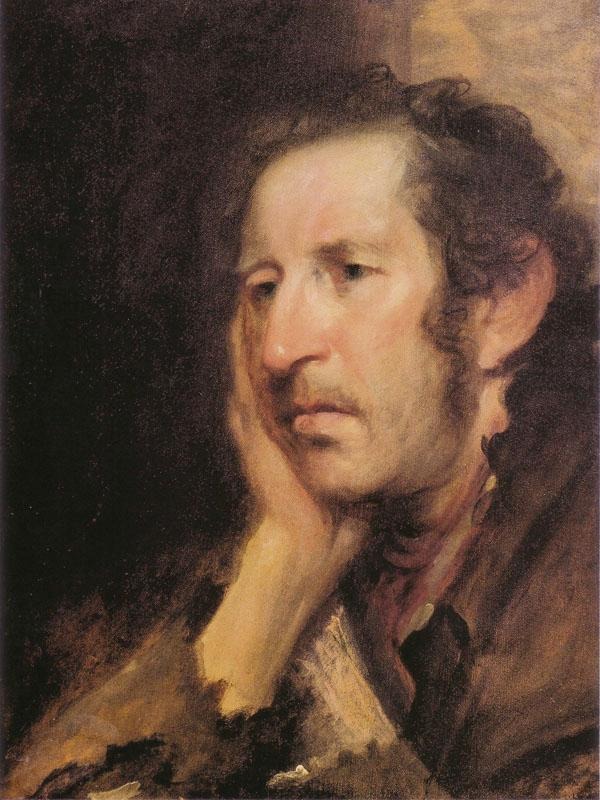
Pat, The Independent Beggar, (1819), New Britain Museum of American Art

== See also ==
- Chisholm, Hugh, ed. (1911). "Waldo, Samuel Lovett" . Encyclopædia Britannica. Vol. 28 (11th ed.). Cambridge University Press. p. 258.
- Portrait painting
