= Dartmouth University =

Defunct university in New Hampshire (1817–1819)

- Active: 1817–1819
- Location: New Hampshire
- Language: English

Dartmouth University is a defunct institution in New Hampshire which existed from 1817 to 1819. It was the result of a thwarted attempt by the state legislature to make Dartmouth College, a private college, into a public university. The United States Supreme Court case that settled the matter, Dartmouth College v. Woodward, is considered a landmark.

== History (1817–1819) ==
Dartmouth University operated in Hanover, New Hampshire, on the campus of Dartmouth College. The university was established by the New Hampshire Legislature in an act of June 27, 1816. The college trustees had dismissed President John Wheelock, and his allies in Concord sought to reinstate him through legislation. The act ostensibly modified the existing charter rather than establishing a new institution: it attempted to change the name to Dartmouth University, to increase the number of trustees from twelve to twenty-one, and to create a board of twenty-five overseers, including, ex officio, the governor and council, the president of the Senate, the Speaker of the House, and the governor and lieutenant-governor of Vermont.

The legislature had some reason to see the existing school as a state charity. Dartmouth used the terms "college" and "university" almost interchangeably in its early years. It accepted state grants of land and money, including the Second College Grant and state funding for the construction of its medical school in 1811. It included in its first board of trustees the governor, the president of Governor's Council, two council members, the Speaker of the New Hampshire House, and an assistant of the Colony of Connecticut.

Many of Dartmouth's existing trustees refused to obey the legislature's act, however, and the trustees of Dartmouth University failed to obtain a quorum to conduct any business. In response, the legislature voted on December 18, 1816, that the governor had the power to fill the vacancies left by the Trustees who would not submit (eight known as "the Octagon") and decided to reduce the number required for a quorum. The university trustees met and brought the university into being during 1817. John Wheelock was named president, but upon his death in 1817 was replaced by his son-in-law, William Allen.

Dartmouth University as the legislature saw it would offer a broad professional program, including separate schools of law and medicine. The existing medical school continued to operate, but the rest of the university remained small: professors taught classes to a small number of undergraduates in Dartmouth Hall. The university took possession of the college charter and its seal, hiding them in a nearby farmhouse. A small group of university professors and allied townspeople attempted to take the private libraries of the college's two literary societies, the Social Friends and the United Fraternity, which were located in Dartmouth Hall. Students living in the building heard the sound of an axe breaking down the door of the U.F. library at night and sounded the alarm. A group of students wielding sticks of firewood soon forced the professors out, and the societies removed their libraries to keep them from falling into the hands of the university.

The college, meanwhile, rented rooms in a building north of Dartmouth Hall and filed a suit in the county court to regain its property. Though lacking its former buildings, the college retained most of its students and had a much larger enrollment than the university. Students of the two institutions would pass each other on the Green between classes, and the two schools competed to reserve the college church for commencements on the same day. Both schools graduated students in 1817 and 1818.

Though the college effectively was fighting for its life against the legislature, its cause of action ostensibly sought the return of the charter and the seal from the university treasurer, William H. Woodward. The school lost and appealed the case directly to the state's supreme court, where it lost again and appealed to the U.S. Supreme Court. Daniel Webster argued the side of the college in the Dartmouth College Case, describing the charter this way: "A charter of more liberal sentiments, of wiser provisions, drawn with more care, or in a better spirit, could not be expected at any time or from any other source."

The court decided the case near the end of 1818 and released Chief Justice John Marshall's opinion in February 1819. The decision declared the legislature's acts unconstitutional as interferences with the obligations of a contract, whether that contract was seen as the one that existed between college founder Eleazar Wheelock and the Crown, the one between the school's various benefactors and the Crown, or between some other combination of parties. When the news reached Hanover several days later, the college and university were between terms, with few students in town. Many townspeople who supported the college celebrated, however, cheering loudly in the streets and firing a cannon. That spring, Dartmouth College reoccupied its buildings.

The New Hampshire Legislature would not attempt to establish another university until the 1860s, when it created the land-grant forerunner of the University of New Hampshire, originally called the New Hampshire College of Agriculture and the Mechanic Arts – in Hanover, associated with Dartmouth College.

== See also ==
- Trustees of Dartmouth College v. Woodward, 17 U.S. 518 (1819)
