= Samuel Harris (theologian) =

American academic administrator

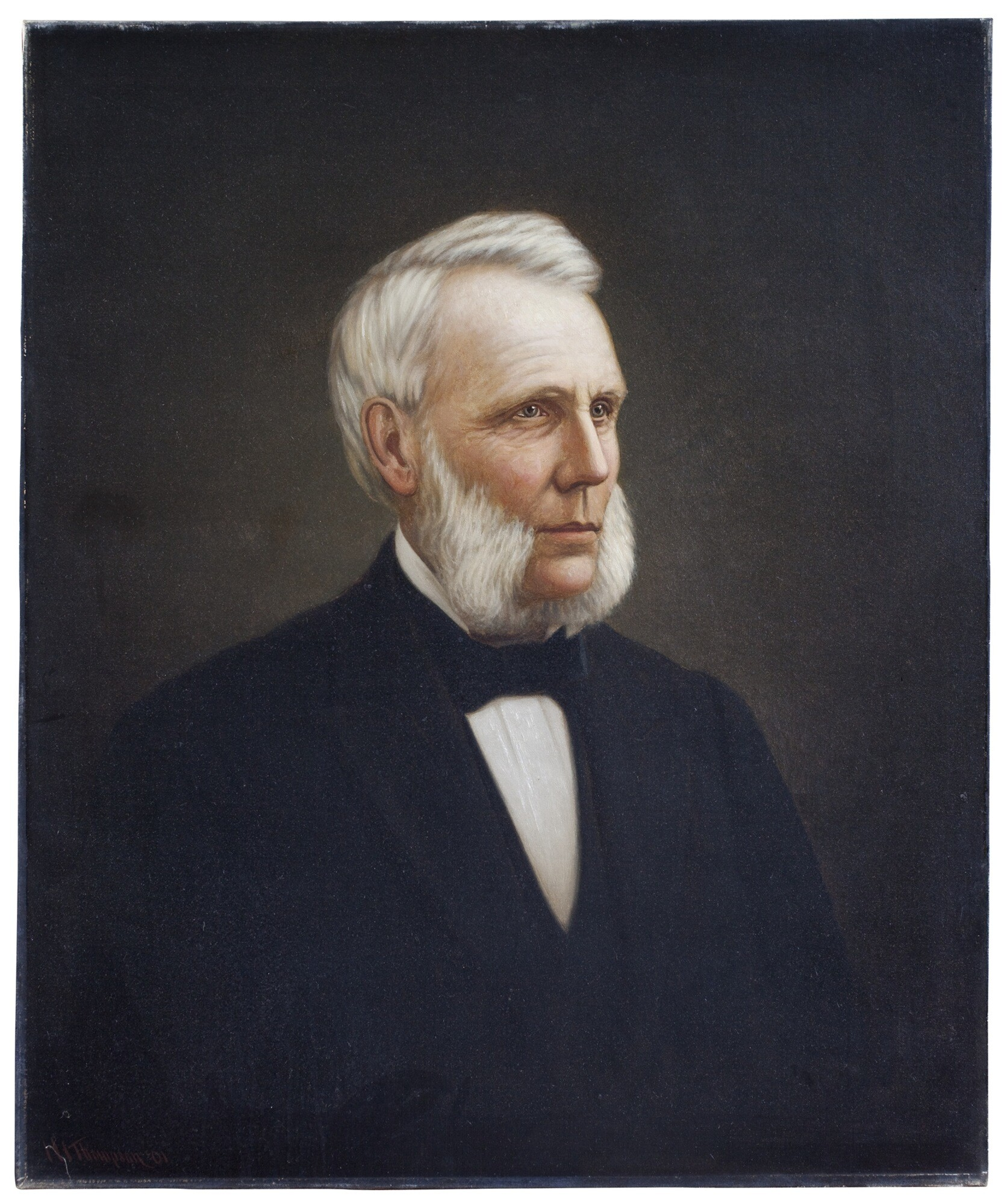

5th President of Bowdoin College
- In office 1867–1871
- Preceded by: Leonard Woods
- Succeeded by: Joshua Chamberlain

Personal details
- Born: June 14, 1814; East Machias, Maine
- Died: June 25, 1899 (aged 85); Litchfield, Connecticut
- Education: Bowdoin College; Andover Theological Seminary

Samuel Harris (June 14, 1814 – June 25, 1899) was the fifth president of Bowdoin College and the first to be an alumnus. After having left Bowdoin in 1871, he went on to teach at Yale Divinity School for 25 years.

== Career ==
Harris was born in East Machias, Maine, on June 14, 1814, and attended Washington Academy in the same town. After having graduated from Bowdoin in 1833, he attended Andover Theological Seminary in Massachusetts. Harris had been a pastor in Conway, Massachusetts, and Pittsfield, Massachusetts, from 1841 to 1855 and had taught at the Divinity School in Bangor, Maine, before becoming president of Bowdoin in 1867. Having lived in Maine throughout the American Civil War, he was considered by many as a candidate for the United States Senate. Nevertheless, Harris resigned from his position at Bowdoin in 1871 after having grown tired of such activities as fund-raising.

In the same year, he began working at Yale as the Dwight Professor of Systematic Theology. There, he wrote much more often, especially in the 1880s when he published his first major work, The Philosophical Basis of Theism, which received notice from England to Japan. Additionally, God the Creator and Lord of All explained his doctrinal system and he had been writing an unfinished book at the time of his death. When he resigned in 1895, he was given the title of Professor Emeritus. He continued to lecture at the school for an additional two years before permanently retiring.

He died at his summer home in Litchfield, Connecticut, on June 25, 1899.

== Published works ==
=== Lectures ===
- The Kingdom of Christ on Earth (1875)
- The Philosophical Basis of Theism (1888)
- The Self-Revelation of God
- God the Creator and Lord of All

Preceded by Leonard Woods	President of Bowdoin College; 1867–71	Succeeded by Joshua Chamberlain
