= Moor's Charity School =

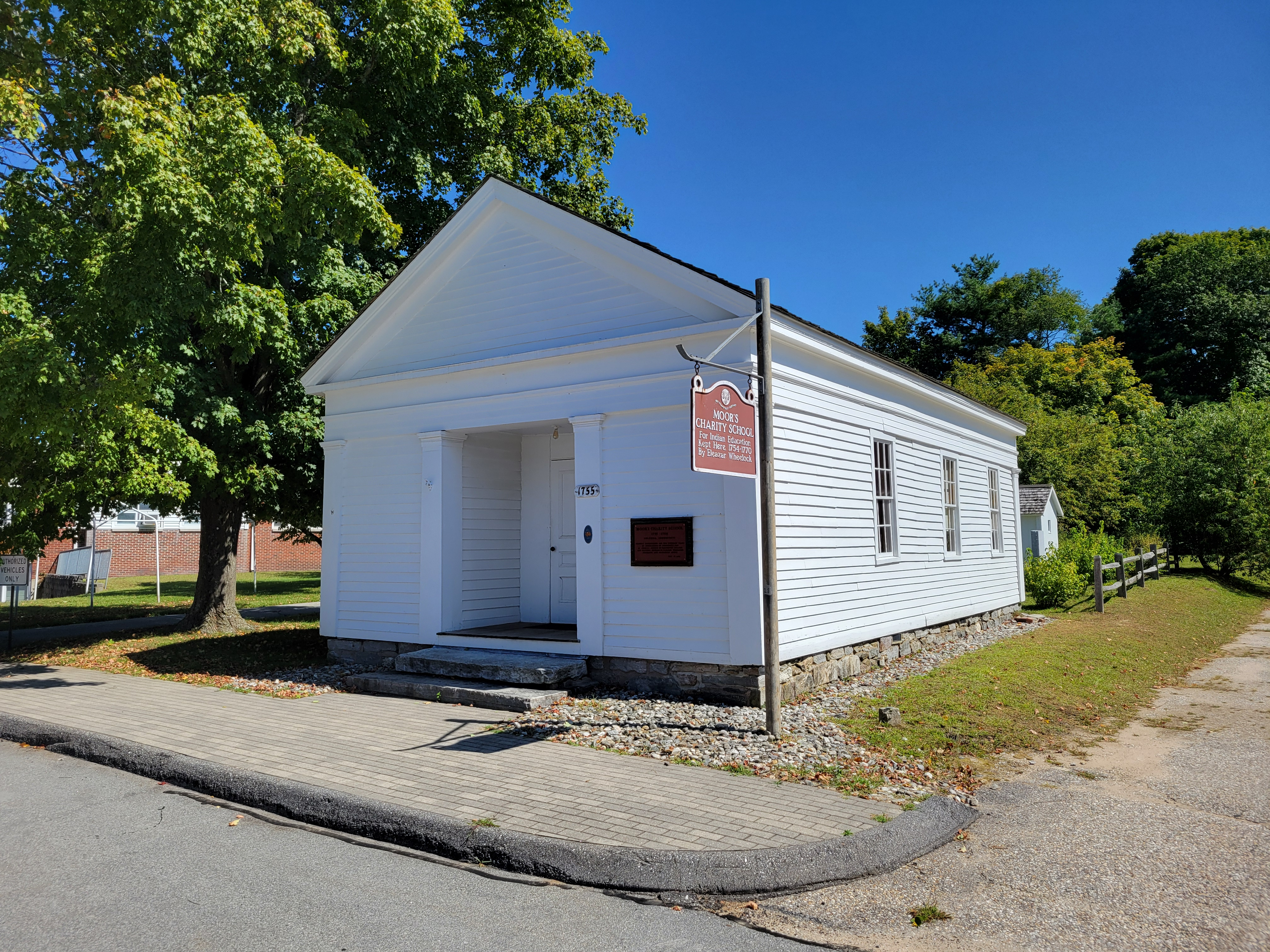
- Picture of Moor's Charity School where it sits today, located in Columbia, Connecticut. The building has undergone some renovations, and now serves as a museum and preserves the history of the school.
- Lebanon, Connecticut; United States

Information
- Type: Charity school
- Established: 1754
- Closed: 1770
- Enrollment: 67

Moor's Charity School was founded in 1754 in Lebanon, Connecticut (now in the town of Columbia), by the Puritan Calvinist minister Eleazar Wheelock. His purpose in founding Moor's Charity School was to provide education to Native Americans in hopes that they would serve as missionaries to their native tribes.

Eleazar Wheelock became involved in education when Samson Occom, a Mohegan Native American, asked Rev. Wheelock for instruction. The English School with teacher Eleazar Wheelock and just one Native student, Samson Occom, transformed into Moor's Indian Charity School. Wheelock was able to start Moor's Charity School because of a donation by Joshua Moor, who donated two acres of land and the school building. This donation led Wheelock to name the charity school after Moor. From 1750 to the early 1770s forty-nine Native American boys and eighteen Native American girls were educated at the school.

In order to raise more money for the school, Occom went on a successful fundraising tour of Britain between the years 1766 and 1768, raising over 12,000 pounds. However, while Occom was busy raising money for the school, Wheelock's ambitions for the school changed drastically. Between 1754 and 1768, only 15 out of over 50 students had successfully returned as missionaries to their home tribes. With such a low success rate, Wheelock shifted his focus away from converting Indians into missionaries, and instead wanted to build a school for the Englishmen. Wheelock began looking for places he could move the school to, and he got a few offers for different sites across different states. However, the offer by John Wentworth, governor of New Hampshire, stood out to Wheelock. Wentworth offered Wheelock a township grant and a charter to establish his school in what is now Hanover, New Hampshire. Rev. Wheelock took Occom's fundraising money, moved the school to New Hampshire, and used the money to build what is now Dartmouth College.

Controversy existed with this action. Samson Occom charged, "All the money has done is, it has made Doctor's [Wheelock] family very grand in the World." In addition to this, the new location of the school was set upon a part of the Abenaki Territory, an area that was unfriendly with the Mohegans. Subsequently, Wheelock and Occom had a large falling out, and Occom never once visited the Dartmouth campus.
