= John Wheelock =

American statesman (1754–1817); 2nd president of Dartmouth College (1779–1815)

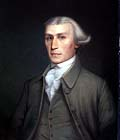
- Posthumous portrait, c. 1875

2nd President of Dartmouth College
- In office 1779–1815
- Preceded by: Eleazar Wheelock
- Succeeded by: Francis Brown

Personal details
- Born: January 28, 1754 Lebanon, Colony of Connecticut, British America
- Died: April 4, 1817 (aged 63) Hanover, New Hampshire, United States

John Wheelock (January 28, 1754 – April 4, 1817) was the eldest son of Eleazar Wheelock who was the founder and first president of Dartmouth College; John Wheelock succeeded his father as the College’s second president.

== Early life ==
John Wheelock was born in Lebanon, Connecticut on January 28, 1754, the son of Eleazar Wheelock, the director Moor's Indian Charity School (founded 1754), and Mary Brinsmead Wheelock. He is a descendant of Ralph Wheelock, the first teacher in the British Colonies. Though he began his higher education at Yale, Wheelock followed his father to Hanover, New Hampshire when his father founded Dartmouth, and completed his studies there, where he was a member of the College’s inaugural graduating class in 1771.

In 1776, Wheelock became a leader of the United Committees, a group of disgruntled New Hampshire citizens angry at their lack of representation in the state legislature and the distance of the state capital; in retaliation for these slights, Wheelock and others led twelve New Hampshire towns to secede from the state and attempt to join Vermont. The next year, 1777, as the Revolutionary War raged, Wheelock briefly served in New York and Vermont as a lieutenant colonel in Colonel Bedel's Regiment. He carried on correspondence with, among others, George Washington.

== Presidency of Dartmouth College ==
Upon his father's death in 1779, John Wheelock assumed the presidency of the College, despite the fact that he was neither an academic nor a minister.

During his almost forty years as Dartmouth's president (1779–1815), Wheelock oversaw the construction of Dartmouth Hall and the founding of Dartmouth Medical School, the fourth-oldest medical school in the country; he also maintained the College’s fiscal solvency throughout the Revolutionary War, mainly through the Vermont legislature’s grant of 23,000 acres (93 km^{2}) in Wheelock, Vermont.

During the latter half of Wheelock's tenure, he became embroiled in a dispute with Dartmouth’s Board of Trustees. Wheelock proceeded to convince the governor of New Hampshire to fill the Board with supporters and turn Dartmouth College into a state-controlled Dartmouth University. The original, private Board resisted and eventually sued. The case, Dartmouth College v. Woodward, went through various judicial courts, before the United States Supreme Court decided in the Board's favor in 1819, the result of a brilliant peroration by Dartmouth alumnus Daniel Webster, class of 1801, who had, ironically, graduated under Wheelock's tenure. However, by this time, Wheelock, who had been forced out of the presidency in 1815 by failing health and poor relations with the Board, had died. He was succeeded by Francis Brown.

Wheelock died on April 4, 1817, and is buried near his father in the cemetery in Hanover, NH.
