= Leonard Woods (college president) =

Fourth president of Bowdoin College (1807–1878)

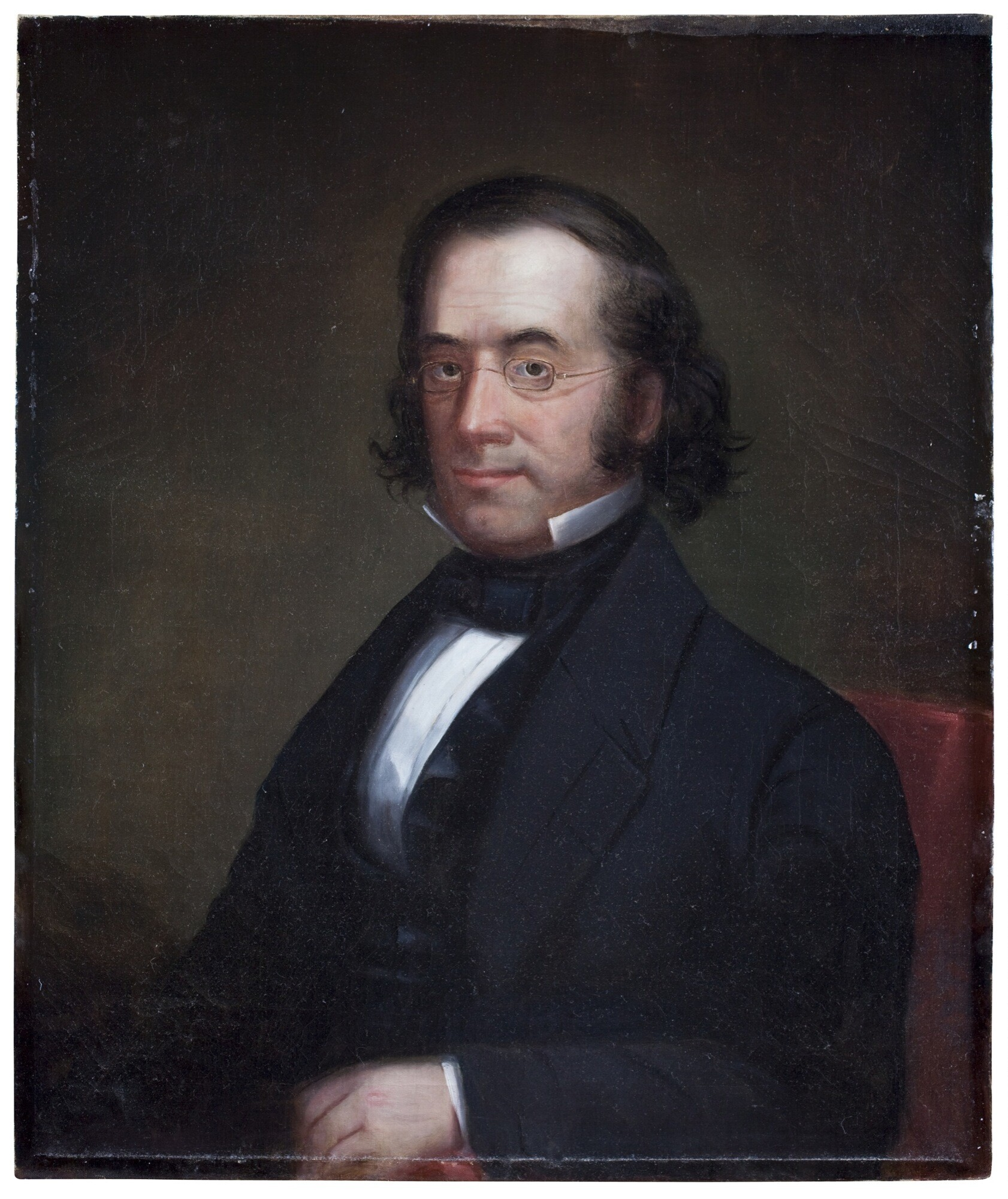

4th President of Bowdoin College
- In office 1839–1866
- Preceded by: William Allen
- Succeeded by: Samuel Harris

Personal details
- Born: November 24, 1807 Newbury, Massachusetts
- Died: December 24, 1878 (aged 71) Boston, Massachusetts
- Education: Union College

Leonard Woods (November 24, 1807 – December 24, 1878) was the fourth president of Bowdoin College.

== Life and career ==
Born in Newbury, Massachusetts, Woods attended Phillips Andover Academy before graduating from Union College in 1827 with Phi Beta Kappa honors and membership in Kappa Alpha Society. After having graduated from Andover Theological Seminary, he made a translation of George Christian Knapp's Christian Theology, which became long used as a textbook in American theological seminaries.

When he became president of Bowdoin in 1839, he was only 32 years old. He held his position until 1866. During his tenure, the College built Appleton Hall, the Chapel, and Adams Hall, which housed the Medical School of Maine and the undergraduate laboratories. Woods was a recipient of advanced degrees from Colby College, Harvard University, and Bowdoin. He was elected a member of the American Antiquarian Society in 1845.

Woods died in 1878 in Boston, Massachusetts.

Woods, "while an object of suspicion to many contemporaries because of his pronounced opposition to the abolitionist movement," was remembered as "an inspiring teacher and a man of unusual breadth of scholarship and culture."

Preceded by William Allen	President of Bowdoin College; 1839–66	Succeeded by Samuel Harris
