= Eleazar Wheelock =

American Congregational minister, educator, and founder of Dartmouth College

The Reverend Eleazar Wheelock
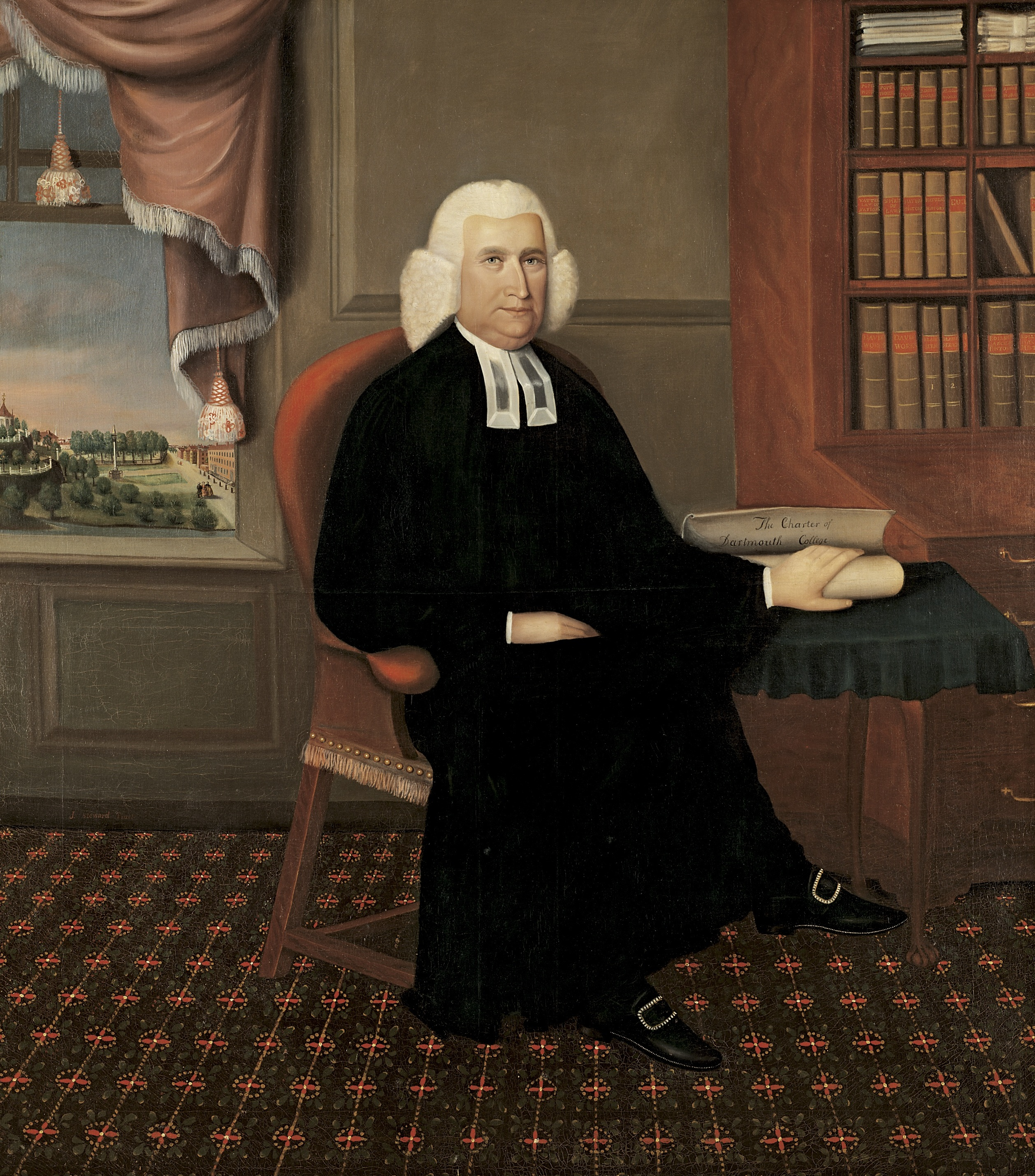
- Portrait by Joseph Steward, c. 1793–1796

1st President of Dartmouth College
- In office 1768–1779
- Succeeded by: John Wheelock

Personal details
- Born: April 22, 1711 Windham, Connecticut Colony, British America
- Died: April 24, 1779 (aged 68) Hanover, New Hampshire, United States
- Education: Yale College (1733)

Eleazar Wheelock (April 22, 1711 – April 24, 1779) was an American Congregational minister, orator, and educator in present-day Columbia, Connecticut, for 35 years before founding Dartmouth College in New Hampshire. He had tutored Samson Occom, a Mohegan who became a Presbyterian minister and the second Native American to publish writings in English. Before founding Dartmouth, Wheelock founded and ran the Moor's Charity School in Connecticut to educate Native Americans. From 1750 to the early 1770s forty-nine Native American boys and eighteen Native American girls were educated at the school, while it sometimes catered to the sons of poor colonists. As a slave owner he converted numerous slaves to Christianity.

== Early life and education ==
Eleazar Wheelock was born in Windham, Connecticut, to Ralph Wheelock and Ruth Huntington, who had a prosperous farm of 300 acres. He was the great-grandson of the first teacher of the first free school in the United States (see Dedham, Massachusetts), the Rev. Ralph Wheelock. In 1733, he graduated from Yale College, having won the first award of the Dean Berkeley Donation for distinction in classics. He continued his theological studies at Yale until he was licensed to preach in May 1734.

== Marriage and family ==
Two months after beginning as pastor of a church, on April 29, 1735, he married Sarah Davenport. She died in 1746. They managed a farm in addition to his pastoring, and he was an itinerant preacher during the 1730s and 1740s.

He married a second time to Mary Brinsmead, a widow with two children. In total he had eight children with his wives and two step-children.

== Career ==
Wheelock was installed as the pastor of the Second Congregational Church of Lebanon Crank, Connecticut (now Columbia, Connecticut), in February 1735 and served as their minister for 34 years. Wheelock also acted as an itinerant preacher during the Great Awakening, a religious revival that had begun to sweep the Connecticut River Valley around the time of his graduation from Yale. He was one of its greatest proponents in the state, serving as the "chief intelligencer of revival news".

In addition, Wheelock was deeply concerned about Native Americans in New England, whose numbers had declined rapidly due to disease, warfare and social disruption, including continued encroachment on their lands by colonists.

Wheelock was a slave owner who converted his own and numerous other slaves to Christianity. Not long before he died he freed two of his slaves, making sure they could fare for themselves before simply releasing them.

== Christian missionary ==
In 1743, Wheelock took in a student named Samson Occom, a Mohegan who knew English and had converted to Christianity in his childhood. He taught Occom for four years; the youth was a ready student, learning to read and write in Hebrew as well as deeply studying theology. After preaching for several years to the Pequot people in Montauk on eastern Long Island, Occom was ordained in Suffolk County, New York, as a Presbyterian minister. He returned to Connecticut to preach to the Mohegan and later organized Christian Indians as the Brothertown Indians. Wheelock's success in preparing Occom for the ministry encouraged him to found a school in Columbia, Connecticut, for Native Americans. He planned to teach the boys in both secular and Christian subjects, so they could return to their native culture as missionaries. The girls would learn "housewifery" and English skills including reading and writing. Charitable contributions from New England and England supported the Moor's Charity School, which was located on Columbia's town green. Some students became homesick or even ill and died; few became missionaries.

== Establishment of Dartmouth College and presidency ==
After sending Occom and another minister on a speaking tour of England to raise money for the charity school, Wheelock decided to enlarge it, as well as adding college classes for the education of American colonists in the classics, philosophy, and literature. He began to search for another location for the schools. Wheelock obtained a charter from George III on December 13, 1769. Having worked and raised funds for the education of Native Americans, Occom and the British Board of Trustees headed by Lord Dartmouth opposed the addition of the college to benefit the sons of white colonists.

Wheelock kept the lord's donation and named the college after him, as Dartmouth College. He chose Hanover, New Hampshire, for the location and became the college's president. In 1771, four students were graduated in Dartmouth's first commencement, including Wheelock's son John. While some Native Americans attended Dartmouth, it primarily served the sons of white colonists. Wheelock died during the American Revolutionary War on April 24, 1779. He is buried in Hanover. His writings include "Narrative of the Indian School at Lebanon."

== Legacy and honors ==
- Wheelock, Vermont, in Caledonia County is named for him.
- During World War II a Liberty Ship (Maritime Hull Number 0038) was named for Wheelock. This was a C-2 cargo ship outfitted to carry 550 troops. It participated in the Normandy Invasion and is frequently mentioned in the book The Far Shore by the American author Max Miller.

== Notable descendants ==
- Colonel Eleazer Louis Ripley Wheelock, soldier, real estate prospector, Indian agent, founder of Wheelock, Texas, Texas Ranger, surveyor, Texas pioneer.
- John Wheelock, second president of Dartmouth College.
- Homer Hulbert, American missionary and Korean independence activist
- John Hall Wheelock, 20th-century poet
- Kenny Mayne, American sports journalist

== Sources ==
- McCallum, James Dow (1943). "Eleazar Wheelock". Dictionary of American biography. New York: Charles Scribner's Sons.
