= Joseph Steward =

American painter

Joseph Steward (July 6, 1753 – April 15, 1822) was an American minister, portrait painter and museum curator.

== Minister ==
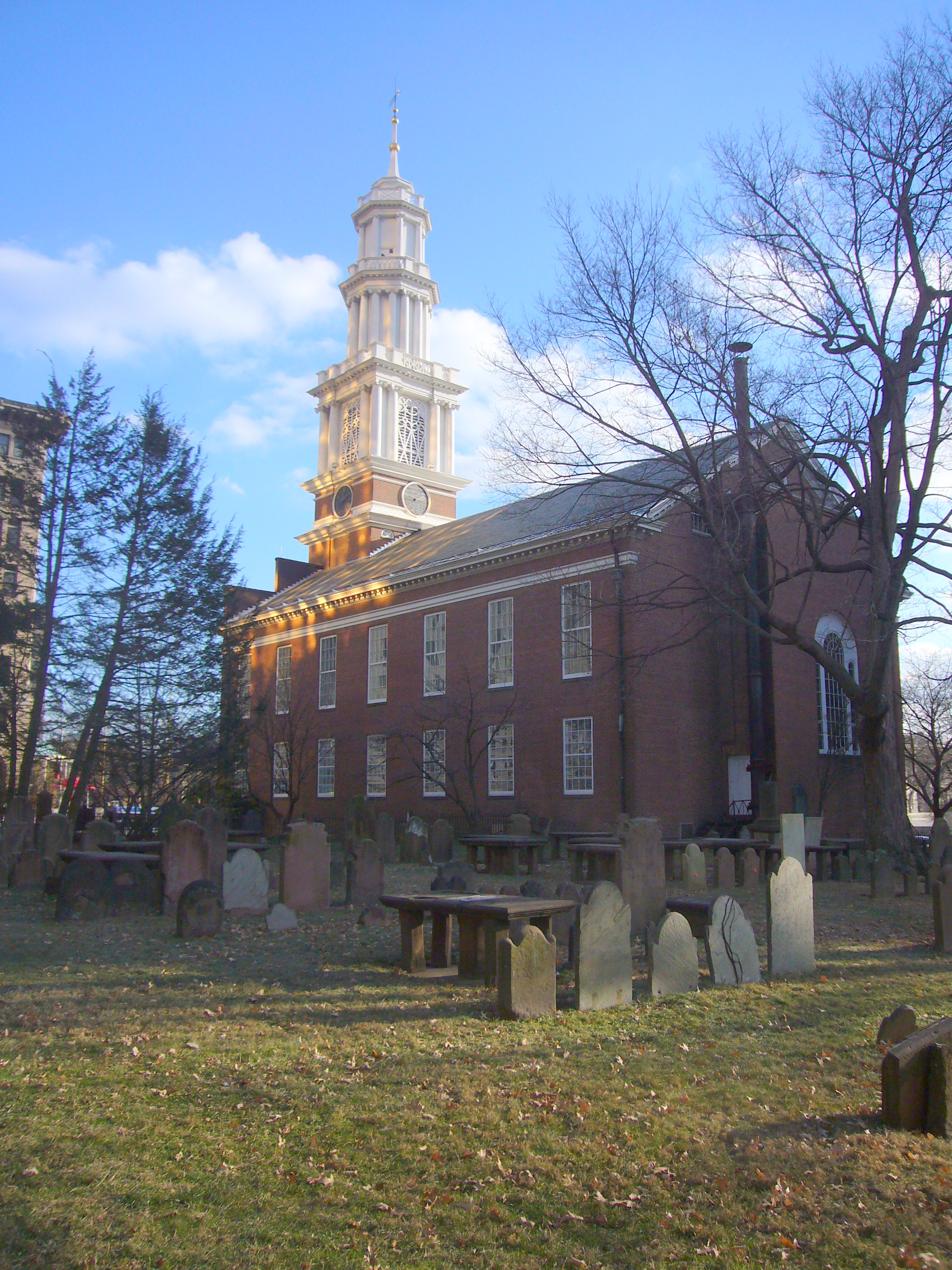
First Church of Christ

Joseph Steward was born on July 6, 1753, the son of Joseph and Jane (Wilson) Steward of Upton, MA. He attended Dartmouth College, graduating in 1780. Under the guidance of Reverend Doctor Levi Hart of Preston, CT, he continued his divinity studies and was licensed to preach in 1786. However, before long, he became seriously ill and was unable to maintain the parish he had been assigned to in Newport, RI. It is not known for certain what ailment Steward had, but one source suggests it was bronchitis. He remained in Newport for two years while being nursed back to health. In 1788, he moved to Hampton, CT to fill in for the town's reverend, Samuel Moseley, who had recently become gravely ill. While there, Steward met Sarah Moseley, the reverend's daughter, and they were married on May 31, 1789. They had four children: Sally (Sarah) born in 1790, Joseph (1792), Mariah (1796), and Anna (1799).

Steward continued to fill in for the elder Moseley, but attempts to find him a permanent placement within the parish were prevented by his continuing poor health.

=== Hartford years ===
Soon after Mariah's birth, the family moved to Hartford, CT. In 1797 Steward became a Deacon of the First Church of Hartford, a position he held until his death. In 1799, he joined with Reverends Nathan Strong and Abel Flint to compile a hymnal titled The Hartford Selection of Hymns. The book was very successful and went through eight editions by 1821.

He died on April 15, 1822, at the age of 69. He was survived by his wife Sarah and his daughters, Sarah and Anna. He is buried in the North Cemetery in Hartford, CT (Section F, Lot 452).

== Painter ==
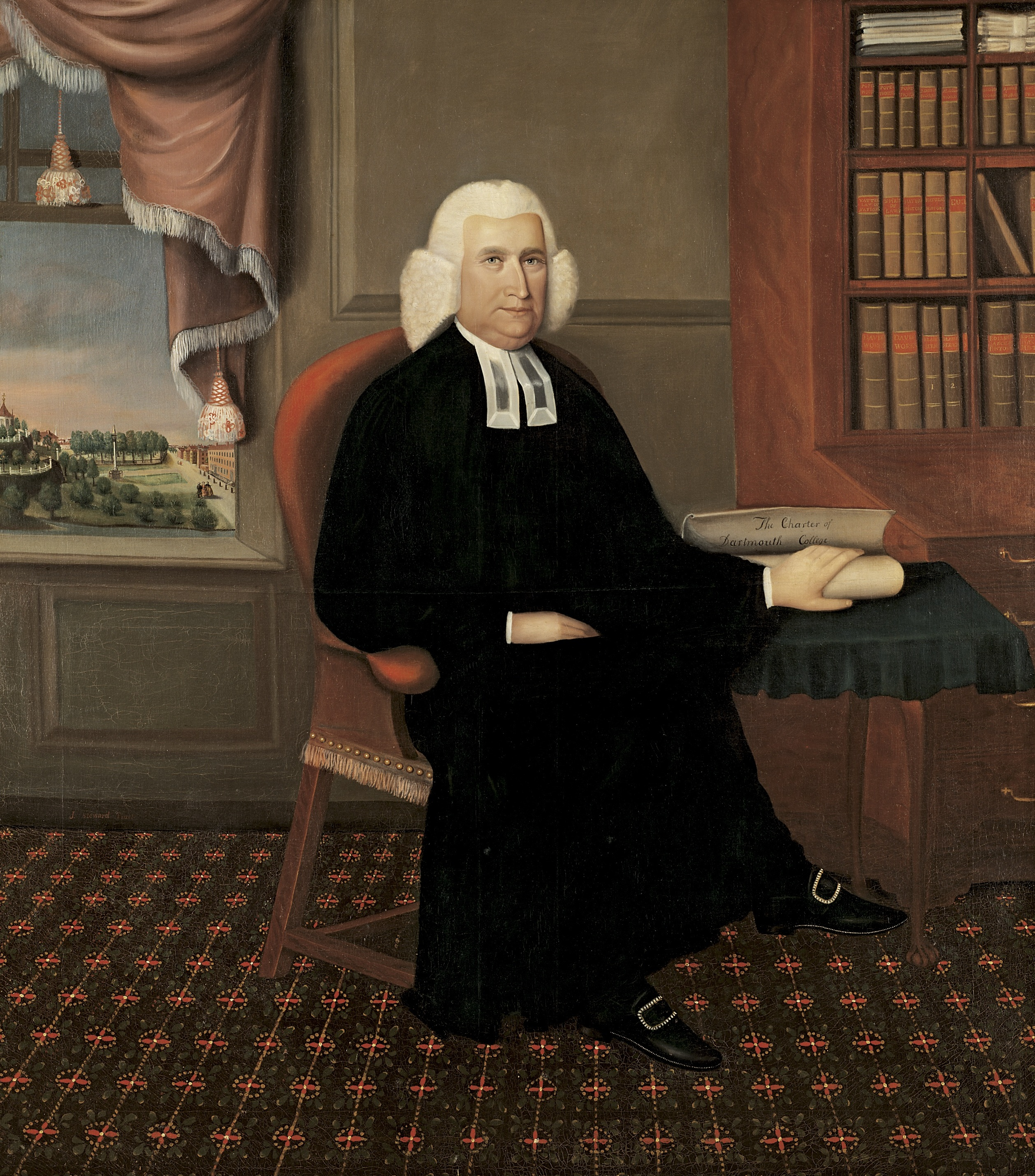
1793–1796 portrait of Eleazar Wheelock by Steward

Steward was a largely self-taught artist, although he may have studied with Jonathan Trumbull in the fall of 1792, during Trumbull's brief residency in Hartford. He was influenced by the painter Ralph Earl. Both were in Hartford at the same time, and knew many of the same people.

Steward is known to have been painting portraiture on a regular basis by 1788. He did not, however, always paint from life. There are many examples of him copying other works.

In 1793, he was commissioned by Dartmouth College to create full length portraits of John Phillips, a soon-to-be retired member of the college's board, and Eleazar Wheelock, the school's founder. The portraits were not completed until August 1796. This was his largest and best documented commission. That same year, he opened a “Painting Room" in the State House. The Connecticut General Assembly had given him permission to use a room in the newly completed capitol's third floor as a painting studio.

In 1795, he was in Stockbridge, Massachusetts, where he painted three members of the Sedgwick family, Theodore, his wife Pamela, and his daughter, the novelist Catharine Maria, as well as other inhabitants of the town. His portrait of John Bacon of Stockbridge, one of the original trustees of Williams College, is held by the art museum of that college.

Few of his works appear to be extant or available for public viewing, and many of those are only tentatively identified as his, based on style.

== Museum of Natural & Other Curiosities ==
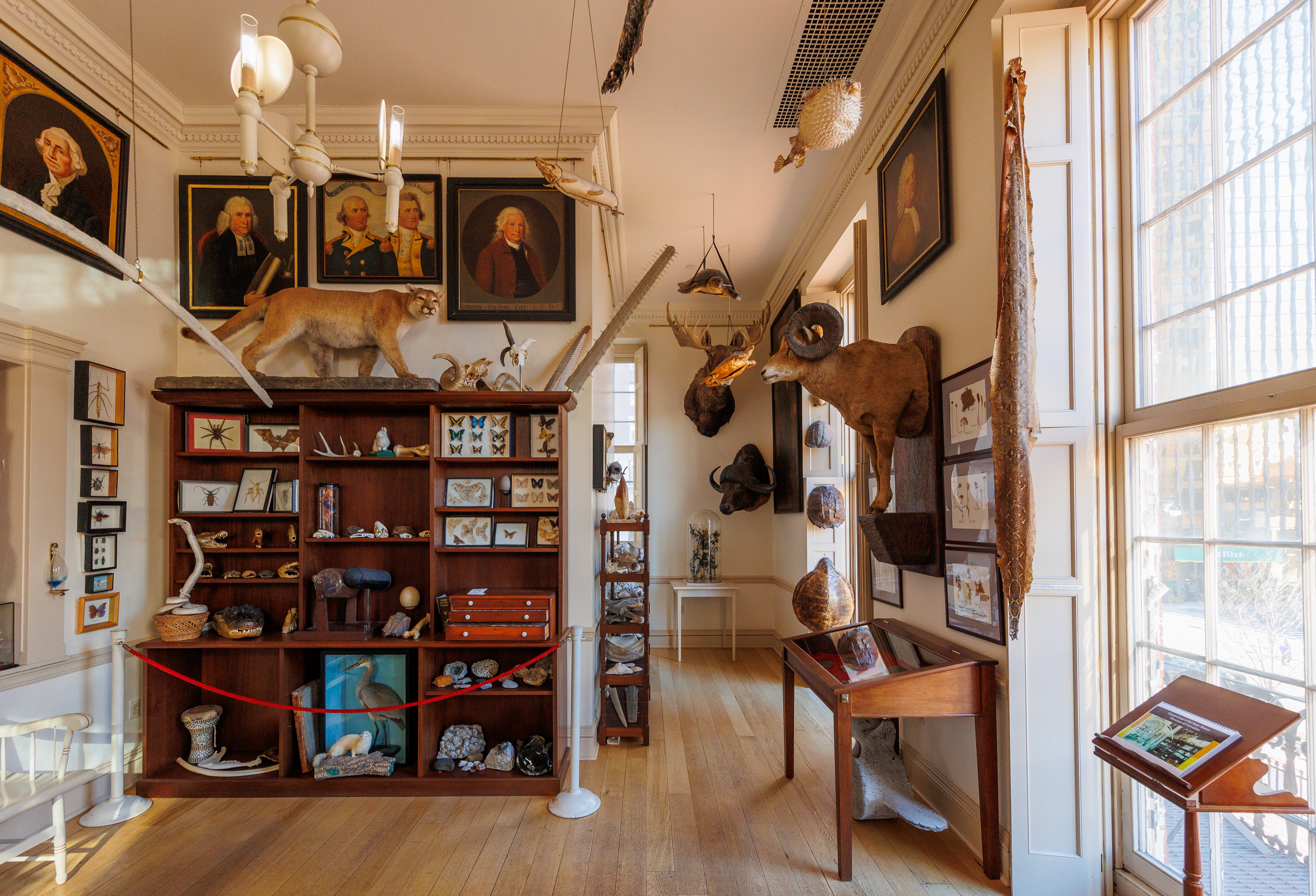
Stewart's Museum

In June 1797, he opened a museum in his Painting Room. He regularly used newspaper advertising to solicit donations for the museum, thank contributors, and promote his displays. His collection included portraits, wax works, and other curiosities, man-made as well as natural. His natural curiosities included a dwarf cow, a two-headed calf and a "sagacious" goat.

By 1808, his collection had outgrown the space available at the Old State House, so he acquired the Talcott Mansion, built in 1725 by Governor Joseph Talcott (1724-1741) and moved his museum there. It was open from 7 a.m. to 9 p.m. “except the evening before and after the sabbath”. The building stood until 1900 when the property was sold by the Moseley family and the building razed.

After Steward's death in 1822, the museum was relocated to 131 State Street, Hartford. It reopened in the new location on January 6, 1824, and Charles Dickerson became its proprietor. He was succeeded in 1832 by Caleb Wright. The collection remained intact until at least 1840. Some objects from the museum, including a number of portraits, were donated to the Connecticut Historical Society, which used them to recreate the museum at the Old State House.
