= Dartmouth College v. Woodward =

Trustees of Dartmouth College v. Woodward
- Supreme Court of the United States

Decided February 25, 1819
- Full case name: Trustees of Dartmouth College v. Woodward
- Citations: 17 U.S. 518 (more) 4 Wheat. 518; 4 L. Ed. 629
- Decision: Opinion

Case history
- Prior: Error to the New Hampshire Superior Court

Holding
- The charter granted by the British crown to the trustees of Dartmouth College, in New-Hampshire, in the year 1769, is a contract within the meaning of that clause of the constitution of the United States, (art. 1. s. 10.) which declares that no State shall make any law impairing the obligation of contracts. The charter was not dissolved by the revolution.

Court membership
- Chief Justice John Marshall Associate Justices Bushrod Washington · William Johnson; H. Brockholst Livingston · Thomas Todd; Gabriel Duvall · Joseph Story

Case opinions
- Majority: Marshall, joined by Johnson, Livingston
- Concurrence: Washington, joined by Livingston
- Concurrence: Story, joined by Livingston
- Dissent: Duvall
- Todd took no part in the consideration or decision of the case.

Laws applied
- U.S. Const. Art. 1, Sec. 10

Trustees of Dartmouth College v. Woodward, 17 U.S. (4 Wheat.) 518 (1819), often called simply The Dartmouth College Case, is a landmark decision in United States corporate law from the United States Supreme Court dealing with the application of the Contracts Clause of the United States Constitution to private corporations. The case arose when the president of Dartmouth College was deposed by its trustees, leading to the New Hampshire legislature attempting to force the college to become a public institution and thereby place the ability to appoint trustees in the hands of the governor of New Hampshire. The Supreme Court upheld the sanctity of the original charter of the college, which predated the creation of the State.

The decision settled the nature of public versus private charters and resulted in the rise of the American business corporation and the American free enterprise system.

== Background ==
In 1769, King George III of Great Britain granted a charter to Dartmouth College that spelled out the purpose of the school, set up the structure to govern it, and gave it land. In 1816, over 30 years after the conclusion of the American Revolution, the New Hampshire legislature altered Dartmouth's charter in order to reinstate the College's deposed president, place the ability to appoint positions in the hands of the governor, add new members to the board of trustees, and create a state-controlled board of visitors with veto power over trustee decisions. This effectively converted the school from a private to a public institution. The College's book of records, corporate seal, and other corporate property were removed. The trustees of the College objected and sought to have the actions of the legislature declared unconstitutional.

The trustees retained Dartmouth alumnus Daniel Webster, a New Hampshire lawyer who later became a U.S. Senator for Massachusetts and Secretary of State under Presidents William Henry Harrison, John Tyler, and Millard Fillmore. Webster argued the college's case against William H. Woodward, the state-approved secretary of the new board of trustees. Webster's speech in support of Dartmouth was reportedly so moving that it helped convince Chief Justice John Marshall and almost brought him to tears, according to attendee Chauncey A. Goodrich.

== Judgment ==
The decision, handed down on February 2, 1819, ruled in favor of the college and invalidated the act of the New Hampshire Legislature, which in turn allowed Dartmouth to continue as a private institution and take back its buildings, seal, and charter. The majority opinion of the court was written by Marshall.

The Court ruled that the college's corporate charter qualified as a contract between private parties, the King and the trustees, with which the legislature could not interfere. Even though the United States were no longer royal colonies, the contract was still valid because the Constitution said that a state could not pass laws to impair a contract. The fact that the government had commissioned the charter did not transform the school into a civil institution. Marshall's opinion emphasized that the term "contract" referred to transactions involving individual property rights, not to "the political relations between the government and its citizens."

All told, it was one of the longest sets of opinions in Supreme Court history up to that point.

== Significance ==
The decision was not without precedent; the Court had invalidated a state act in Fletcher v. Peck (1810), concluding that contracts, no matter how they were procured (in that case, a land contract had been illegally obtained), cannot be invalidated by state legislation. Fletcher was not a popular decision at the time, and a public outcry ensued. Thomas Jefferson's earlier commiseration with New Hampshire Governor William Plumer stated essentially that the earth belongs to the living. Popular opinion influenced some state courts and legislatures to declare that state governments had an absolute right to amend or repeal a corporate charter. The courts, however, have imposed limitations on this.

After the Dartmouth decision, many states wanted more control, so they passed laws or constitutional amendments giving themselves the general right to alter or revoke at will, which the courts found to be a valid reservation. But the courts had established that the alteration or revocation of private charters or laws authorizing private charters must be reasonable and cannot cause harm to the members (founders, stockholders, and the like).

The traditional view is that this case is one of the most important Supreme Court rulings, strengthening the Contracts Clause and limiting the power of the States to interfere with private charters, including those of commercial enterprises.

== See also ==
- Special district (United States)
- Pennsylvania College Cases 80 U.S. 190 (1871)
- Case of Sutton's Hospital (1612) 77 Eng Rep 960
- Phillips v Bury, 1 Ld Raym 5; 2 TR 346, Lord Holt
- Attorney-General v Pearce, 2 Atk 87, Lord Hardwicke
- John Wheelock
