= Doug Dohring =

American businessman (1957–2023)

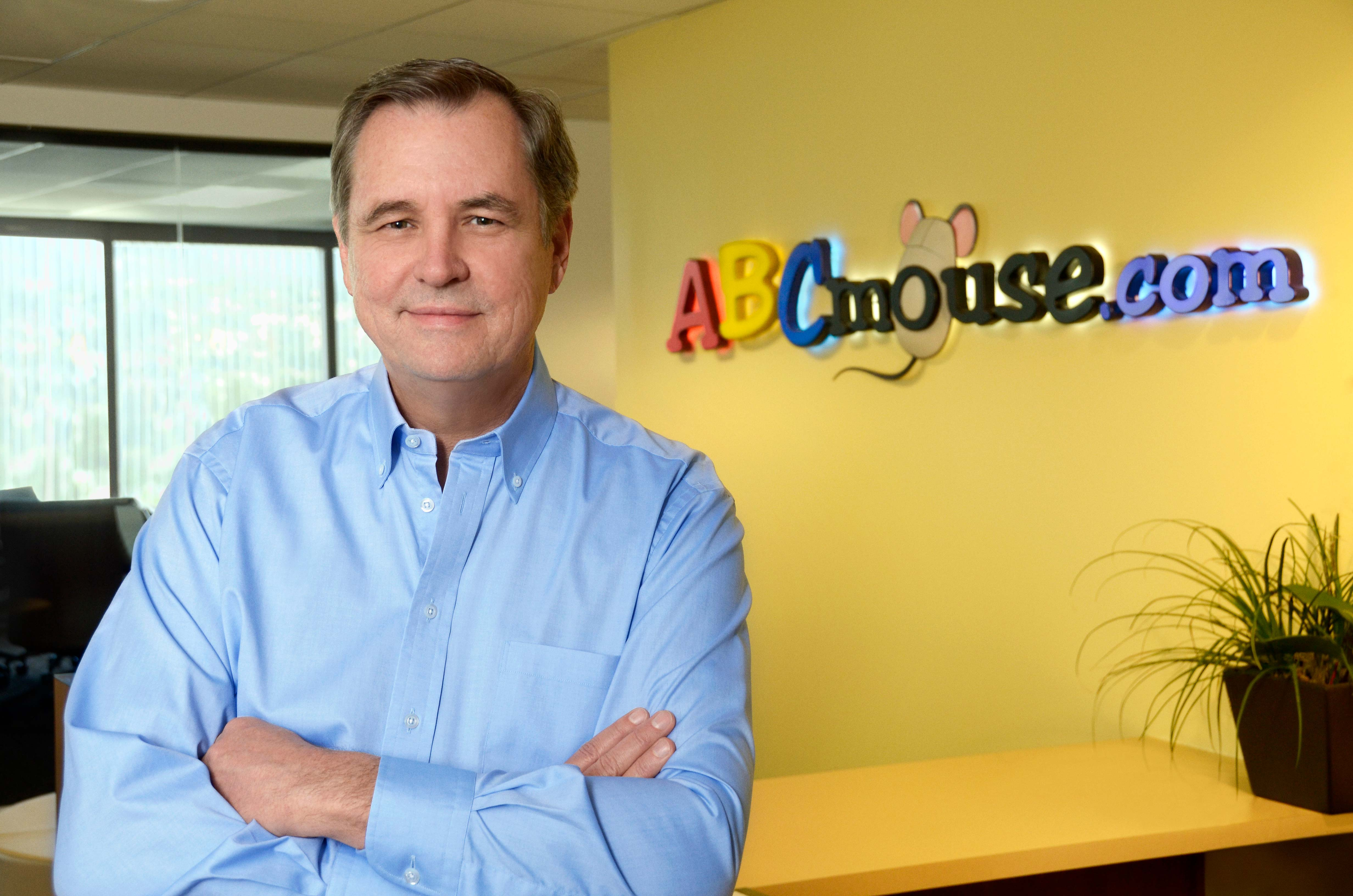
- Dohring at ABCmouse headquarters in 2011
- Born: 1957
- Died: September 14, 2023 (aged 65–66)
- Known for: ABCmouse
- Children: 5, including Jason

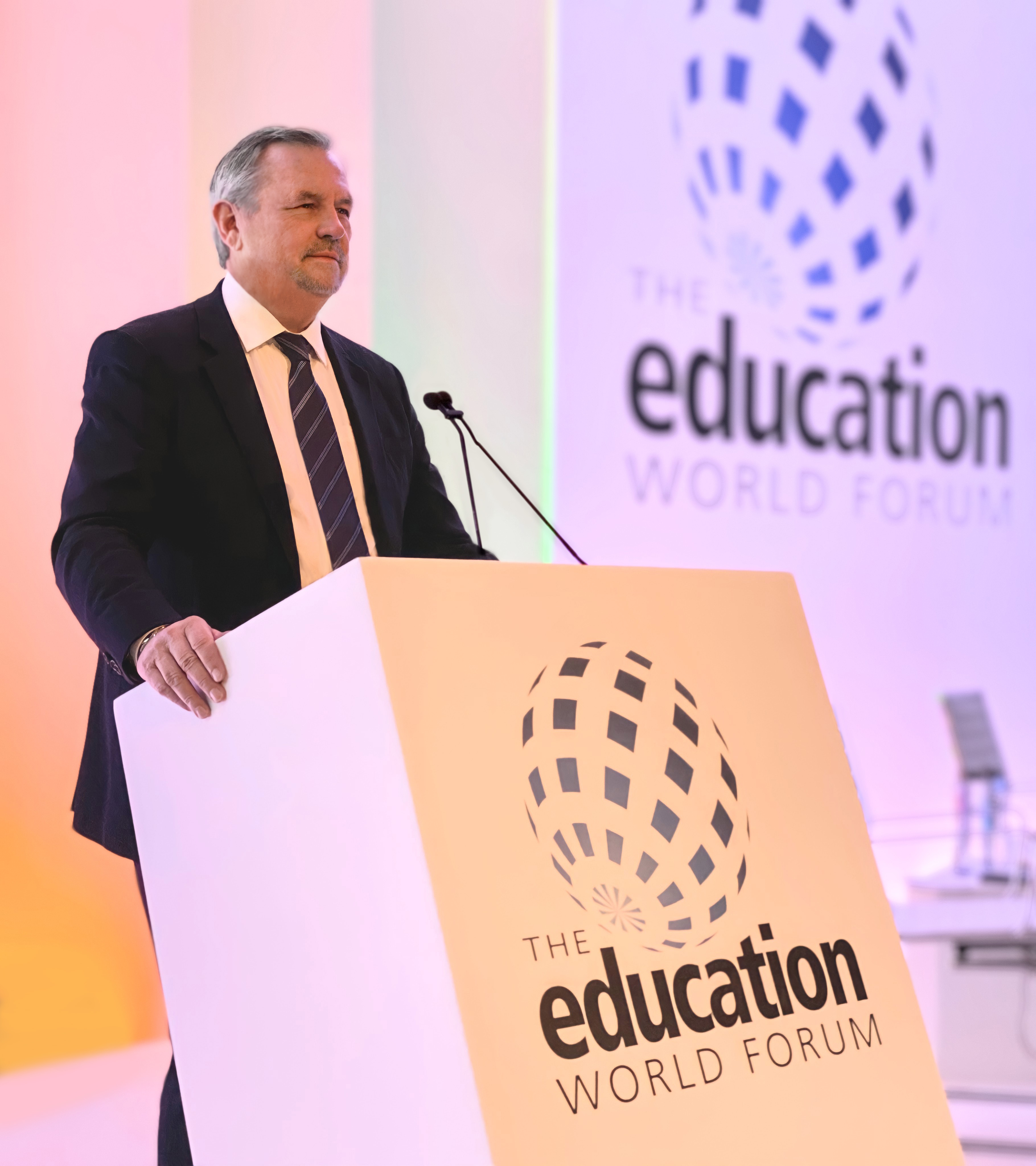
Dohring speaking at the Education World Forum in 2020

Doug Dohring (1957 – September 14, 2023) was an American marketer and entrepreneur. He founded the market research firm, The Dohring Company, in 1986. From 1999 to 2005, he was the CEO of Neopets, Inc. In 2007, he founded Age of Learning, Inc., an edtech company, and was CEO and executive chairman until his death. Dohring was also the chairman of the philanthropic Age of Learning Foundation, a member of the UNESCO Global Education Coalition.

== The Dohring Company ==
Dohring founded market research firm The Dohring Company in 1986, where he was chairman and CEO. Customers for the company's market research services included retail chains including Baskin-Robbins and House of Fabrics, and entertainment firms including Capitol Records, as well as automotive, financial services, and health care companies. Automotive surveys comprised up to 80% of the firm's business in 1995. At that time, the company was ranked 55th on the Advertising Age list of the nation's largest market research firms. It was 92nd on the Los Angeles Business Journal's 1995 list of fastest growing private companies in Los Angeles County.

== Neopets ==
Dohring founded Neopets, Inc. after being introduced to the Neopets.com site by a mutual friend upon its December, 1999 launch by two British college students, Adam Powell and Donna Williams. According to BusinessWeek, Dohring bought the site immediately thereafter. In April, 2000, he brought in his first advertising partners for a concept that he trademarked as immersive advertising.

According to a Harvard Business School case study, Neopets, Inc. had reached profitability four months after launching operations, "largely due to the fact that it spends nothing for customer acquisition, relying strictly on word-of-mouth."

Two years after its creation, in December 2001, Neopets had attracted more than 20 million accounts, more than 80% of them under the age of 17. While the "tech bubble" was bursting and large percentages of new websites were folding, Neopets was signing up 50,000 new accounts per day, with members spending an average of four hours or more per month on the site.

Dohring sold the Neopets site to Viacom's MTV Networks in June 2005 for $160 million. At the time, approximately 140 million Neopets had been created, with advertising making up about 60% of the company's revenues and a line of plush toys sold through Target Corporation and other stores.

== Age of Learning, Inc. and ABCmouse.com ==
After the sale of Neopets to Viacom in 2005, Dohring founded Age of Learning, Inc., in 2007, and launched the ABCmouse.com Early Learning Academy, website in 2010. The Wall Street Journal said that ABCmouse was "designed to teach basic reading, math, science and other subjects to children between the ages of two and six." Unlike Neopets, which relied on advertising, ABCmouse.com charges a subscription of $12.99 per month or $59.99 per year, and is free to individual teachers, libraries, Head Start programs, and other community organizations.

In 2016, Age of Learning launched ABCmouse for Schools, a service marketed to school districts and groups rather than families or individual teachers.

Age of Learning, a privately held company, was reported to have reached a $1 billion valuation based on $150 million in funding from ICONIQ Capital in May 2016. A subsequent round of funding in June 2021, led by TPG, raised another $300 million, which valued the company at $3 billion.

In September 2019, the company appointed former Disney executive Paul Candland as CEO with Dohring being named the Executive Chairman. Candland served as CEO until April, 2022 at which time Dohring resumed his position as CEO.

In January 2020, Dohring announced the formation of the Age of Learning Foundation, which offers free access to Age of Learning digital education programs, at the Education World Forum.

Age of Learning was named "Most Innovative Ed Tech Company" by SIIA in the 2023 CODiE Awards.

== Other business ventures ==
Dohring was also a principal shareholder in Speedyclick.com circa 1999–2001, which according to a December 2005 Wired Magazine article, "he later sold for $50 million." The $50 million deal included $3 million in cash and $47 million in ShopNow stock, (later renamed as "Network Commerce", and deemed worthless in 2001).

== Personal life ==
A California native, Dohring was the youngest son of a car dealer and a homemaker. He and his wife Laurie, both Scientologists, were married in 1979. They had five children including two sets of identical twins and actor Jason Dohring, best known for his roles in the series Veronica Mars and Moonlight.

Dohring died on September 14, 2023, due to an illness diagnosed four months prior.
