= Taco del Mar =

American fast food chain

TDM IP Holder, LLC.

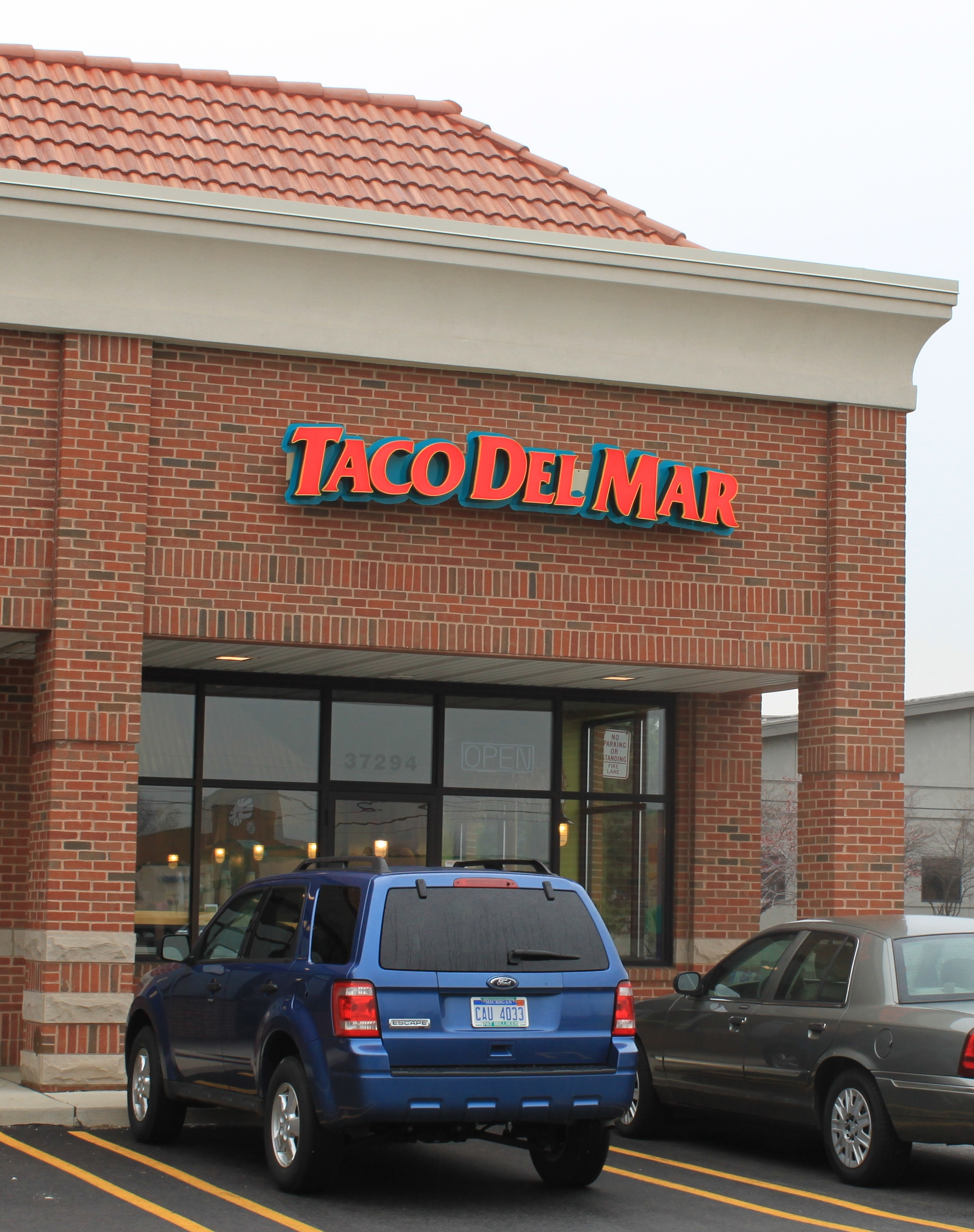
- Taco Del Mar shop in Livonia, Michigan
- Trade name: Taco del Mar
- Type: Private
- Industry: Restaurant
- Founded: June 8, 1992; 34 years ago in Seattle, Washington, U.S.
- Founder: James and John Schmidt
- Headquarters: Denver, Colorado, U.S.
- Number of locations: ▼66 (2022)
- Area served: United States and Canada
- Key people: Tim Casey (CEO)
- Products: Mexican cuisine
- Revenue: ▲US$29 million (2019)
- Owner: High Bluff Capital Partners
- Number of employees: 1,420 (2021)
- Parent: REGO Restaurant Group
- Website: www.tacodelmar.com

TDM IP Holder, LLC. , doing business as Taco Del Mar, is a Denver, Colorado-based Mexican fast casual restaurant chain that specializes in coastal Mexican cuisine. The first location was opened in Seattle on June 8, 1992, by brothers James and John Schmidt. After a high of 260 locations in 2010, it has fallen to 66 locations in the United States and Canada. It is known for its relaxed, seaside-themed decor inspired by the beaches of Baja California.

The name "Taco del Mar" ("taco of the sea" in English) refers to the chain's original specialty, Baja fish tacos. Like the larger Subway chain, customers direct the preparation of their meal, requesting ingredients along an assembly line. A standard selection of "Fresh Mex" ingredients is available, including wheat, flour, tomato and spinach tortillas, and fish, beef, pork and chicken.

In 2018, Taco Del Mar was acquired by High Bluff Capital Partners.

== Executive resignations ==
In November 2007, Taco del Mar Franchising Corp President David Huether resigned. Less than a month later, Neal Hollingsworth, Taco del Mar VP of Franchising Sales, also resigned and left the Seattle/Tacoma area.

== 2008 explosion in Vancouver ==
During the early morning hours of February 13, 2008, a Taco del Mar franchise in Vancouver, British Columbia, was destroyed by a large explosion that also damaged several nearby businesses. Police confirmed that the blast was caused by an arsonist who had placed an accelerant inside the restaurant, then set it on fire. Vancouver-area police later arrested Kamal Jeet Singh Josan, who was suffering from burns to over 40% of his body. The motive for the act was not publicly known. In April 2009, charges against Josan were stayed due to lack of evidence. Prosecutors took up the case again in January 2010, and Josan pleaded guilty to one charge of arson on March 14, 2011. He was sentenced to two years of house arrest on June 13, 2011.

== 2010 bankruptcy filing ==
On Friday, January 22, 2010, Taco del Mar filed for Chapter 11 bankruptcy protection in Seattle. Among its major creditors were Suzanne Todd, a franchisee in Maryland, with a disputed claim for $500,000; Paul & Shahnaz Hendifar, with a $125,416 judgment entered in Texas; Canada Revenue Agency, with a $105,324 tax claim, and the city of Seattle, with a tax $95,289 claim.

Taco del Mar was auctioned in a bankruptcy sale on September 30, 2010. The winning bid of $3.25 million came from Connecticut company Franchise Brands LLC. Franchise Brands was created in 2005 by Fred DeLuca and Peter Buck, the founders of Subway restaurants. Both Subway and Franchise Brands LLC are based in Milford, Connecticut.

On July 10, 2018, Taco del Mar was sold to High Bluff Capital Partners, the owners of Subway's longtime competitor Quiznos.
