= List of people from Camberley =

Notable people linked with Camberley, England include:

- Simone Ashley, actress known for appearing in Bridgerton and Sex Education
- 5ive, boy band 1997-2001; were the subject of the television programme Neighbours From Hell whilst living in Camberley
- Harold Balfour, 1st Baron Balfour of Inchrye airman and later politician; born in Camberley in 1897
- Darren Barnard, former professional footballer currently playing for Camberley Town F.C.; has also played for Wales
- David Blomfield MBE (1934–2016), leader of the Liberal Party group on Richmond upon Thames Council, writer, book editor and local historian, was born in Camberley.
- Rufus Brevett, former professional footballer currently sporting director of Swindon Town; assistant coach of Camberley Town F.C. at the start of the 2007/08 season
- Bros, late-1980s boy band, attended Collingwood school
- Sam Brown, 1990s pop singer
- Karina Bryant, British judoka
- Sharon Carr, Britain's youngest female murderer, killed a woman in Camberley in 1992 when aged 12
- Paul Darke, academic, artist and disability rights activist
- Hugh Edwards, actor, played Piggy in the first film of William Golding's Lord of the Flies
- Five Star, 1980s pop group, lived at Sunningdale
- Paul Gross, Canadian actor (Due South)
- Holly Hull, singer, winner of the Disney Channel UK singing competition My Camp Rock
- Hundred Reasons, alt rock band
- Camberley Kate, dog fancier and eccentric
- George Edward Lodge
- Helen Macdonald (born 1970), English writer and naturalist, best known as the author of H is for Hawk
- Brian McBride, President of the CBI
- The Members, punk rock band famous for the hit "Sound Of The Suburbs"
- Graham Parker, pop singer
- Olly Pearson, lead vocalist with doom metal band Moss
- John Pennycuick, engineer who built Mullai Periyar Dam widely admired in Tamil Nadu
- Adam Powell, co-founder of Neopets
- Andy Quin, composer and pianist
- Reuben, rock/metal band
- Tim Sills, professional footballer; started his career at Camberley Town FC, playing for various clubs including two spells at Aldershot Town; as of 2014 was still making his way around the lower leagues of English football
- Dame Ethel Smyth, composer and suffragette, lived as a child at Frimhurst, Frimley Green, and as an adult for some time on the Portsmouth Road, Camberley at the house that is now The One Oak Pub.
- David Speedie, played for Chelsea; lived in Camberley; was a member of Camberley working men's club
- Chris Stainton, session musician and member of the Eric Clapton touring band.
- Richard Stilgoe, lyricist and musician
- Arthur Sullivan, of Gilbert and Sullivan fame, started writing The Golden Legend whilst living in Camberley; the site of his house is now occupied by a McDonald's restaurant
- Benjamin Symons, guitarist in UK metal band Malefice
- Frederick Twort, English bacteriologist who undertook some of the earliest research on bacteriophage, was born in Camberley in 1877.
- Rick Wakeman, solo artist and ex-keyboard player with progressive rock band Yes
- Donna Williams, co-founder of Neopets
- Bruce Woolley, writer of "Video Killed the Radio Star"
- Dora Amy Elles, writer of novels under the pseudonym Patricia Wentworth
- Darren Turner, professional racing driver
