= Trevor Haynes (businessman) =

Australian businessman

- Education: Queensland University of Technology
- Title: President, North America Subway
- Term: November 2019-
- Predecessor: Suzanne Greco
- Successor: John Chidsey

Trevor Haynes is an Australian businessman, and president, North America of the Subway fast food chain. He was appointed acting CEO from June 2018 until November 2019, after Suzanne Greco retired. In November 2019, Subway named former Burger King chief executive John Chidsey as CEO.

== Early life ==
Haynes has a master's degree from the Queensland University of Technology.

== Career ==
Haynes joined Subway in 2006 as territory manager in Australia and moved to the UK in 2009 as senior area development manager for the UK and Ireland. In 2014, he moved to head office as global director of operations and head of business development.

In May 2018, Haynes became interim CEO, and acting CEO in June 2018, when Suzanne Greco retired.

In November 2019, Subway announced it has named former Burger King chief executive John Chidsey as CEO, and that Haynes's new role with the company will be president, North America.
