= Meteor Games =

Former gaming studio

- Type: Private
- Industry: Video games
- Founded: California, United States (2007)
- Founders: Adam Powell; Donna Powell
- Defunct: 27 January 2012
- Fate: bankrupted
- Headquarters: West Hollywood, California, United States
- Key people: Adam Powell (Chief Creative Officer); Donna Powell (CEO and COO); Barry Collier (Chief Technology Officer)
- Products: Serf Wars; Island Paradise; Ranch Town
- Number of employees: 100
- Website: meteorgames.com

Meteor Games was an independent online gaming studio formed in 2007 by Neopets founders Adam Powell and Donna Powell. It went bankrupt in 2012.

According to a statement released by the company, its games will "cross the appeal of social networks, web-based casual games and traditional massively multiplayer online games."

== History ==
Meteor Games' first project was the MMO Twin Skies, with the first public demo of the game being shown at the Penny Arcade Expo (PAX) in Seattle. The game was originally planned to be in 3D, but was later changed to become a 2D Flash game.

In the company's shift to social gaming, it released several games based on internal intellectual properties, including Island Paradise, Serf Wars, and Ranch Town.

=== Layoffs ===
In October 2011, 26 workers were laid off. At the end of November 2011, it was acknowledged that all but those related to maintenance of the remaining games run by Meteor Games on Facebook were being let go. On March or April 2012, the remainder of the Meteor Games staff were let go after Island Paradise was shut down around April. It was confirmed that then CEO Zac Brandenberg, who joined the company in 2010, had left in November, leaving Adam and Donna Powell to oversee the site. Sometime in either 2010 (around when Zac Brandenberg left) or early 2011, Adam also exited Meteor Games, which left Donna as sole COO and CEO of the company.

== Games ==
=== Twin Skies ===
Twin Skies was a planned flash game to be created through Meteor Games as their first gaming project. Initial response to the game's announcement at the 2008 Penny Arcade Expo was positive. Later reports stated that Meteor Games had scrapped plans to release the game as a MMOG, but moved to produce the game via flash due to economic issues. The move was met with disappointment by gaming websites such as Kotaku, who commented that it was "a pity" as the "original concept was extremely intriguing." Gameplay was initially planned to include several elements such as social interaction and mini-flash games that would have directly influenced the world in the Twin Skies MMO. Twin Skies was originally planned to enter beta testing in late 2008, with a projected full launch in 2009, but was cancelled due to massive layoffs at Meteor Games.

=== Serf Wars ===
Serf Wars, discontinued in early 2012, was a city-building game about developing a fantasy kingdom.

=== Island Paradise ===
Island Paradise was a social network-based application available on Facebook, where players create their own tropical island. Island Paradise was launched 25 August 2009. In November 2009, Island Paradise had roughly 6.8 million monthly active users. After two years the game continued to be a success. In the beginning of April 2012, the game went offline without any notice.

=== Ranch Town ===
Named one of the top gaining Facebook apps in early June 2010, Ranch Town was a farming sim set in the California gold rush era. It was discontinued in early 2012.

=== Neopets: Treasure Keepers ===
In conjunction with Neopets, Meteor developed a new game based in the world Adam and Donna first created, Neopia. Gameplay included quests on a board game-like map, selling items to NPCs in your shop, and earning achievements. These achievements sometimes come with a code for a free item on Neopets.

It was confirmed due to money losses and a plummet of users over the last few months along with laying off 90% of Meteor Games staff, Neopets: Treasure Keepers was shut down on Wednesday, 14 December 2011. Upon closing, users of the game were given a code to use on Neopets website for 10,000 in-game NP and 11 other virtual items.

=== Discontinued games ===
- Vikings, Pirates, and Ninjas
- My Sweet Shop
- Little Rock Pool
