= EzCater =

Boston-based company for corporate catering orders

ezCater
- Industry: Catering
- Founded: 2011
- Headquarters: Boston, Massachusetts
- Website: www.ezcater.com

ezCater is a Boston-based company that connects businesses with restaurants and caterers through an online marketplace. It was co-founded by Stefania Mallett, CEO, and Briscoe Rodgers, Chief Strategy Officer, in 2007.

== Method ==
With its online platform, ezCater connects corporate catering orderers and sales representatives with nearby restaurants and caterers.

It allows companies to review menus from restaurants and then place an order for meetings or company events. Restaurants are required to have the appropriate catering menus and web presence to join the platform. ezCater has over 75,000 restaurants and caterers signed up on its platform and its catering management software helps caterers manage orders and deliveries.

The website also stores receipts and order histories, and gives companies the ability to let others order food for clients and events with set maximum amounts and tipping policies. Once an order is placed, ezCater tracks it to be sure there are no issues.

== History ==
In 2011, Mallett and Rodgers raised $2.7 million in Series A investment. Seven years later, in 2018, the company raised $100 million. That funding round was led by Wellington Management Company, with existing investors such as ICONIQ Capital and Insight Venture Partners participating as well. This brought ezCater’s total funding to $170 million with a valuation of $700 million.

In 2017, ezCater partnered with JLL to provide meals to Feeding America. They've provided over a million meals to date.

In 2019, ezCater acquired Monkey Group, a cloud platform for take-out, delivery, and catering. That same year, a $150 million Series D-1 funding round saw ezCater reach a $1.25 billion valuation.

In April 2020, as the coronavirus pandemic shuttered corporate offices across the country, ezCater laid off over 400 staff across its Boston, Denver, Paris, and Vancouver offices.

During the pandemic in 2020, ezCater launched its app and website, Relish by ezCater, which allows workers to place food orders from local restaurants. The individually-packaged meals arrive in a designated space at a designated time to cut down on the number of delivery people entering a business.

In December 2020, ezCater partnered with Subway to offer a new online catering platform.

In July 2021, ezCater launched its first-ever TV commercials, advocating for food as an incentive to motivate remote workers to return to the on-site office environment after the pandemic.

In December 2021, ezCater announced a successful $100M Series D-2 funding round led by SoftBank, raising the company's post-money valuation to $1.6 billion.
