= Netshoes =

Brazilian e-commerce sporting goods conglomerate

Netshoes (Cayman) Limited
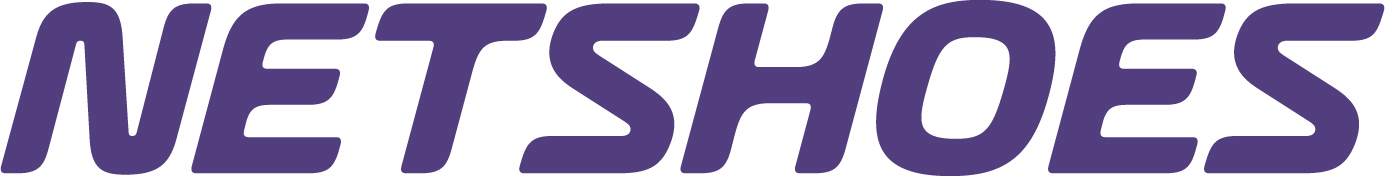
- Type: Subsidiary
- Industry: Online retailer
- Founded: 2000
- Headquarters: São Paulo, Brazil (operational); George Town, Cayman Islands (legal domicile)
- Area served: Brazil
- Key people: Marcio Kumruian, (CEO)
- Products: Sports Equipament, Shoes, Clothes
- Revenue: ▲US$ 570.2 million (2017)
- Net income: ▼ - US$ 51.3 million (2017)
- Parent: Magazine Luiza
- Subsidiaries: Zattini; Shoestock

Netshoes is a Brazilian e-commerce sporting goods conglomerate, established in February 2000 by Marcio Kumruian and Hagop Chabab. Netshoes maintains distribution centers in Brazil and manages the official stores of the Corinthians, São Paulo Futebol, Palmeiras, Cruzeiro, Clube de Regatas Vasco da Gama, Coritiba, Cruz Azul, Chivas, Monterrey, River Plate, San Lorenzo and América of México soccer clubs. It is also the official representative of the National Basketball Association (NBA) in Latin America and is responsible for the administration of online shops for the Puma, Havaianas, Globo Esporte, Oakley, Timberland, Topper, Mizuno and UFC trademarks.

== History ==
The first Netshoes shop was created by ethnic Armenian cousins Marcio Kumruian and Hagop Chabab in February 2000. The store was located across the street from Mackenzie University in São Paulo. In the following years, Netshoes opened affiliates at gyms and shopping malls in São Paulo. In 2002, the company began e-commerce operations and, in 2007, closed its 7 physical locations, migrating its business to online stores. Two years later, in 2009, Netshoes sponsored the Santo André soccer team in the Paulista Soccer Championship.

In the same year, the company launched a 3D scanner system, which was developed by engineers and athletes to make a 3D comparison between the model that interested the customer and the shoes the athlete wears. This system also allows the customer to determine, for example, the appropriate size based upon the model already used.

Two years later, Netshoes launched the mobile site so that its clients can make purchases via tablet and smartphone. And, in 2011, the company became an official partner of the NBA's 5x5 intercollegiate tournament in Brazil, sponsored the Cruzeiro and Santos teams and the Vôlei Futuro women's volleyball team, and began managing two online stores for Puma and the National Basketball Association (NBA) in Brazil.

The company was one of the official sponsors of the Novo Basquete Brasil [New Basketball Brazil] (NBB) championship for the 2011 and 2012 seasons.

Netshoes provided support to the 2º Circuito Infantil de Corridas contra o Câncer [2nd Youth Race against Cancer] in Rio de Janeiro and promoted the Netshoes Skate para Juventude [Skate for Youth] race in São Bernardo do Campo in 2012. In addition to sponsoring the race, Netshoes invited skater Sandro Soares, known as Testinha, to giving skating lessons to the children. That same year, the company partnered with Nike in the retail sale and distribution of products for players for the Bahia, Coritiba and Santos soccer teams.

The company received the Reclame Aqui award for Service Quality in 2012 and for The Best Companies for the Consumer in 2013.

Netshoes sponsored the Big Biker Cup, a Brazilian mountain biking championship in 2012 and 2013.

In 2013, the company launched a new online store for the National Football League (NFL), an American football league in the United States, partnered with the Brazilian Soccer Federation (CBF) to manage the entity's online store, was named one of the most innovative businesses in South America according to its Fast Company ranking and sponsored Ciclovia Musical, an event that unites 30 concerts with bicycle routes in the Barra Funda neighborhood in São Paulo. The company also sponsors the Clube de Ciclistas Sampa Bikers [Sampa Bikers Cycling Club].

In the same year, the company developed Netshoes Click, a mobile application for the iOS and Android operating systems, which identifies the tennis model from a photo of the product and also permits customers to purchase footwear by cellular phone. At the beginning of 2014, Netshoes changed its brand identity, modifying its logotype and visual and verbal identification. Changes were made to the call center, online store, packaging, ads, e-mails, and social media. This year, the company also celebrates 5 years of operations on social media, surpassing more than 100 thousand Twitter followers and 8.2 million Facebook fans.

Moreover, in 2014, the online store launched Netshoes APP in June, a mobile application for the iOS and Android operating systems that allows customers to make purchases online, pre-register using their credit card data for payment and view products that match their shopping or surfing profiles. The following month, in their first effort in support of a physical space related to culture, the Netshoes began its sponsorship of Teatro Folha.

In November 2014, Netshoes launched two brands of its own, Gonew and All4one. Gonew is focused on footwear, sportswear, bicycles and heart monitors for persons who are beginning to exercise, and All4one develops equipment for running, cycling and fitness that includes technology that calculates workout performance and intensity.

All4one launched a sports indicator application on the Android and iOS platforms in partnership with Carenet Longevity, a Brazilian company that develops exercise self-monitoring technology. The following month, in December 2014, the company launched Zattini, an online shoe, handbag and accessories shop.

Netshoes also manages the official stores of the Brazilian National Soccer team, the UFC, NBA, NFL, Oakley, Puma, Havaianas, Timberland, Topper, Mizuno and Globo Esporte, in addition to operating the official stores of soccer teams such as Corinthians, São Paulo, Palmeiras, Santos, Bahia, Cruzeiro, Coritiba, Vasco, Internacional, the Mexico national team, River Plate, Chivas, Pumas, Monterrey, San Lorenzo, Club América and Cruz Azul.

On March 16, 2017, Netshoes filed to raise up to $100 million in a U.S.-based public offering.

On April 29, 2019, Franca-based retailer Magazine Luiza announced its purchase of Netshoes. After several bids both from Magalu and from Grupo SBF (the parent company of competitor Centauro), Netshoes shareholders chose to accept the final offer from Magalu, which completed the purchase on June 14, 2019.

== Investors ==
Tiger Global, an American investment fund, invested in Netshoes in 2009 and 2011. In 2012, Netshoes received investments from ICONIQ Capital, an American investment fund and R$135 million from Temasek, a sovereign investment fund owned by the government of Singapore. The following year, Netshoes also received a contribution from Kaszek Ventures, an Argentine investment fund. The Government of Singapore Investment Corporation Private Limited (GIC), a Singaporean sovereign fund, also invested in the company, making a contribution of US$170 million in 2014. Currently, the company is a wholly owned subsidiary of Magazine Luiza.

== Operations ==
Netshoes owns five distribution centers, three of which are in Brazil, in the cities of Barueri, Itapevi and Recife, one in Argentina and one in Mexico.

In 2011, Netshoes began operations in Mexico and Argentina. The company manages online stores for the Mexico National Football Team, Monterrey, Chivas, América, Pumas, the NFL and Cruz Azul of México. In 2014, the company opened a new distribution center in Buenos Aires. In the same year, it launched River Plate's official store on its website and became a sponsor of the Argentine team.
