= Suzanne Greco =

American businesswoman

- Born: Suzanne DeLuca; 1957 or 1958 (age 67–68)
- Education: Sacred Heart University (BBA)
- Occupation: Businesswoman
- Title: Former president and CEO, Subway
- Term: 2015-2018
- Predecessor: Fred DeLuca
- Successor: Trevor Haynes
- Spouse: Gary Greco
- Relatives: Fred DeLuca (brother)

Suzanne Greco (née DeLuca, born 1957/58) is an American businesswoman who was the president and CEO of the Subway fast food chain from January 2015 to June 2018. She is the sister of Fred DeLuca, the co-founder of the company.

== Early life ==
She was born Suzanne DeLuca, the daughter of Salvatore DeLuca and Carmela DeLuca.

She has a bachelor's degree in business administration from Sacred Heart University.

== Career ==
Greco began working at Subway in 1973 and was running operations and research and development.

She is the sister of Fred DeLuca, the co-founder of Subway. She became the CEO of Subway in January 2015 when her brother was ill with leukemia (he died in September 2015). Greco stepped down as CEO on June 30, 2018, when she became a senior advisor to the company and was succeeded by Trevor Haynes as CEO.

== Personal life ==
She is married to Gary Greco, and they live in Woodbridge, Connecticut.
