= GreenSky =

American financial technology company

GreenSky, LLC
- Type: Private
- Traded as: Nasdaq: GSKY (2018–2022)
- Industry: Financial technology
- Founded: 2006; 20 years ago
- Founder: David Zalik
- Headquarters: Atlanta, Georgia, U.S.
- Area served: United States
- Key people: Ritesh Gupta (CEO)
- Revenue: ▼US$518 million (2021)
- Owner: Consortium led by Sixth Street Partners (2024–present)
- Number of employees: 992 (2021)
- Parent: Goldman Sachs (2022–2024)
- Website: greensky.com

GreenSky, LLC is an American financial technology company. Founded in 2006 and based in Atlanta, Georgia, it provides technology to banks and merchants to provide loans in the home improvement, solar, and healthcare sectors.

Financing for GreenSky credit programs is provided by federally-insured, federal and state-chartered financial institutions. From 2012 to 2016 nearly $5 billion had been lent through GreenSky credit program.

On March 15, 2024, it was announced that Goldman Sachs completed the sale of the firm to an investor group consisting of Sixth Street Partners, KKR, Bayview Asset Management and CardWorks.

== History ==
The firm was founded in 2006 by David Zalik.

In 2015, Greensky announced a multimillion-dollar expansion that would create 350 jobs in Atlanta, about one-third of which would be technology related.

In 2016, GreenSky raised $50 million in capital and established a $2 billion lending plan with Fifth Third Bancorp in Cincinnati, Ohio. The capital valued the firm at $3.6 billion, more than twice its valuation at the last fund-raising round for $300 million in 2014. Other investors from earlier rounds include TPG, Wellington Management, DST Global, ICONIQ Capital and QED Investors. In the same year, CEO David Zalik was presented with the National EY Entrepreneur of the Year Award in Financial Services.

On May 14, 2018, GreenSky set its IPO terms to 34.09 million shares at $21-$23. At 38 million sold shares, the IPO exceeded Greensky's target and raised $874 million for the company.

On September 15, 2021, it was announced that Goldman Sachs (GS) would buy the company in an all-stock deal that values Greensky at $2.24 billion. Reuters reported that the company's IPO in 2018 valued the company at about $4 billion. CNBC reported somebody bought several tens of thousands of call options the day before the takeover was announced for 5 cents an option, and that the $4,000 investment was now worth $2 million. CNBC also pointed out that normal daily option volume was less than 200 option contracts and their option analyst, Pete Najerian, said that "It doesn't smell right" and speculated that the trade would attract attention for possible insider trading.

In September 2021, GS announced to acquire GreenSky for about $2.24 billion. One year after completing its acquisition, making a loss and deciding to explore the sale of the company, GS reached a deal to sell GreenSky to a group of investment firms which includes Sixth Street Partners, KKR, and Bayview Asset Management in October 2023; the transaction was completed in 2024.

In June 2020, it reported the closing of an Incremental Term Loan B facility of $75 million, the proceeds of which would be used for general business purposes and to strengthen the overall liquidity structure of the company.

== Operations ==
GreenSky is less well known than other companies in the so-called fintech market such as SoFi or LendingClub, in part because it does not make loans using its own capital. GreenSky's partner banks—in 2016, they numbered 14 and included Regions Financial Corp. and SunTrust Banks—made loans online or through the GreenSky mobile app to customers of some 12,000 merchants ranging from retailers such as The Home Depot, Inc. to individual contractors. GreenSky signs up merchants who sell items, such as furniture and home improvement products, including window replacement, aluminum siding, and roofing. It also expanded to handle elective medical procedures.

The firm—and others like Affirm Inc., Klarna Inc. and Promise Financial Inc. -- essentially supplant credit cards for larger and more focused spending on consumer projects and then effect a fixed-period and fixed-interest-rate payback. Other competitors in the general market are Avant Inc. and On Deck Capital Inc; in solar, Mosaic Inc. and Spruce Finance Inc., backed by Kleiner Perkins Caufield & Byers. Describing GreenSky's whole business, CEO David Zalik said “We’re not competing with banks, and we’re not attempting to be a lender. We’re a technology company.” Its lending program is SSAE 16 Type II compliant.
