= ABCmouse =

Subscription based education program for children 2–8

ABCmouse.com
- Website type: Education
- Founded: 2010; 16 years ago
- Headquarters: Glendale, California, U.S.
- Area served: Worldwide
- Industry: Education
- Parent: Age of Learning, Inc.
- Website: www.abcmouse.com
- Advertising: Yes

ABCmouse.com, doing business as ABCmouse and previously known in full as ABCmouse.com Early Learning Academy, is a digital education program targeted towards children ages 2–8, created by the educational technology company Age of Learning, Inc. The program offers interactive educational content, including games, videos, and books covering multiple subjects.

In 2020, ABCmouse parent company Age of Learning, Inc., without admitting guilt, agreed to pay $10 million and settle a Federal Trade Commission complaint alleging that some of its past marketing and billing practices were unfair.

== History ==
Logo used from 2010 to 2020

ABCmouse.com is produced by Age of Learning, Inc., a privately owned education technology company currently led by CEO Alex Galvagni. Headquartered in Glendale, California, the company was founded in 2007 by Doug Dohring. Age of Learning launched ABCmouse.com in 2011 after three years of development, guided by a team of educators, and following testing by 10,000 families. The company has obtained several patents including the original patent for a vertically integrated educational system.

In 2014, at the White House Summit on Early Education, In 2015, the company partnered with another White House initiative, ConnectHome, to provide ABCmouse.com for free to families living in public housing in 27 cities and one tribal nation, serving up to 65,000 children.

In 2015, the company collaborated with the National Opinion Research Center at the University of Chicago to develop a series of web-based assessments. The Assessment Center includes over 8,500 items via 300 assessments.

In 2016, it was reported that Age of Learning raised $150 million from ICONIQ Capital, giving the company a $1 billion valuation. Age of Learning also launched ABCmouse for Schools in 2016; the enterprise-level solution won an ISTE Best of Show Award at the annual edtech conference.

In 2018, the company partnered with Tencent to launch the ABCmouse English Language Learning program in China.

In 2019, the company launched Adventure Academy, an educational app and game for children ages 8–13. It is an MMO with three-dimensional and multi-platform support, along with a core curriculum taught in schools and thousands of education activities.

In September 2020, the company agreed to settle a Federal Trade Commission complaint alleging that some of its past marketing and billing practices were unfair or deceptive. The complaint focused on the 2015 – 2018 time period and affected tens of thousands of consumers, which the company claimed to be less than 2% of ABCmouse subscribers. The company did not admit guilt but agreed to pay $10 million to settle the charges and avoid a prolonged legal dispute. They also agreed to much marketing, billing, and cancellation practices specified by the FTC, many of which the company claims had already been implemented years ago.

In June 2021, Age of Learning announced its new Schools Solutions Division and rollout of its first product offering, My Math Academy, a personalized, adaptive math program for pre-K through second grade, which has been tested in several school districts in the U.S. In January 2022, Age of Learning's Schools Solutions launched My Reading Academy, an adaptive game-based curriculum designed to help students in pre-k-2nd grade develop strong foundational reading skills.

On June 29, 2021, it was reported that Age of Learning closed a $300 million round of funding—led by TPG, along with the Qatar Investment Authority, Madrone Capital Partners, and Tencent Holdings Ltd.—which valued the company at $3 billion.

== Content and structure ==
ABCmouse.com Early Learning Academy content currently consists of more than 10,000 learning activities and 850 lessons. The preschool through second grade curriculum is laid out in a sequence called the "Step by Step Learning Path". The Learning Path is a multi-subject set of skills that are usually taught in school. Parents can register up to three children. Children can also use any of the content outside of the set learning path. Activities cover reading and writing, math, art, music, social studies, science, and health. There are also more than 1,000 digital books, including over 100 Stepped Readers. The same content is available whether children log on using their computer or mobile device (iOS, Android, Kindle).

Children navigate the site with the aid of "voice-overs, images, and text", but younger children may need help. Children earn tickets each time they complete a learning activity, which they can use to shop at virtual stores to "buy" pets, avatar items, room decorations, and more.

== Products ==
Age of Learning also launched ABCmouse Language Arts Animations, ABCmouse Mastering Math, ABCmouse Mathematics Animations, ABCmouse Science Animations, ABCmouse Music Videos, and ABCmouse Zoo apps in the same app stores. These apps can be used online or offline and are available to ABCmouse members.

As of 2016, ABCmouse for Teachers was used in more than 65,000 classrooms and ABCmouse for Libraries was available at one-third of U.S. public libraries, including all branches in Los Angeles, Chicago, Houston, and Brooklyn.

Some Age of Learning apps, such as its Aesop's Fables series and Beginning Reader series, have been discontinued and are instead available on the ABCmouse.com YouTube channel.

== Educational value ==
In 2017, a two-year longitudinal study published in the Journal of Applied Research on Children concluded that the use of ABCmouse Early Learning Academy improved school readiness and accelerated students’ learning gains in math and literacy skills. Several randomized controlled trials have been conducted on ABCmouse showing gains in reading and math.

A 2022 study in the Early Childhood Education Journal found that My Math Academy improved learning outcomes for kindergarten and first-grade students, with the greatest improvement found among children with lower initial math knowledge.
