= Neopets Trading Card Game =

Neopets card game

- Card back of Neopets TCG
- Designers: Mike Elliott, Skaff Elias, Andrew Finch, Bill Rose
- Publishers: Wizards of the Coast
- Players: 2
- Playing time: Approx 20 min
- Chance: Some (single dice rolls)
- Skills: Card playing Arithmetic; Basic Reading Ability

The 'Neopets TCG' is an out-of-print collectible card game and a spin-off of the popular virtual pet browser game, Neopets. The game was launched in 2003 and produced by Wizards of the Coast, a large trading card company that produces a variety of other trading card games. Neopets is aimed at a slightly younger audience than other Wizards of the Coast offerings such as Magic: The Gathering. As with many other trading card games, the cards serve two purposes, collecting and playing a game.

The card game was discontinued in 2006.

== Gameplay overview ==
Neopets TCG is a two-player game, where each player has a play deck of at least 40 cards and a separate deck of at least 10 Basic Neopets. Most deck-building articles suggest a limit of 2-3 species for the Basic Neopets, along with a minimum of 20 Item and/or Equipment cards (essentially half of the deck). Each card may have only 3 copies included. Players start with a single Neopet on the first turn, moving up to three by the third turn. These Neopets compete against opposing Neopets in four different arenas: Strength, Agility, Intelligence, and Magic. Winning a competition during a player's own turn allows the player to bank or draw a card; banking enough cards of sufficient value eventually leads to victory.

== Types of cards ==
The various Neopets cards are divided into categories that affect gameplay in different ways. The different card types are as follows:

- Basic Neopet
- Experienced Neopet
- Item
- Equipment
- Hero
- Villain
- Something Has Happened!
- Location
- Fate (Curse and Quest)
- Constellation

=== Basic Neopet (Yellow) ===
The Basic Neopet cards are the foundation of the game, and are based on the creatures from the Neopets website. The cards list four abilities or attributes, which are: strength, agility, intelligence, and magic. Each of these is given a value, with a higher number denoting a greater power or skill in a given category. Basic Neopets never have a printed score higher than 10, or lower than 1.

=== Experienced Neopet (Grey) ===
The Experienced Neopet is much like an evolved Pokémon in the Pokémon Trading Card Game. An Experienced Neopet has higher attributes, and often has helpful special abilities that influence various part of the game. The Experienced Neopet cards consist of both a Neopet species and an occupation, e.g. Jubjub Engineer. Only Neopets of the matching base species can transform into the Experienced Neopet role, so, for example, only a Jubjub could turn into a Jubjub Engineer, while a Mynci could not.

=== Hero & Villain (White, and Black) ===
Villain cards and Hero cards both have extremely high ability numbers, and are designed to oppose one another. If a villain is played, the arena in which the villain is located is effectively sealed off until the villain is confronted and beaten, until which point the players cannot start contests against their opponent in that arena, only the villain. A Hero card can be used to fight a difficult battle (often against a villain), but can be used only once before being discarded.

=== Item & Equipment (Red, and Blue) ===
Item and Equipment cards increase a Neopet's abilities, by adding points onto the printed base number in one or more categories, and frequently have special abilities that affect gameplay. Whereas Items can only be used once before being discarded, Equipment is attached to the Neopet and remains there until it is removed by another card. The advantage to Items is that they can be sprung upon an opponent unexpectedly.

Item and Equipment cards are also the only cards worth points, ranging from 0 to 8. A player must "bank" 21 points worth of Items and Equipment cards in order to win the game.

=== Something Has Happened! (Purple) ===
Something Has Happened! cards cause a one-time, instantaneous event or effect to occur. These cards often are used to influence the outcome of a battle, and are then discarded. Because one can discover that "Something has Happened!" at virtually any time, such cards can introduce a heavy element of surprise.

=== Location (Green) ===
Location cards can be played in one area to affect all future battles taking place there (until they get replaced by another Location). The Location can give an advantage to a certain kind of Neopet, or can cause some side effect to any battles occurring there. Location cards are typically based upon the fantasy locations of the Neopets website.

=== Fate (Orange) ===
Fate cards are divided into two sub-categories: Curse and Quest. Curses are usually placed on a Neopet belonging to the opponent, and have a negative or detrimental effect on that Neopet. Because Curse cards typically remain in play, they can cripple a given Neopet's ability to perform effectively. Quest cards affect all parts of the game, and are (usually) neutral.

=== Constellation (Dark Blue) ===
Constellation cards represent constellations in the sky which impact play in some way. For example, a given Constellation might confer an additional power to the Neopets in play, or otherwise might change the game in some fashion. Wizards of the Coast has not given any official rules regarding how constellation cards are to be played in the game, but popular rule sets online (most notably in player-created "guilds" on the Neopets website) considered them similar to Magic's enchantments and thus keep them in play when they are played.

== Expansions ==
The Neopets Trading Card Game has seen a series of expansions, with each release including new cards and in many cases, new categories of cards. Only three Neopets species did not make it into the TCG, as produced by Wizards of the Coast: Gnorbu, Ogrin, and Xweetok. Checklists can be accessed if players have a Neopets user account.

=== Base set ===
The first Neopets card set was simply an introductory 234-card set, with no prevailing theme whatsoever. This set introduced the card types Basic Neopet, Experienced Neopet, Hero, Villain, Item, Equipment, and "Something Has Happened!". The Basic Neopet types that were introduced were Aishas, Korbats, Myncis, Scorchios, Shoyrus, Kacheeks, Acaras, Lupes, Wockies, Poogles, Eyries, and Grarrls.

=== Battle For Meridell ===
This expansion's release was coordinated with an online plot/war, which was set in the virtual feudal-themed land of Meridell. Thus, the 140 cards in this set were designed with a Middle Ages-like style. This expansion introduced ten new species of Neopets, (Basic Type: Blumaroo, Draik, Gelert, Ixi, Meerca, Quiggle, Skeith, Uni, Usul, and Zafara) in addition to the Location card type.

=== The Return of Dr. Sloth ===
Intending to be tied into an online plot, this set was released in 2004 & the online tie-in was delayed until early 2008 due to workload. This set totaled 100 cards. This expansion's theme was space, providing players with futuristic and robotic items and equipment. Six new Neopet species made their debut in this expansion (Basic Type: Cybunny, Grundo, Jetsam, Jubjub, and Kougra).

=== Mystery Island ===
Based upon a tropical island locale, this 100-card expansion provided no new card types, but did introduce four new Neopet species, including the Pteri and Techo (other Basic Type: Krawk and Peophin). The related plot was the Secret of the Volcano mystery plot in Fall 2003, but the plot and the expansion were not released together.

=== Hannah and the Ice Caves ===
Revolving around a central popular game character known as Hannah the Usul, a substantial plot was released on the Neopets website along with this 150-card set; it was also the first set to have "secret" cards (5 Jelly cards 151/150-Jelly Poogle, 152/150-Jelly Shoyru, 153/150-Jelly World, 154/150-Jelly Puppyblew, and 155/150-Orange Jelly). The locale for this expansion, released in October 2004, was a wintry, icy environment. A game is also based upon the plot of this expansion of the same name, and is currently online at the Neopets website. This expansion introduced the Basic Neopets known as the Bori, and the Bruce (other Basic Type: Elephante, Flotsam, Kyrii, and Moehog). One new card type was released: Fates.

=== Curse of Maraqua ===
This 120-card expansion revolved around the underwater city of Maraqua, which was rebuilt during the plot of the same name on the Neopets website. Four new Neopet species were released with this set, including the Yurble (other Basic Type: Chomby, Lenny, and Tuskaninny).

=== Lost Desert ===
This 100-card expansion took players to the shifting sands of the Lost Desert. Basic Neopets released in this expansion are the Ruki, the Kau, and the Tonu. Site-wise, there was a plot and war revolving around this expansion.

=== The Darkest Faerie ===
This 150-card expansion (with 5 secret cards) featured several cards relating to the PlayStation 2 game, including several familiar characters from previous sets. The most notable of these were the Darkest Faerie, the Dark Faerie Sisters, and the Werelupe King. This expansion also introduced another new type of card, the Constellation (Basic Type: Buzz, Koi, and Nimmo). Oddly, this expansion was absent of any Fates.

Secret cards: 151- Amulet of Thilg, 152- Bewitched Ring, 153- Fyora, Tower Guardian, 154- The Hidden Tower, 155- Wand of Ultanova.

=== Travels in Neopia ===
This Neopets card expansion is actually a re-packaging of 200 cards from previous card sets. This includes favorite cards, as well as Neopets from each and every known Neopet species; 3 exceptions from the list of 54- Gnorbu, Ogrin, and Xweetok (introduced Basic Type: Hissi, Kiko, and Lutari). Only one color for each Basic species was included. The general theme of this set is about encouraging fans to re-live past plots, or, for those new to Neopets, catch up to them with some of the more well-known aspects of the series. There was barely any publicity at all related to this expansion.

=== The Haunted Woods ===
The newest expansion, featuring 100 cards with a spooky theme. Cards are related to ghosts, werewolves, and zombies, among others. This deck is associated with the plot, Tale of Woe; where a village has fallen under a curse, and only the Neopets can determine what happened to the townsfolk. There are no new Basic Type cards, although they did fill out the basic 4 colors for the Lenny and Tonu. Special color versions are included for Acara, Aisha, Cybunny, and Korbat. As with previous recent releases, this release appears to be been done with a minimum amount of publicity. This is the last expansion produced by Wizards of the Coast.

== Hubrid's Hero Heist ==
A game was created to tie in with the TCG, and it was named Hubrid's Hero Heist. It features several Neopian heroes being captured by Hubrid Nox and the player, as the Poogle Apprentice, is tasked to save these heroes. The heroes which the player saves are, in order of saving, Magnus the Torch, Jeran, Master Vex, Illusen, Jerdana, and finally, Fyora the Faerie Queen.

== Call to Arms Revival ==
Call to Arms, a yearly gaming convention in Virginia, has started hosting unofficial tournaments as of 2025. Using the community-led Reddit page and Discord server as advertisement, the 2025 and 2026 tournaments both had 8 competitors, with many more interested in coming out for later events. The winners of these tournaments claim the unofficial World Champion title.

- 2025 World Champion: Raffi Grinberg
- 2026 World Champion: Judah Grinberg

Thanks to the success from Call to Arms, a website has also been made to document the tournaments, as well as showcase decks and provide resources for people wanting to play or collect.
