= Adam Powell (game designer) =

Welsh programmer, founder of Neopets

- Born: Adam James Powell; 20 December 1976 (age 49); Newport, Wales
- Occupation: Game designer
- Spouse: Donna Powell

Adam James Powell (born 20 December 1976) is a Welsh computer programmer, game designer and businessman. He is the co-founder of Neopets and Meteor Games.

== Education ==
Powell attended the University of Nottingham from 1995 to 1998 studying for a computer science degree. While at Nottingham, Powell (known as "Jander" at the time) and a user known as "Myurr" coded a DikuMUD-based MUD titled Dark Heart.

== Career ==
Before Neopets, Powell founded various companies. In 1997 he started Shout! Advertising, which went on to be acquired by ValueClick, Inc. in 2000. In 1999 he founded Netmagic and Powlex, which were online companies for online banner advertising and web page design, respectively.

=== Neopets ===
Powell first had the idea of Neopets in 1997, while studying at the University of Nottingham. He and Donna Powell (formerly Donna Williams) started programming the site in September 1999, and launched the site two months later on 15 November 1999. Powell programmed the entire site, and created most of the original activities and games.

In April 2000, Powell negotiated a significant investment in Neopets.com and transferred the company from the UK to Los Angeles, US. After the relocation, Powell remained on staff as creative director and technical lead. Under Powell's management, Neopets went from its initial launch to over 140 million accounts and 5 billion pageviews per month. On 20 June 2005, Viacom bought Neopets, Inc. for US$160 million.

Powell continued to work for Neopets.com until June 2007, aiding the transition following the purchase and continuing to develop high-end concepts for the site.

Powell has creative design and writing credits on a wide variety of Neopets products including SCEA's 2006 PlayStation Portable release Neopets: Petpet Adventures: The Wand of Wishing, Wizards of the Coast September 2003 release the Neopets Trading Card Game and Sony Computer Entertainment America Inc's 2005 release Neopets: The Darkest Faerie, for the PlayStation 2.

=== Meteor Games ===
In 2007, Adam and Donna Powell founded Meteor Games, an independent online gaming studio committed to developing immersive and innovative games spanning the web, social networks, and mobile devices. Meteor Games was headquartered in Los Angeles, and had 100 employees by 2010, including a former Neopets developer named Ollie, also known as "TPOSG" ("The Phantom Orange Shirt Guy").

Meteor Games' first project was Twin Skies, a 3D MMO that blended casual gaming and social networking elements with traditional massively multiplayer online role-playing games. Meteor Games released their first web-based game Vikings, Pirates and Ninjas in March 2009. The game was free to play on the web and Facebook.

In the company's shift to the rapidly growing social gaming market it released several games and apps primarily for Facebook, including Island Paradise, Serf Wars, and Ranch Town. As of an interview with the CEO in February 2011, Meteor Games hadn't raised any venture capital but "was profitable".

Late in December 2011, Meteor Games laid off 90% of its staff, shut down the Viacom-backed game Treasure Keepers, and subsequently wound down all operations.

=== Moglings ===
Around June 2013, Adam stated that he, Donna, and TPOSG would be making a new game. In May 2014 Donna hosted an AMA on the Neopets subreddit, in which she revealed that the project's working title was Moglings. On September 22, 2014, Adam stated in a post to the Moglings subreddit that the project would be suspended for some time, perhaps to be taken up again in early 2016.
