= Peter Buck (restaurateur) =

American physicist, restaurateur, and philanthropist (1930–2021)

- Born: December 19, 1930; South Portland, Maine, U.S.
- Died: November 18, 2021 (aged 90); Danbury, Connecticut, U.S.
- Education: Bowdoin College (BS); Columbia University (MS, PhD)
- Occupations: Businessman; Co-founder of Subway

Peter Buck (December 19, 1930 – November 18, 2021) was an American restaurateur, philanthropist, and physicist who co-founded the Subway fast-food restaurant chain alongside Fred DeLuca.

== Early life and education ==
Buck was born on December 19, 1930, to Ervin and Lillian Bernice "Molly" (Draper) Buck, who owned a farm in South Portland, Maine. He had a younger brother named David. He and his brother grew up and worked on his parents' farm. He graduated from South Portland High School in 1948. He graduated from Bowdoin College in Brunswick, Maine, in 1952. He then earned master's and doctoral degrees in physics at Columbia University.

== Career ==
In 1957, Buck went to work for General Electric at the Knolls Atomic Power Laboratory in Schenectady, New York. There, he performed tests and calculations on atomic power plants being developed for U.S. Navy submarines and surface ships. In 1965, he joined United Nuclear, in White Plains, New York, calculating the power distribution and refueling requirements of nuclear power plants. He finished his physicist career at Nuclear Energy Services in Danbury, Connecticut.

Buck loaned partner and family friend Fred DeLuca $1,000 in 1965 and advised him to open a sandwich shop to help him pay for college at the University of Bridgeport in Bridgeport, Connecticut. They named the restaurant after Buck, calling it "Pete's Super Submarines". Together Buck and DeLuca formed "Doctor's Associates" to oversee operations as the restaurant business expanded. Though neither the first nor the second restaurants were financial successes, they continued to expand their operations. By 1973, they had 16 locations throughout Connecticut and, in 1974, they began franchising out the restaurants. They also introduced a new logo and changed the name of their operation from what was then "Pete's Subway" to "Subway Sandwiches".

Subway continued to grow over the ensuing years and by 2010 became the largest fast food chain worldwide, with 33,749 restaurants. In 2015, Buck was ranked No. 261 on the Forbes 400 list of wealthiest people, with an estimated net worth of $1.6 billion.

== Philanthropy, honors, and awards ==
=== Peter and Carmen Lucia Buck Foundation ===
In 1999, Peter Buck and his wife Carmen Lucia Buck established the Peter and Carmen Lucia Buck Foundation (PCLB) as a private family foundation to manage their philanthropic initiatives. The foundation's mission is to "give motivated people the tools they need to help themselves," supporting causes such as education, journalism, medicine, and land conservation.

In 2009, the Carmen Lucia Foundation was created, supported by the PCLB, as a complementary arm specifically focused on the social and economic empowerment of underserved communities. The foundation honors the legacy and humanitarian commitment of Carmen Lucia Buck and is notable for its direct involvement in initiatives related to basic education, preventive healthcare, and community development. Its creation significantly expanded the scope and impact of the Buck family’s philanthropic efforts.

In 2023, it was announced that Buck had bequeathed his 50% stake in Subway to the foundation, a gift estimated to be worth approximately $5 billion based on Subway's potential sale value. This donation is among the largest single contributions to a charitable foundation in a single year.

The Buck family, which includes some of Maine's largest landowners with over 1.3 million acres of timberland held through the Tall Timbers Trust, has been a significant benefactor to the foundation. As of 2023, it is estimated that they have donated over $580 million to the foundation since its inception.

The Internet Archive received support from PCLB.

=== Donation to Smithsonian ===
Buck personally made major donations to the Smithsonian Institution, where he served as a trustee of the National Museum of Natural History, including the 23.10 carat Carmen Lúcia Ruby, given to the museum's gem collection. It is thought to be one of the finest Burmese rubies known. Curator Jeffrey Post called the gem “the most important addition to the collection in the 20 years that I’ve been here.”

=== Doctorate ===
In 2008, Bowdoin College awarded Buck an honorary Doctor of Humane Letters degree. He gave a grant to Bowdoin College in 2009 that completed its capital campaign. Consequently, the college's new fitness center bears his name.

=== Local philanthropy ===
In 2014 Buck gave $30 million to Danbury Hospital towards a new addition.

As of 2020, Buck was the seventh-largest landowner in the United States by acreage, according to landreport.com, acquiring land for the purpose of open space conservation.

== Personal life ==
Buck married Haydee Piñero in 1955, whose father Jesús T. Piñero was the first native governor of Puerto Rico. They had three children together: Christopher, Kenneth and Cynthia (Kenneth and Cynthia predeceased him). The marriage ended in divorce. He later married Carmen Lúcia Passagem. They had a son together, William. They were married over 20 years when she died in 2003.

Buck had a lifelong interest in aviation. For many years he owned and piloted a glider and remained an active member and supporter of the Soaring Society of America and the Valley Soaring Club.

Buck was a long-time resident of Danbury, Connecticut. He died in Danbury on November 18, 2021, at age 90.

== See also ==
- Fred DeLuca
