= Donna Powell =

British game designer and businesswoman (born 1978)

- Born: Donna Williams; 10 December 1978 (age 47)
- Education: University of Nottingham
- Occupation: Game designer
- Known for: Neopets; Meteor Games
- Spouse: Adam Powell

Donna Williams Powell (born 10 December 1978) is a British game designer and businesswoman. She is the co-founder of Neopets and Meteor Games.

== Biography ==
Williams-Powell grew up in Surrey where she met business partner and then-boyfriend Adam Powell while they were high school students. Williams-Powell attended the University of Nottingham and from September 1997 to July 1999 she ran marketing and web design for Powell's company Shout! Advertising, which operated the third largest click-through program on the Internet by mid-1999. From July 1999 to early 2000, she worked at Speedyclick.com, handling website development and Internet advertising services.

=== Neopets ===
In September 1999, Williams-Powell created Neopets with Powell. She led site management and operations, which included content planning and game design but later expanded to include managing product promotions and licensing. She expanded Neopets into previously-untapped offline markets, including console games, soft toys, fast-food promotions and collectible card games. In 2003, she helped establish the partnership with Beckett Media to publish the bi-monthly Neopets: The Official Magazine. Under Williams-Powell's management and product expansion, Neopets went from its initial launch to over 140 million accounts and 5 billion pageviews per month, and in 2005 was sold to Viacom for US$160 million.

=== Meteor Games ===
In 2008, she and Powell launched Meteor Games, an independent game studio in West Hollywood, California. Meteor Games' first project was Twin Skies, with the first public demo of the game being shown at the Penny Arcade Expo (PAX) in Seattle. The game was originally planned to be in 3D, but was later changed to become a 2D Flash game. In December 2011, Meteor Games laid off 90% of its staff, shut down the Viacom-backed game Treasure Keepers, and subsequently wound down all operations.

== Personal life ==
Williams-Powell married Adam Powell in 2008.
