= Neopets: The Darkest Faerie =

2005 video game

- North American box art
- Developer: Idol Minds (Note: Santa Monica Studio assisted in development.)
- Publisher: Sony Computer Entertainment America
- Directors: John Hight; Allan Becker; Jon Steele
- Producers: Jacob R. Buchert III; Doug Dohring; Lee Borth
- Designers: R. Scott Campbell; George Weising; Bo Kinloch
- Programmer: Jim Mooney
- Artists: Peter Walters; Andy Meier; Shaddy Safadi
- Composers: Jack Wall; Keith Leary
- Platform: PlayStation 2
- Release: NA: November 15, 2005
- Genre: Action-adventure
- Mode: Single player

Neopets: The Darkest Faerie is a 2005 action-adventure game developed by Idol Minds and published by Sony Computer Entertainment for the PlayStation 2. It was only released in North America and is a spin-off of the browser game Neopets.

Neopets: The Darkest Faerie has received mixed critical reviews.

== Plot ==
Neopets: The Darkest Faerie is set in "Neopia", the land of the Neopets universe, which is inhabited by anthropomorphic versions of Neopets species. The plot is based on a story written by Neopets founder Adam Powell.

A long time ago, the Faerie queen Fyora imprisoned a dark faerie at the bottom of the Maraquan Sea as punishment for attempting to take over the realm, with her name erased from history and being remembered only as 'the Darkest Faerie'. However, after a thousand years, the spell imprisoning her has weakened and breaks, and she escapes, returning to the surface intent on conquering the realm of Neopia and exacting revenge upon Fyora.

The game begins with Tormund Ellis (nicknamed "Tor"), a young restless Lupe farm boy who dreams of being a knight in the city of Meridell. After being accepted into the ranks and training under the discipline of the castle's master-at-arms, Torak, Tormund is knighted after saving the neighboring village of Cogham from The Ixi Raiders. Afterwards, while answering a plea to defend the nearby forest glade of Illusen the Earth Faerie from an invading tribe of Werelupes, the mission fails, and Tormund returns to Meridell to discover it and its inhabitants have fallen under a cloud of dark magic and the control of the Darkest Faerie. Though unaffected himself, the Faerie's minions drive him out of the castle and city.

Meanwhile, the neighboring kingdom of Brightvale notices the dark clouds and sends a diplomatic envoy to the city of Faerieland, home of Fyora, to investigate, including Roberta, a young Acara who is the niece of Brightvale's king Hagan. That night, the Darkest Faerie attacks Faerieland, capturing Queen Fyora and covering the castle in a dark aura. Roberta escapes, but is pursued by monsters and falls to the countryside of Neopia below.

Roberta and Tormund meet and go to warn King Hagan about the Darkest Faerie. It is revealed that they were given amulets to protect them against the Darkest Faerie's power. Upon research, they discover that Fyora's magical rod was used to seal her away and is now lying deep underneath the city of Meridell. After freeing the neighboring regions from the control of dark magic, they infiltrate the castle of Meridell and head deep underground to recover Fyora's ancient wand. With its power, they drive the darkness out of the city and return to Faerieland to stop the Darkest Faerie. However, it turns out to be a trap, as the Darkest Faerie seizes the rod and a fight between her and Fyora ensues. Fyora teleports Tormund and Roberta to safety before being captured.

Tor and Roberta awaken to find themselves in the lost Kingdom of Altador, which was thought to have been destroyed by the Darkest Faerie one thousand years ago. Through research, they learn that the Darkest Faerie was one of the Kingdom's founders who later betrayed them, and that her spell can be broken by awakening the other founders, known as "The Protectors". After awakening the Protectors and restoring the kingdom to Neopia, the sorceress Jerdana gives them the same orb that Fyora used to imprison the Darkest Faerie in the ocean, and opens a portal for them to return to Faerieland, where they have a final confrontation with the Darkest Faerie.

Tormund and Roberta defeat the Darkest Faerie and imprison her once again with Jerdana's Orb, then free Fyora and retrieve the Rod. Fyora uses the Rod to stop Faerieland's descent just before it impacts Meridell and returns it to the sky. Tormund and Roberta are hailed as heroes, When Roberta asks Fyora what became of the Darkest Faerie, Queen Fyora replies "Don't worry. She's been placed somewhere we can keep a close eye on her.” The Darkest Faerie is then seen as a statue on a fountain in Faerieland, and the game ends.

== Development ==
The game was originally announced as a PlayStation title in May 2003 for a release in November of that year, being developed by The Code Monkeys. On the site's weekly newsletter on October 27, the Neopets team announced that PlayStation version would be scrapped in favor of a PlayStation 2 version, and that the game would be released in 2005. The Neopets team stated that the PlayStation couldn't achieve everything they wanted to do for the game, and the move to the PlayStation 2 would also allow for the graphics to be improved.

It is believed that the protagonists were largely the same and a new antagonist to the series would have been present, who was named Master Nola, and spanned two discs, one for each protagonist.

== Gameplay ==
The game features two playable characters: Tormund, a swordsman, and Roberta, a magician. Each character is equipped with unique abilities, including 'specials' or 'motes', which have various effects such as poisoning enemies or generating beams of light during power-up attacks. The potency of magic diminishes as the character's magic reserve depletes. To counteract this, players can replenish their magic gauge by consuming items like Purple Juppies and various fruits or potions found within the game.

In Neopia, there are many motes that assist Tor and Roberta in their quest. These motes can be equipped to their weapons, shields, and armor, and include Light, Sun, Fog, Wind, Fire, Lava, Nova, Supernova, Dark, Shadow, Leaf, Rock, Bubble, and Water.

Players can feed petpets, which are found throughout Neopia; when fed, it will follow the character for a certain time depending on the type of food it was fed and its inherent species. Each petpet gives a special effect, such as seeing invisible objects and restoring health. After feeding the petpet the same kind of food for too long, it will not accept it.

== Reception ==
Reception

Aggregate scores
Aggregator	Score
GameRankings	66%
Metacritic	61/100

Review scores
Publication	Score
G4	2/5
GameSpot	6.1/10
GameZone	6.2/10
IGN	6.5/10
Official U.S. PlayStation Magazine	3.5/5
X-Play	2/5

Neopets: The Darkest Faerie has received mixed reviews. The game was praised for its ambitious scope, faithfulness to its source material, strong storyline, decent length, enjoyability, musical score, and graphics, but has been criticized for its numerous technical issues, uneven pacing, and overly expansive open world. The game received a score of 61 on review aggregator website Metacritic, indicating "mixed or average" reviews.

The game has a 6.5 rating on IGN, with its review stating, “Simple, clean, straightforward and bland, Neopets is a baked potato without fixings, a bed without blankets, a cake without frosting, or a chair without cushions... It's a minimalist's action adventure.”

== See also ==
- Neopets: Petpet Adventures: The Wand of Wishing
