= Neopets =

Virtual pet site

- Neopets logo
- Developers: Neopets, Inc. (1999–2005); Nickelodeon Games (2005–2014); JumpStart Games (2014–2023); NetDragon Websoft (2023); World of Neopia, Inc. (Independent) (2023–present)
- Publishers: Neopets, Inc. (1999–2005); Nickelodeon (2005–2014); JumpStart Games (2014–2023); NetDragon Websoft (2023); World of Neopia, Inc. (2023–present)
- Designers: Adam Powell (1997–2005); Donna Powell (1997–2005)
- Platforms: Cross-platform, web game
- Release: 15 November 1999; 26 years ago
- Genres: Fantasy, Digital pet
- Mode: Single-player with multiplayer interaction

Neopets is a free-to-play virtual pet browser game. First launched in 1999, the game allows users to own virtual pets ("Neopets") and explore a virtual world called "Neopia." Players can earn one of two virtual currencies. One currency, called Neopoints, can be obtained for free through on-site features like games, events, and contests. The other, Neocash (NC), is purchased with real-world money and can be exchanged for wearable items for pets.

Players can buy digital food, toys, and other items for their Neopets to keep them happy. They can also customize the appearance of their Neopets by applying different colors, clothing, accessories, and styles. Additionally, users can train their Neopets to fight in the "Battledome," which offers both PvP and PvE battles. Players interact with others through social features like message boards and guilds, or by buying, selling, and trading items with each other.

== History and development ==
=== Creation and growth (1999–2005) ===
Neopets was conceived in 1997 by Adam Powell, a British student at the University of Nottingham at the time. He shared this idea with Donna Williams and the two started work on the site in September 1999, with Powell responsible for the programming and the database and Williams the web design and art. Their original office was located in Guildford. With the help of two friends, the site launched on 15 November 1999. Powell stated that the original goal was to "keep university students entertained, and possibly make some cash from banner advertising". The site contained popular culture references, such as a Neopet that was simply a picture of entertainer Bruce Forsyth, and another that was a cartoon version of singer Macy Gray.

The user base grew by word of mouth and by Christmas 1999, Neopets was logging 600,000 page views daily and sought investors to cover the high cost of running the site. Later in the month, American businessman Doug Dohring was introduced to the creators of the site and, along with other investors, bought a majority share in January of the following year. Neopets, Inc. was incorporated by Dohring in February 2000, and began business on 28 April. Dohring used Scientology's Org Board to manage the company. Powell and Williams were unaware of the Scientology connections until searching the employees at the newly formed company six months later but did not address this until the company hired a woman to introduce Scientology to Neopets. Powell and Williams stopped the addition of any Scientology education to Neopets and ensured such content never made it into anything site-related.

With the new company, intellectual property that did not belong to Neopets was removed but the site kept the British spellings. The website made money from the first paying customers using an advertising method trademarked as "immersive advertising". In 2004, Neopets released a premium version and started showing advertisements on the basic site that were not shown to premium members.

In the 2000s, Neopets was consistently noted as one of the "stickiest" sites for children's entertainment. A press release from Neopets in 2001 stated that Neopets.com led in site "stickiness" in May and June, with the average user spending 117 minutes a week. Neopets also led in the average number of hours spent per user per month in December 2003 with an average of 4 hours and 47 minutes. A 2004 article stated that Nielsen//NetRatings reported that people were spending around three hours a month on Neopets, more than any other site in its Nielsen category. By May 2005, a Neopets-affiliated video game producer cited about 35 million unique users, 11 million unique IP addresses per month, and 4 billion web page views per month. This producer also described 20% of the users as 18 or older, with the median of the remaining 80% at about 14.

=== Viacom (2005–2014) ===
Viacom, the American conglomerate that owns Nickelodeon, purchased Neopets, Inc. on 20 June 2005 for $160 million and announced plans to focus more on the use of banner ads over the site's existing immersive advertising. Founders Powell and Williams left Neopets, Inc. shortly after the purchase due to creative differences. The following year, a gaming event called The Altador Cup was released to improve interactivity between users and to coincide with the 2006 FIFA World Cup; it had 10.4 million participants in its first year. 2006 also saw the release of Neopets Mobile, a T-Mobile exclusive premium service which allowed users to visit the new land of Lutari Island. The service was discontinued on 30 June 2009, leaving the island completely inaccessible. Neopets was consistently ranked among the top ten "stickiest" sites by both Nielsen//NetRatings and comScore Media Metrix in 2005 and 2006.

The game website was redesigned on 27 April 2007 and included changes to the user interface and the ability to customise Neopets. In June, Viacom promoted Neopets through minishows on its Nickelodeon channel. Promotions included the second Altador Cup and led to an increase in traffic through the site. However, according to Nielsen//NetRatings, in 2007, Neopets lost about 15% of its audience over the previous year. On 17 July, the NC Mall was launched in a partnership with Korean gaming company Nexon Corporation. It allows users to use real money to purchase Neocash to buy exclusive virtual items. In February 2008, comScore ranked it as the stickiest kids entertainment site with the average user spending 2 hours and 45 minutes per month. On 17 June 2008, Viacom formed the Nickelodeon Kids & Family Virtual Worlds Group to "encompass all paid and subscription gaming initiatives across all relevant platforms", including Neopets. By June 2011, Neopets announced that the website had logged 1 trillion page views since its creation.

=== JumpStart and NetDragon (2014–2023) ===
JumpStart Games acquired the Neopets property from Viacom in March 2014. Server migration began in September. JumpStart-owned Neopets was immediately characterized by glitches and site lag. On 6 March 2015, much of the Neopets Team remaining from Viacom were laid off. Then-CEO of JumpStart David Lord assured the community that there were no plans to shut down Neopets, and instead resources were allocated to develop new "events and stories" and address site stability and overall performance on mobile platforms, with plans to expand to additional platforms including Facebook.

During the weekend of 27–28 June 2015, the site's chat filters stopped working. The site's forums were flooded with age-inappropriate messages. In a statement on Facebook, JumpStart apologized, explaining that the issue was due to a "facility move", and that during that move, the moderation team was not able to access the Neopets community.

In January 2017, Neopets then-JumpStart CEO David Lord estimated 100,000 active daily users. On 3 July 2017, Chinese company NetDragon acquired JumpStart Games. The Neopets team started developing in-universe plots again in 2017 for the first time since the JumpStart acquisition, with the first such event going live in late 2017. In January 2020, Neopets logged 3.4 million views per month, a significant decline from its peak. With support for Adobe Flash ending in 2020, the Neopets Team announced in 2019 that it planned to transition Flash elements of the site to HTML5 by the end of 2020. The team prioritized converting popular features, and some parts of the site were left non-functional when Flash support ended. The Neopets Team also announced the development of a mobile app for the site, which was later scrapped in favor of a "mobile-friendly" browser version of the site which launched via an open beta on 9 June 2020. In June 2020, JumpStart CEO Jim Czulewicz estimated Neopets had 100,000 daily active users and 1.5 million monthly active players.

On 13 June 2023, JumpStart announced it would be closing on 30 June.

==== Metaverse ====
On 22 September 2021, the Neopets Metaverse NFT project was announced in collaboration with JumpStart, Cherrypicks, Raydium, and Moonvault. The Neopets Metaverse was to feature a "modernised 3D remake of the classic Neopets game" where players would be required to own Neopets NFTs to play. Prior to the official launch of the metaverse, the project put 20,000 Neopets NFTs up for sale but only 4,225 were purchased. A unique visual glitch revealed that at least one of the promotional images on the Neopets Metaverse website advertising these NFTs was generated using the Neopets fan site Dress to Impress; the image was replaced shortly after it was noticed. The project received a significant amount of criticism from within the Neopets community and it was formally canceled in July 2023.

=== World of Neopia (2023–present) ===
On 17 July 2023, it was announced that Neopets had been purchased from NetDragon through a management buyout deal led by Neopets Chief Metaverse Officer Dominic Law, the former Director of New Markets at both NetDragon and Cherrypicks. The resulting independent company, World of Neopia Inc., is composed of team members from both Neopets and Neopets Metaverse, including Dominic Law as CEO. It was also stated that the site had operated at a loss for over a decade and it announced that Neopets had received $4 million in investment funding in early 2023. Additional funding from the management buyout is said to equip World of Neopia, Inc. to make "meaningful changes in pursuit of a Neopian renaissance." The changes include a homepage revamp and plans to create a mobile app. Following the transition, it was reported that the site achieved its highest revenue stream in 2023 since 2017 (which was the same year Netdragon acquired Jumpstart), and had tripled its monthly active userbase from 100,000 to 300,000 users by April 2024. Dominic Law also claimed that the company was on track to be profitable by the end of 2024. It was also reported that the site demographics had shifted to be significantly older compared to when the website was at its peak, with the majority of users now being over the age of 18 with 40% being reported to between the ages of 25 and 34, and 26% of users being between the ages of 18 and 24, which was reportedly due to many users of the site now being drawn to use Neopets due to nostalgia reasons.

== Gameplay ==
Screenshot of the Neopets Community Central in 2024

Neopets allows users to create and care for digital pets called "Neopets" and explore the virtual world of Neopia. There is no set objective for the users, but they are expected to feed and care for their Neopets when they grow hungry or ill. Neopets will not die if neglected, but their health can limit their gameplay.

Neopets come in a variety of species and colors and users can create or adopt their own. Users can obtain items to interact with their Neopet, such as books to read and toys to play with them. Neopets can be customised with certain clothing items, paintbrushes, morphing potions, and accessories. Neopets themselves can have pets of their own called Petpets.

Neopets can battle against other Neopets or non-player characters in the Battledome but they cannot die there.

Neopia is a virtual planet with fantasy lands inhabited by Neopets and other virtual creatures. Each land has a different theme, such as pirates or prehistory, and their own shops, games, and attractions. Neopia operates on real-world Pacific Time, observing daylight saving time along with California, where its headquarters are located, and has tie-ins with certain real-world holidays such as Halloween and Christmas.

It has its own economy and trade markets based on Neopoints. Users can earn Neopoints through various means including playing games and selling items, which can be invested or used to buy various virtual goods and services.

The site is regularly updated with features like new games, items, and content. Occasionally, the Neopets team release interactive storylines to expand the in-universe lore. In addition to the site content updated by the Neopets team, users also contribute content to the site. User contributions come in the form of prescreened submissions and readily editable content that is automatically filtered, such as the site's weekly electronic newspaper The Neopian Times. There are different types of submissions that will be accepted.

=== Games ===
Users can earn Neopoints from playing games. Games come in many different genres, which include action, puzzles, and chance. Most games have set maximum earnings or playtime. Players may also earn trophies and other awards from games if they score high enough or perform better than other users. Both single-player and multiplayer browser games are available.

The site houses over 100 games; the earliest games released were simple browser-based PHP games. Most of the site's games run on Adobe Flash Player, while a handful of others use Adobe Shockwave Player. In April 2020, in anticipation of the discontinuation of Adobe Flash, Neopets released HTML5 versions of seven of these games, followed by the release of an additional three in October 2021. In January 2021, Adobe Flash was discontinued, making most of the original Adobe Flash games impossible to play without workarounds. In July 2023, most of the original Flash games were restored via the site's integration with the Ruffle Adobe Flash emulator, with some games experiencing compatibility issues.

Users can also participate in contests and spotlights judged by staff to showcase the users' talents. Quests to retrieve items may also be performed for specific NPCs. Challenges may be made against other players or random players in a "World Challenge" for a prize piece and Neopoints from the jackpot for certain web games. Monthly competitions also exist for multiplayer games with four week-long elimination rounds.

=== Economy ===
The Neopets Stock Market

The economy is based on Neopoints. Users can also exchange real money for Neocash, used exclusively for the NC Mall. Users can earn Neopoints through playing games, selling items, and other transactions. Once earned, they can be saved in the bank, used to buy items from other users or non-player character (NPC) shops, used to buy and sell stocks in the Neopian stock market called the NEODAQ (a parody of the NASDAQ), or used to buy various other things. Items can be bought from shops found throughout the world of Neopia that are run by NPCs who may allow bargaining. Users can open their own shops to sell items, sometimes after obtaining those items at a lower price from sources such as other shops or charities. Items may also be exchanged through trading or auctions.

==== Black market ====
In 2021, it was reported that a black market had arisen on the site, mainly driven around unconverted Neopets that had become unavailable for new users after the art style for default Neopets changed in 2007. As not all Neopets were converted during the art style change, unconverted Neopets had become valuable. A number of these unconverted Neopets were stolen from users by others who used them in both on and offsite transactions and sold for real money. This black market had reportedly existed for years without intervention until 2024. In January 2024, Neopets announced the launch of the Styling Studio and Style Tokens. By using NeoCash, users can purchase Styling Studio Supplies which can then be used to obtain Style Tokens. These tokens allow for the toggling and use of old and alternative pet art.

=== Community ===
Neopets has a community for users to chat with and contact other users. Each user has their own profile they can edit with HTML and CSS and are represented by avatars provided by the website, as users cannot upload their own. Most avatars must be "unlocked" by completing certain in-game tasks, such as winning a contest or getting a high score on a game.

Users may request other users to be "Neofriends" or block other users from contacting them. To comply with COPPA, users under 13 years of age cannot access any of the site's communication features without sending in parental consent via fax. The main features include:

- NeoMail, a personal in-game communication system like regular email. Users can write messages to other users and restrict who can contact them through NeoMail.
- Neoboards, public discussion boards for on-topic discussions. Users can enter their own "neoHTML", a restricted form of BBCode, to customise their posts and signatures.
- Guilds, groups of users with similar interests and their own message board.

Discussions through these features are restricted and may not involve topics such as dating and romance or controversial topics like politics and religion. Continuous moderation is performed by paid Neopets staff members, and users can help moderate the site by reporting messages they believe are inappropriate or offensive. Messages are also automatically filtered to prevent users from posting messages with profanity or lewd content.

== Reception ==
Described as an online cross of Pokémon and Tamagotchi, Neopets has received both praise and criticism. It has been praised for having educational content. Children can learn HTML to edit their own pages. They can also learn how to handle money by participating in the economy. Reviews from About.com and MMO Hut considered the multitude of possible activities a positive aspect. Most of the users are female, higher than in other massively multiplayer online games (MMOGs) but equivalent to social-networking-driven communities. Lucy Bradshaw, a vice president of Electronic Arts, attributes the popularity among girls to the openness of the site and said, "Games that have a tendency to satisfy on more than one dimension have a tendency to have a broader appeal and attract girls".

Luck & chance games draw criticism from parents as they introduce children to gambling. In Australia, a cross-promotion with McDonald's led to controversy with Neopets' luck/chance games in October 2004. Australian tabloid television show Today Tonight featured a nine-year-old boy who claimed the site requires one to gamble in order to earn enough Neopoints to feed one's Neopet or else it would be sent to the pound. While gambling is not required, nor are pets sent to the pound if unfed, the website includes games of chance based on real games such as blackjack and lottery scratchcards. After this incident, Neopets prohibited users under the age of 13 from playing Neopets's casino-style games.

=== Immersive advertising ===
Immersive advertising is a trademarked term for the way Neopets displayed advertisements to generate profit after Doug Dohring bought the site. Unlike pop-up and banner ads, immersive ads integrate advertisements into the site's content in interactive forms, including games and items. Players could earn Neopoints from them by playing advergames and taking part in online marketing surveys. Prior to the arrival of the NC Mall, it contributed to 60% of the revenue from the site with paying Fortune 1000 companies including Disney, General Mills, and McDonald's.

It was a contentious issue with the site with regard to the ethics of marketing to children. It drew criticism from parents, psychologists, and consumer advocates who argued that children may not know that they are being advertised to, as it blurred the line between site content and advertisement. Children under eight had difficulty recognizing ads and half a million of the 25 million users were under the age of eight in 2005. Dohring responded to such criticism stating that of the 40 percent of users twelve and younger, very few were seven or eight years old and that preschoolers were not their target audience.

Others criticised the functionality of the site. Susan Linn, another psychologist and author of Consuming Kids: The Hostile Takeover of Childhood considered the purpose of this site was to keep children in front of advertisements. Kalle Lasn, editor-in-chief and co-founder of Adbusters magazine, said the site encouraged kids to spend hours in front of a screen and recruited them to consumerism. Neopets executives stated that paid content constituted less than 1% of the site's total content. Children were not required to play or use sponsor games and items, and all ads were marked as such.

=== Customer security ===
In July 2009, it was reported that the Neopets site was the target of an identity theft scheme that attempted to trick users into clicking a link that would install malware onto the user's computer. According to reports, the scheme was aimed not at child players' Neopets accounts, but at using the malware to steal the financial data and identities of their parents. Viacom stated that it was investigating the issue, and that the reports referred to a version of social engineering rather than an "indictment of Neopets security practices". In an on-site newsletter, Neopets claimed that the site's security measures prevented the posting of such links.

In 2016, Motherboard reported that the account information of an alleged 70 million of Neopets accounts had been compromised. The hack contained usernames, passwords, email addresses, birth dates, gender, and country from 2012 (prior to JumpStart's acquisition), but did not contain credit card information or physical addresses. Neopets responded by sending emails to all affected players.

On 20 July 2022, Neopets confirmed that it had suffered a data breach the day prior. The data breach exposed Neopets' entire database schema, including usernames, emails and passwords of its 69 million users. Neopets responded by forcing a password reset for all users on 1 August 2022, causing some players to be locked out as they no longer had access to the e-mail addresses linked to their accounts. On 29 August 2022 Neopets sent an e-mail to users detailing the results of their subsequent investigation.

== Merchandise ==
The popularity of Neopets spawned real-world merchandise including clothing, jewelry, stickers, books, cereals, video games and more, sold at mainstream outlets and online retailers. Neopets merchandise often contains a code which can be redeemed on the site for an in-game reward. In 2003, Doug Dohring said that Neopets had always planned to "bring the online and offline worlds together in ways that have never been done before".

Neopets, Inc. signed various licensing deals with companies such as Viacom Consumer Products, Thinkway Toys, and Jakks Pacific over the years. Neopets: The Official Magazine was a bi-monthly magazine launched in September 2003; it was replaced in 2008 by Beckett Plushie Pals, which featured Neopets news as well as other companies' products such as Webkinz. Wizards of the Coast released the Neopets Trading Card Game in September 2003, which was promoted in three of General Mills "Big G" cereals and ten Simon Property Group malls. It received two different nominations for "Toy of the Year" as well as other recognitions before being discontinued in 2006. In June 2024, Upper Deck Company released a new trading card game called the Neopets Battledome Trading Card Game.

In 2005, it was announced that a Neopets feature film was in production. It was to be written by Rob Lieber and produced by Dylan Sellers and John A. Davis for Warner Bros., but the project was later cancelled. On 10 February 2020, Blue Ant Media's Beach House Pictures announced that a Neopets animated television series was in development and was set to air in 2021, though there have been no recent updates.

=== Console and mobile games ===
In 2005, Neopets expanded to console game deals. Two video games were released by Sony Computer Entertainment, Neopets: The Darkest Faerie for the PlayStation 2 in 2005 and Neopets: Petpet Adventures: The Wand of Wishing for the PlayStation Portable in 2006. In 2007, MumboJumbo developed the match-3 PC game Neopets: Codestone Quest. In 2008, Neopets Puzzle Adventure was released for Nintendo DS, Wii, and PC. The following year, the handheld game Neopets: Quizara's Curse was released for the LeapFrog Didj. In August 2011, Neopets launched the tie-in game Treasure Keepers on Facebook, but it was discontinued in December of that year.

A number of Neopets mobile games for Android and iOS have also been released. In 2015, Neopets released the match-3 game Ghoul Catchers. In 2019, Neopets released the puzzle game Legends and Letters. Both Ghoul Catchers and Legends and Letters were discontinued in May 2020. In May 2022, Neopets released the construction simulation game Island Builders. In December 2022, Neopets released the match-3 game Faerie's Hope. In Spring 2024, Island Builders was relaunched under the new name Tales of Dacardia.

On March 26th, 2026, Neopets: Mega Mini Games Collection was released for PC, PlayStation 5, Nintendo Switch, and Xbox Series X|S. It was advertised as a "retro-inspired arcade collection featuring 26 mini-games rebuilt for modern play". Reception to the game has been largely poor. GamesRadar's Oscar Taylor-Kent described Neopets: Mega Mini Games Collection as evoking nostalgia but that it was unlikely to appeal to new players. Screen Hype's Lyssa Greywood echoed these sentiments, writing: "It's great for nostalgia. It just doesn't quite have the depth to keep you long-term." Greywood criticized the number of glitches in the game and the lack of a multiplayer mode.

== See also ==
- Club Penguin
- JumpStart
- MMORPG
- Moshi Monsters
