= Iconiq Capital =

American investment management firm based in San Francisco

Iconiq Capital, LLC
- Type: Private
- Industry: Financial services
- Founded: 2011; 15 years ago
- Founder: Divesh Makan; Michael Anders; Chad Boeding; Will Griffith
- Headquarters: San Francisco, California, U.S.
- Products: financial advisory; private equity; venture capital; real estate; philanthropy
- AUM: US$100 billion (2026)
- Number of employees: 500 (2024)
- Website: iconiqcapital.com

Iconiq Capital, LLC (styled as ICONIQ) is an American investment management firm headquartered in San Francisco, California. It functions as a hybrid family office providing specialized financial advisory, private equity, venture capital, real estate, and philanthropic services to its clientele.

== History ==
Iconiq was founded in December 2011 in San Francisco, California by Divesh Makan, Michael Anders and Chad Boeding. The trio previously worked as wealth advisors at Goldman Sachs and Morgan Stanley. During the early 2000s, Makan established relationships with key members of social media start-up Facebook, which later developed into technology conglomerate Meta. One of his first clients was the co-founder of Facebook, Mark Zuckerberg, who introduced Makan to Sheryl Sandberg and Dustin Moskovitz. During his time at both Goldman Sachs and Morgan Stanley, Makan's team had disagreements with the firms' senior leadership over their business practices.

In late 2011, they left Morgan Stanley to set up Iconiq to serve as independent wealth advisors to their clients with more autonomy. ICONIQ's launch coincided with the initial public offering of Facebook in May 2012, which was overseen by Morgan Stanley.

In 2013, the firm launched Iconiq Growth to act as its growth capital arm after receiving encouragement from Dave Goldberg. It brought on Will Griffith (a general partner at TCV), to lead it.

In 2018, Boeding spun out of Iconiq to form his own wealth advisory firm, Epiq Capital.

In 2019, the firm launched Iconiq Impact which was its charity platform. It acted as a separate philanthropic arm to give away capital earned through the family office.

In 2020, Blue Owl Capital acquired a 6% stake in Iconiq.

== Operations ==
Iconiq functions as a hybrid family office for ultra-high-net-worth clients. Their client base primarily derives wealth from the technology, high finance, and entertainment industries. Their investment platform has evolved to include private equity, venture capital, growth equity, and real estate. In addition to retail clients, the firm covers institutional clients, as well, such as the Canadian pension fund, CPP Investment Board. Their hybrid structure was designed to reduce conflict-of-interest between its financial advisory businesses and investment platform. At the clients' discretion, pooled capital may be deployed to ICONIQ's private investment vehicles.

The majority of the firm's assets under management is from wealth management.

== Clientele ==
Iconiq does not disclose its clientele and is known for being secretive within the investment management industry. Select clients that have affiliated themselves with ICONIQ include:

=== Meta ===
- Adam D’Angelo - Quora cofounder, ex-Facebook CTO
- Chamath Palihapitiya - Social Capital CEO, ex-Facebook exec
- Chris Cox - Meta chief product officer
- Chris Hughes - Facebook cofounder
- Dustin Moskovitz - Facebook cofounder, Asana cofounder
- Mark Zuckerberg - Facebook founder and Meta CEO
- Naomi Gleit - Meta VP product and social impact
- Sean Parker - Napster cofounder, first Facebook president
- Sheryl Sandberg - Meta COO

=== Business ===
- Arash Ferdowsi - Dropbox cofounder
- Dan Rosensweig - Chegg CEO
- David Bonderman - TPG cofounder
- Diane Greene - VMware cofounder, ex-Google Cloud CTO
- Drew Houston - Dropbox cofounder
- Eddy Cue - Apple SVP internet software and services
- Henry Kravis - Cofounder of KKR
- Jack Dorsey - Twitter, Square CEO
- James Murdoch - Ex-Fox Corp. CEO
- Jeff Weiner - LinkedIn executive chairman
- Joshua Kushner - Venture capitalist
- Justin Rosenstein - Asana cofounder
- Kevin Hartz - Eventbrite cofounder, chairman
- Kevin Ryan - Gilt Groupe, Business Insider cofounder
- Mark Pincus - Zynga founder
- Mike Krieger - Instagram cofounder
- Ryan Graves - Ex-Uber CEO
- Satya Nadella - Microsoft CEO
- Sean Rad - Tinder cofounder
- Travis VanderZanden - Bird CEO

=== Entertainment ===
- Ashton Kutcher
- Blake Lively
- J.J. Abrams
- Justin Timberlake
- Quincy Jones
- Rita Wilson
- Ryan Reynolds
- Tom Hanks
- Will Smith

== Portfolio ==
- ABCmouse.com
- Adyen
- Airbnb
- Alibaba
- Alteryx
- Apttus
- Coupa
- CrowdStrike
- CSL Group Ltd
- Datadog
- Dataiku
- DocuSign
- Epic Games
- ezCater
- Fastly
- Flipkart
- GitLab
- GreenSky
- GoFundMe
- Guild Education
- The Honest Company
- Lucid Software, Inc
- Modern Meadow
- Motorway (brand)
- Netshoes
- The Newbury Boston
- ONE Championship
- Pluralsight
- Procore
- Robinhood
- Snowflake Inc.
- Tencent Music
- Virtru
- WeLab
- Wolt
- Uber
- Zoom
