= Neopets: Petpet Adventures: The Wand of Wishing =

2006 video game

- Developer: San Diego Studio
- Publisher: Sony Computer Entertainment
- Artist: Scott Butler
- Platform: PlayStation Portable
- Release: NA: March 14, 2006
- Genre: Action role-playing
- Mode: Single-player

Neopets: Petpet Adventures: The Wand of Wishing is a 2006 action role-playing video game developed by San Diego Studio and published by Sony Computer Entertainment for the PlayStation Portable. It is the second game in Viacom's Neopets franchise to be published by Sony and was only released in North America.

== Gameplay ==
Players take the role of a Petpet from Neopia who becomes anthropomorphic after stepping into a different world. There are four playable Petpet species; Doglefox, Krawk, Mazzew, and Meowclops, each with slightly different starting stats. The player can change the color of the Petpet during gameplay by entering a magical colored pool.

The player can acquire items such as swords, staves, wands, magic spells, and armor for the head and body. These items can then be equipped to improve combat ability and defense. Some items can be set up in a separate inventory where they can be used during gameplay. The inventory starts with only three slots but can be increased to eight during the course of the game.

There is no experience or leveling up to improve the Petpet. Instead, tokens have to be won by paying a fee and challenging bosses in the Battledome. Once a player has the correct token for a particular statistic, it then can be used by a trainer to increase a stat. Also available in the Battledome is a wireless feature where players' Petpets can fight each other. If ad hoc multiplayer is used, the entrance fee is removed and the winner still receives the token corresponding to the Battledome challenged in.

It is not possible to reenter previous areas after entering a new location.

Players can acquire Petpetpets by feeding them a specified food and then picking them up after they eat the food.

== Plot ==
The game takes place in the hidden Petpet world of Petaria, in which the player controls a Petpet named "Fluffy" who is sent there from Neopia to retrieve the magical "Wand of Wishing" stolen by Archos in order to prevent him from misusing it.

== Reception ==
IGN praised the game for its cute protagonists and outdoing typical expectations of a franchise game. IGN states that the gameplay is comparable to Champions of Norrath: Realms of EverQuest on the PlayStation 2 system. However, there is criticism of imbalance, such as the difficulty when starting off and the overpowering bows that can be acquired.

Reception

Aggregate score
Aggregator	Score
Metacritic	66/100

Review scores
Publication	Score
GameSpot	6.5/10
IGN	6.9/10

== See also ==
- Neopets: The Darkest Faerie
