= Speedyclick.com =

American entertainment website

SpeedyClick.com was an entertainment-based website operating out of Glendale, CA circa 1998 – 2001. The site featured contests, original content, and free web-style games such as blackjack, bingo, and virtual slot machines. By spending time on the site, registered users accumulated virtual currency known as “SpeedyBucks” that they could then redeem for prizes such as clothing or mousepads, or trade with other users in an eBay-style bartering area. SpeedyClick had a banner ad-style revenue model and also developed custom product placement games for various corporate sponsors.

At its peak, SpeedyClick had more than 3 million monthly visitors, with a 7.3 percent reach of women on the Internet, and more than 1 million registered users. In an attempt to employ additional revenue models, SpeedyClick also marketed various B2B services to startup wannabes, touting custom web design services incorporating SpeedyClick's “StickyEngine”.

In November 1999, Seattle-based ShopNow (later Network Commerce Inc.) acquired SpeedyClick for $47 million in ShopNow stock and $3 million in cash.

SpeedyClick succumbed to the dot com bust in a fashion typical to many web-centric companies of their time. By late 2001, floundering Network Commerce Inc., delisted from NASDAQ and pursued by investors, closed the doors of its various offices, including SpeedyClick. Its former URL now routes to one of the ubiquitous type-in traffic harvest search pages.

== See also ==
- Electronic money
- Internet currency
