= Fred DeLuca =

American businessman (1947–2015)

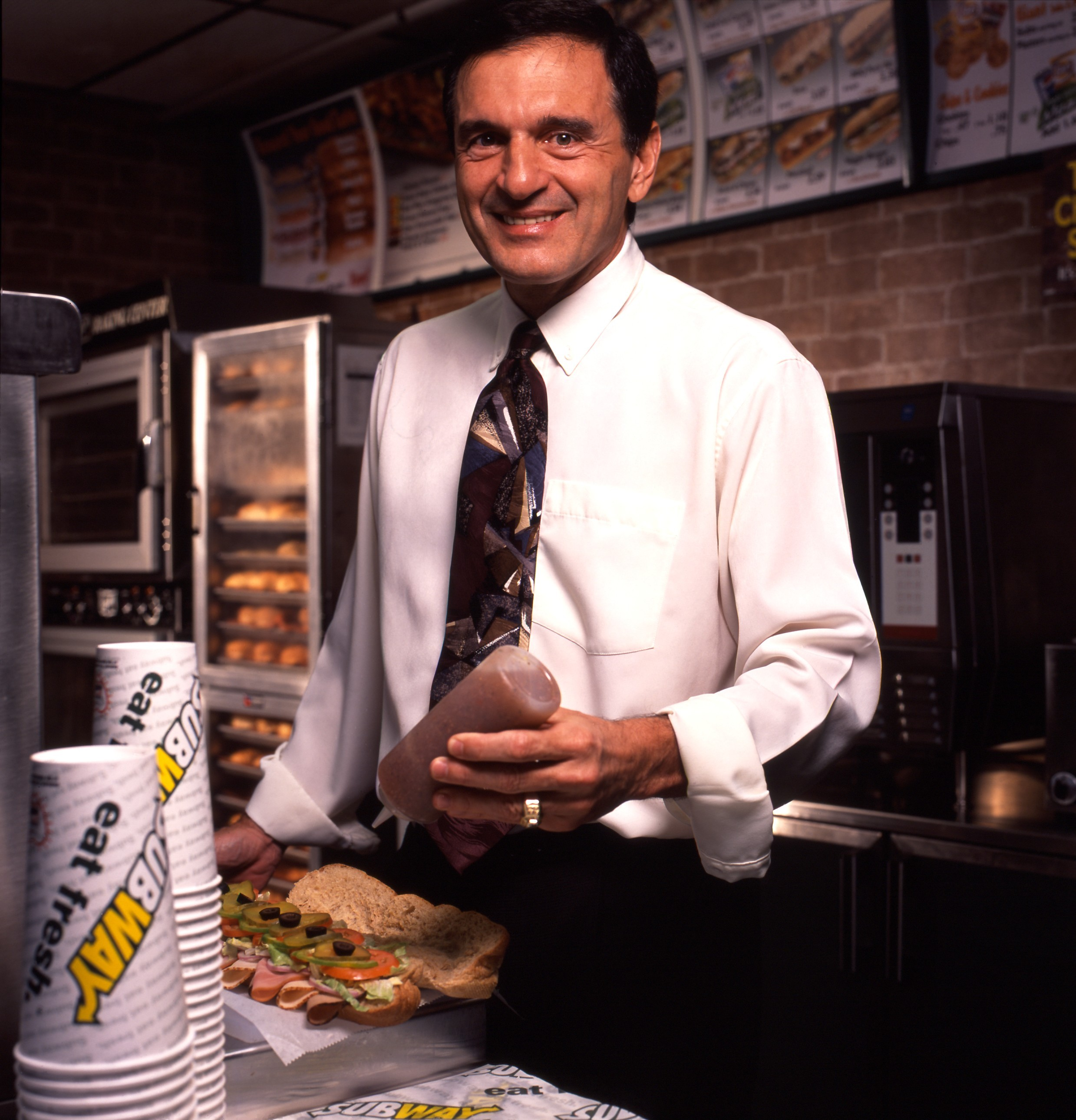
- DeLuca in 2011
- Born: Frederick James Matthew DeLuca; October 3, 1947; New York City, U.S.
- Died: September 14, 2015 (aged 67); Lauderdale Lakes, Florida, U.S.
- Education: University of Bridgeport
- Years active: 1965–2015
- Title: Founder / President of Subway (1965–2015)
- Spouse: Elisabeth DeLuca (m. 1969)
- Children: 2
- Relatives: Suzanne Greco (sister)

Frederick Adrian DeLuca (October 3, 1947 – September 14, 2015) was an American businessman, who was the co-founder and president of the Subway franchise of fast food restaurants with Peter Buck. During his tenure, Subway grew into the largest franchise in the world.

== Early life ==
Fred DeLuca was born in Brooklyn, New York, on October 3, 1947 to Italian American parents Carmela and Salvatore DeLuca. At the age of 10, DeLuca moved to Amsterdam, New York, where he and his family became friends with Peter Buck. Once in his teens, he moved with his family to Bridgeport, Connecticut, where he graduated from Central High School in 1965. DeLuca realized a dream of his to go to college and graduated from the University of Bridgeport.

While in high school, Fred began dating his schoolmate Elisabeth, who had immigrated to the United States at age seven along with her parents of East Prussian origin. The two married in 1969.

== Career ==
In 1965, 17-year-old DeLuca borrowed $1,000 from family friend Peter Buck. This was after Buck suggested the idea to help DeLuca make money for college to study medicine. DeLuca's plan was to begin a "fast-food venture that provided a healthful, less fattening bill of fare". On the radio advertisement they had promoted the name as "Pete's Submarines," which sounded like "Pizza Marines", so they changed the name to "Pete's Subway." Eventually in 1968, it was shortened to simply "Subway" as it is still known.

=== Early years of Subway ===
With the help of his mother Carmela and Dr. Buck, the first shop opened on August 28, 1965, in Bridgeport, Connecticut. The first year of business was a learning experience and a challenge. A year later they opened their second location, having realized that visibility and marketing were key factors to success. DeLuca believed that the biggest mistake he made was where he set up his very first shop as it was a "crummy location." The third outlet was in a highly visible location and that location is still there.

Fred DeLuca ran Subway as a family business, with his mother running the first shop, his sister working as a "sandwich artist" and even his wife Elisabeth worked in the corporate office. Every Monday, Dr. Buck would visit the DeLuca household and visit Carmela and Fred to discuss the Subway business. As time went on, they eventually turned to a franchising model which is when they saw their growth explode.

In 1978, Subway's 100th store opened, and reached the 1,000 store mark in 1987. Explosive growth continued with Subway opening 1,100 units in 1993.

=== Jared Fogle ===
After reading an article about an Indiana man who lost 245 pounds (111 kg) eating Subway Sandwiches, Fred DeLuca met Jared Fogle, bought him a new Mitsubishi Galant, and made him Subway's featured spokesman by 2000. After Fogle became Subway's spokesman, sales and store openings started to skyrocket.

By 2015, a Subway franchisee whistleblower named Cindy Mills alerted several high-ranking Subway executives about Fogle having pedophilia and engaging in illicit sexual activity. In a statement, Subway denied any knowledge of Fogle's pedophilia and that executives including DeLuca and others were previously unaware of Fogle engaging in underage prostitution both in the United States and in Thailand.

=== Other ventures ===
DeLuca and Buck also partnered to create Franchise Brands.

=== Legacy ===
During DeLuca's tenure, Subway grew to be the largest franchise in the world. DeLuca aggressively pursued store growth, requiring franchisees open stores nearby their existing ones, in some cases across the street from their existing locations, or else Subway would recruit a competitor that would put them out of business. From 2015 to 2023, Subway had a net loss of approximately 7,000 restaurant locations, although it remains the largest sandwich chain in the US.

== Personal life ==
DeLuca had homes in Milford, Connecticut, and Fort Lauderdale, Florida, and lived with his wife Elisabeth. His son, Jonathan, lives in Boca Raton, Florida. DeLuca adopted a child of Cindy Mattson, named Luca.

== Death ==
On July 17, 2013, DeLuca announced that he was being treated for leukemia. DeLuca died on September 14, 2015, at Lauderdale Lakes, Florida.

== Honors ==
At the graduation commencement in 2002, DeLuca received an honorary Doctor of Humane Letters (L.H.D.) from his alma mater, the University of Bridgeport. He also was awarded the Lifetime Achievement Award from the Connecticut Restaurant Association
