= Sticky content =

Style of web content

In web publishing, sticky content is website content with the purpose of holding users' attention, so encouraging them to return to that particular website or to spend longer periods of time on the site. Webmasters use this method to build up a community of returning visitors to a website.

Examples are chat rooms, online forums, webmail, Internet games, weather, news and horoscopes.

== See also ==
- Attention economy
- Clickbait
