= Subway (restaurant) =

American fast food chain

Subway IP LLC
- Logo used since 2016
- Trade name: Subway
- Formerly: Pete's Super Submarine Sandwiches (1965–1968); Pete's Subs (1968–1970); Pete's Subway (1970–1972)
- Type: Private
- Industry: Restaurant
- Genre: Fast food
- Founded: August 28, 1965; 61 years ago in Bridgeport, Connecticut, U.S.
- Founders: Fred DeLuca; Peter Buck; Carmela DeLuca
- Headquarters: Shelton, Connecticut, U.S.
- Number of locations: 37,000 (September 2023)
- Area served: Worldwide (100+ countries)
- Key people: Jonathan Fitzpatrick (president & CEO)
- Products: Submarine sandwiches; Salads; Cookies; Soft drinks; Pizzas (selected locations)
- Revenue: ▼US$16.1 billion (2019)
- Owner: Roark Capital Group
- Number of employees: 410,000, including franchises (2022)
- Website: subway.com

Subway IP LLC, trading as Subway, is an American multinational fast food restaurant franchise that specializes in made-to-order submarine sandwiches (subs) and wraps. It was founded by Fred DeLuca and financed by Peter Buck in 1965 as Pete's Super Submarine Sandwiches in Bridgeport, Connecticut. After several name changes, it was renamed as Subway in 1972, and a franchise operation began in 1974 with a second restaurant in Wallingford, Connecticut.

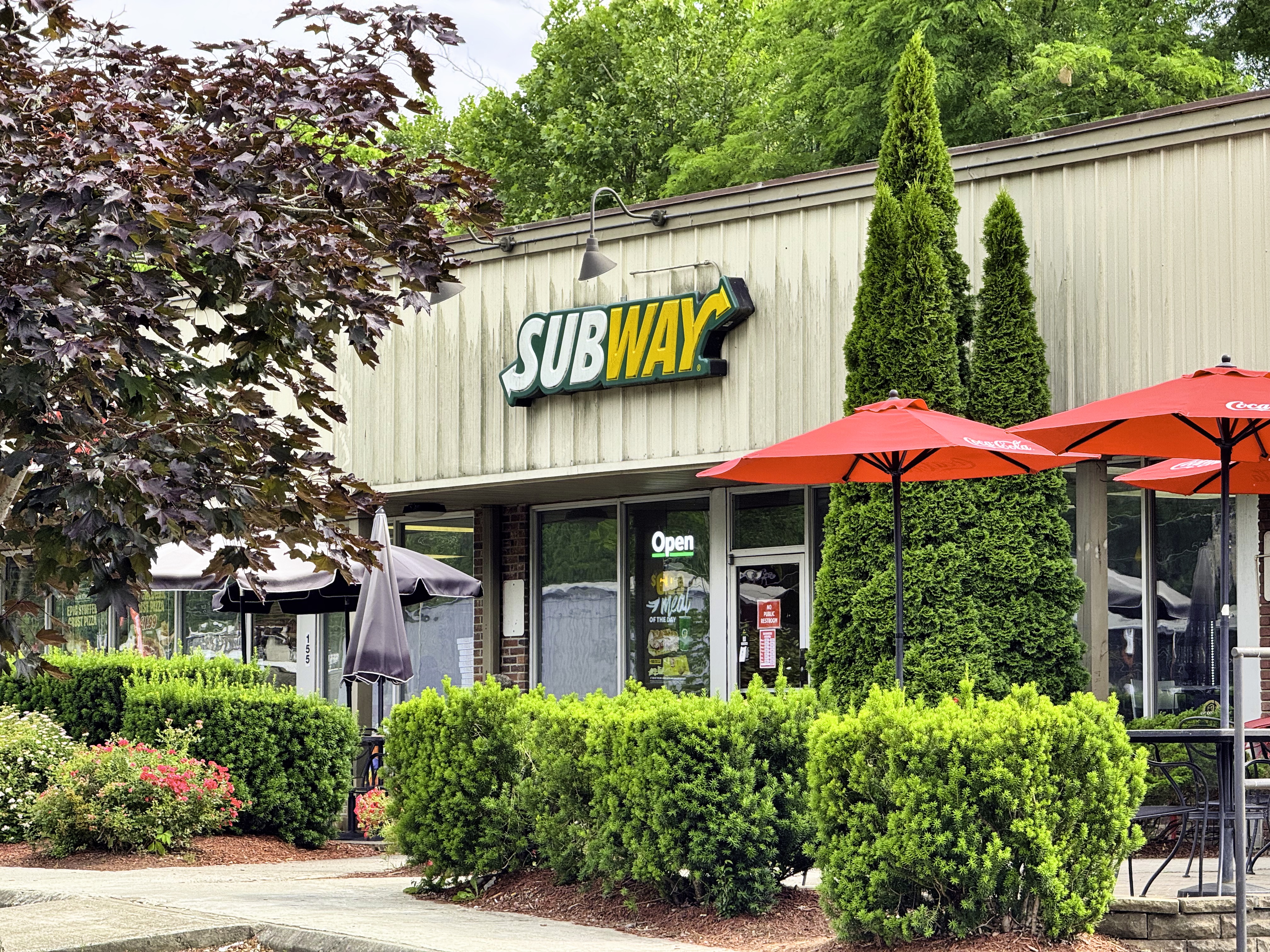
Subway at a strip mall in Franklin, North Carolina

It was the fastest-growing franchise in the world in 2015 and, as of September 2023, has over 37,000 locations in more than 102 countries and territories. More than half its locations (21,796 or 61.1%) are in the United States. It is the largest single-brand restaurant chain and the largest restaurant operator in the world. Its international headquarters are in Shelton, Connecticut.

== History ==
1973–2002 logo (still used at some locations in northern Canada)

2002–2015 logo (still used at some locations)

2015–2016 logo (mostly only used in advertisements)

=== 20th century: Foundation and expansion ===
In 1965, Fred DeLuca borrowed $1,000 from his friend Peter Buck to start "Pete's Drive-In: Super Submarine Sandwiches" at 3851 Main Street in Bridgeport, Connecticut, and in the following year, they formed Doctor's Associates Inc. to oversee operations of the restaurants as the franchise expanded. The holding company derives its name from DeLuca's goal to earn enough from the business to pay tuition for medical school, as well as Buck's having a doctorate in physics. In 1968, the sandwich shop was renamed Pete's Subway. In 1976, a franchise operation began with a restaurant in Wallingford, Connecticut.

The first Subway on the West Coast was opened in Fresno, California, in 1978. The first Subway outside of North America opened in Bahrain in December 1984. The first Subway in Canada opened in St. John's in 1986. The first Subway in the United Kingdom opened in Brighton in 1996.

In 1989, Subway acquired Cajun Joe's, a Boston, Massachusetts-based chain which sold fried chicken and Cajun cuisine. The venture proved unsuccessful, and most were closed by the end of the 1990s.

=== 21st century ===
==== 2000s: Fast growing franchise ====
In 2004, Subway began opening stores in Walmart supercenters, and surpassed the number of McDonald's locations inside U.S. Walmart stores in 2007. Since 2007, Subway has consistently ranked in the Entrepreneur Franchise 500.

==== 2010s: Fred DeLuca dies ====
At the end of 2010, Subway became the largest fast food chain worldwide– with 33,749 restaurants; 1,012 more than McDonald's. In 2015, Subway ranked third on the "Top Global Franchises" list, and first as the "Fastest Growing Franchise."

"Choice Mark" symbol used since 2016

In January 2015, Suzanne Greco became president and CEO. Her brother Fred DeLuca, the company's first CEO, had been ill for two years and died of leukemia in September 2015. In 2016, Subway closed hundreds of restaurants in the United States, experiencing a net loss in locations for the first time. However, with 26,744 locations, it remained the most ubiquitous restaurant chain in the United States (with McDonald's in the #2 spot).

In July 2017, Subway unveiled redesigned restaurants, dubbed 'Fresh Forward', with new company branding. The company installed self-order kiosks, USB charging ports at tables, and added new menu items.

In 2017, Subway closed more than 800 U.S. locations. In April 2018, it announced it would close about 500 more that year. According to Abha Bhattarai of The Washington Post, this was a result of three consecutive years of falling profits and a 25 percent reduction in foot traffic in Subway stores since 2012. Franchisees also complained that the company's deep promotions further ate away at profits. In January 2018, Subway invested $25 million in a re-branding campaign targeting young consumers to revitalize its image and boost sales. In 2019, John Chidsey joined Subway as the company's first CEO who was not a founding family member. He focused on improving established U.S. locations rather than building new restaurants.

==== 2020s: Roark Capital takes over ====
In December 2020, Subway partnered with ezCater to offer a new online catering platform.

In 2023, the family announced that they were in the process of selling the company to private ownership. The company enlisted the help of JP Morgan with the sale. The price of the company was reported to be around $10 billion. Several potential buyers made offers for the company. These included the asset management division of investment bank Goldman Sachs, TDR Capital, and TPG Inc. On August 24, Subway announced that Roark Capital would purchase the company for $9.6 billion. The deal's reported value would make it the third-biggest US acquisition in restaurant history, behind Burger King's 2014 acquisition of Tim Hortons for $11.4 billion and Inspire Brands' purchase of Dunkin' Brands in 2020 for $11.3 billion.

In November 2023, the Federal Trade Commission announced it was looking into investigating the deal as it would possibly give Roark a monopoly in the sandwich shop industry via the firm's existing ownership of Subway's competitors McAlister's Deli and Jimmy John's. On April 30, 2024, Roark officially acquired Subway after the FTC determined that Roark did not have an unfair advantage.

On March 19, 2024, Subway signed a 10-year deal with PepsiCo that began on January 1, 2025, ending the restaurant chain's partnership with the Coca-Cola Company that was first signed in 2003, went into effect the following year in 2004, and the Coke switchover was completed by 2005. Many of Subway's international locations had already gone back to serving Pepsi products between 2015 and 2018. Pepsi previously had a deal with them when they were founded that lasted until the Coca-Cola switchover.

By the end of March 2024, the company's Brazilian unit went into bankruptcy with over BRL 482 million (nearly $100 million) in debt. SouthRock Capital, operator of Brazilian Subway restaurants, later declared Chapter 15 bankruptcy in June 2024.

== Corporate affairs ==
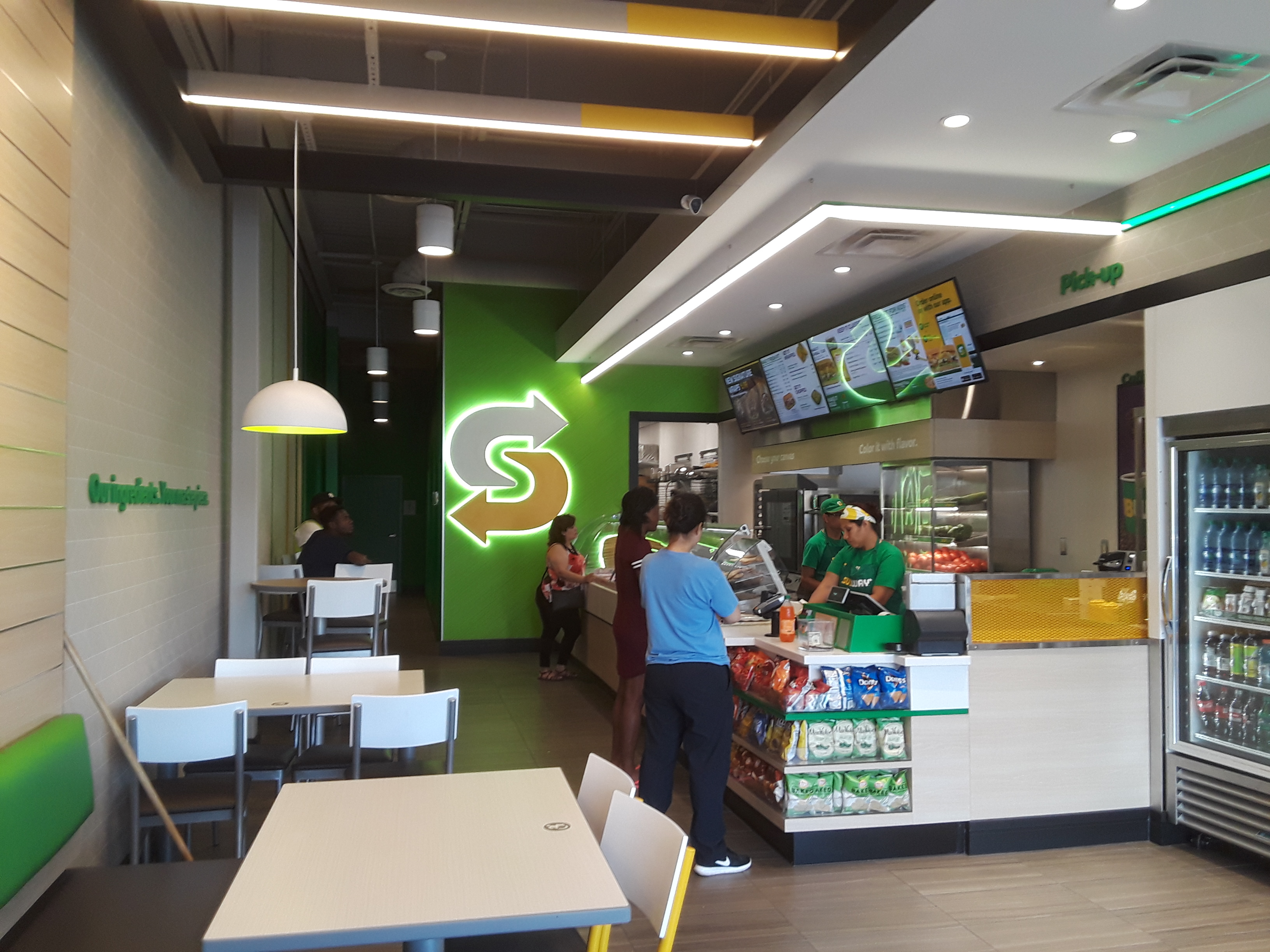
Interior of a Subway franchise in Huntington, Virginia designed in the new style

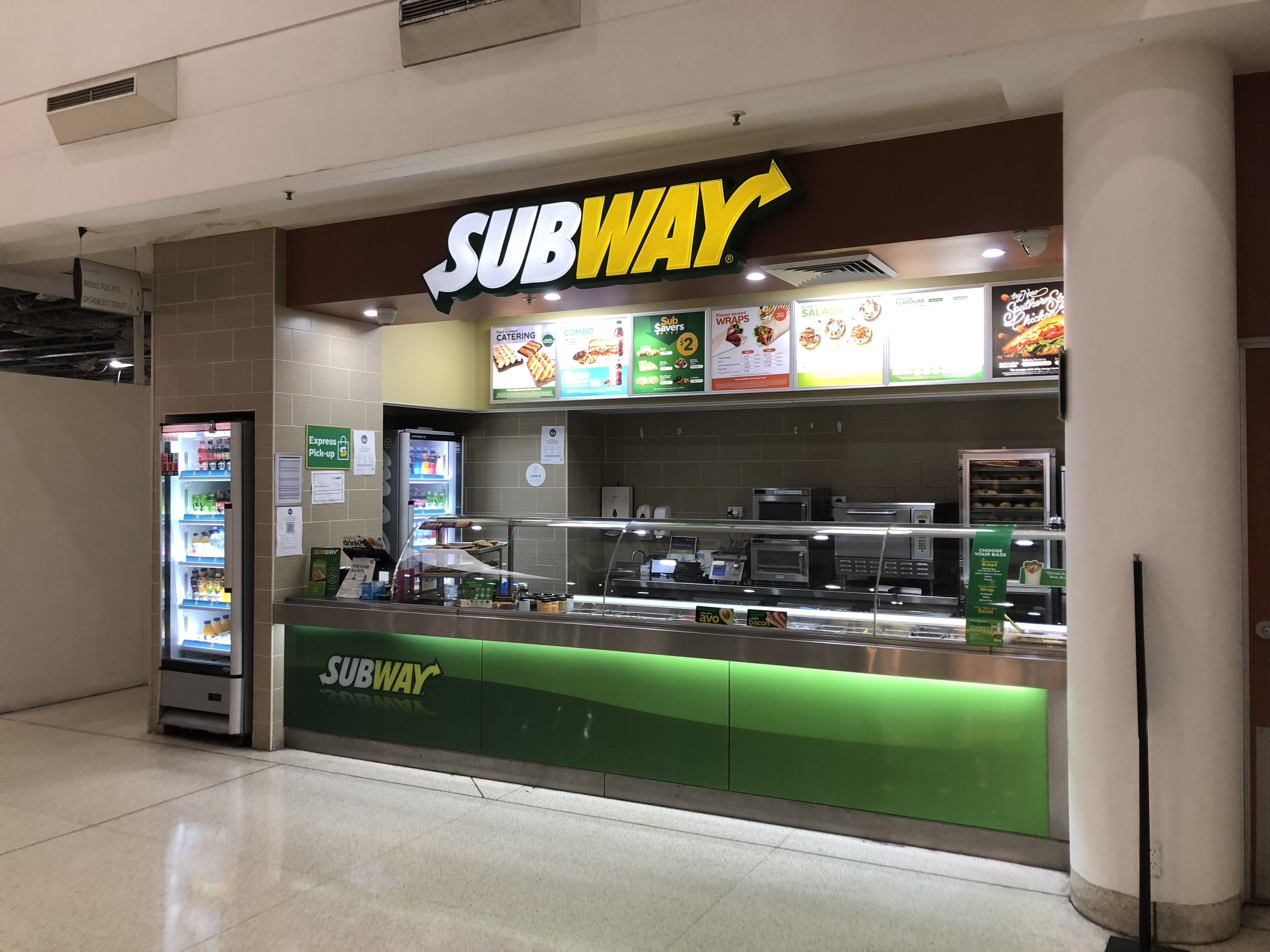
Subway in Sydney, Australia

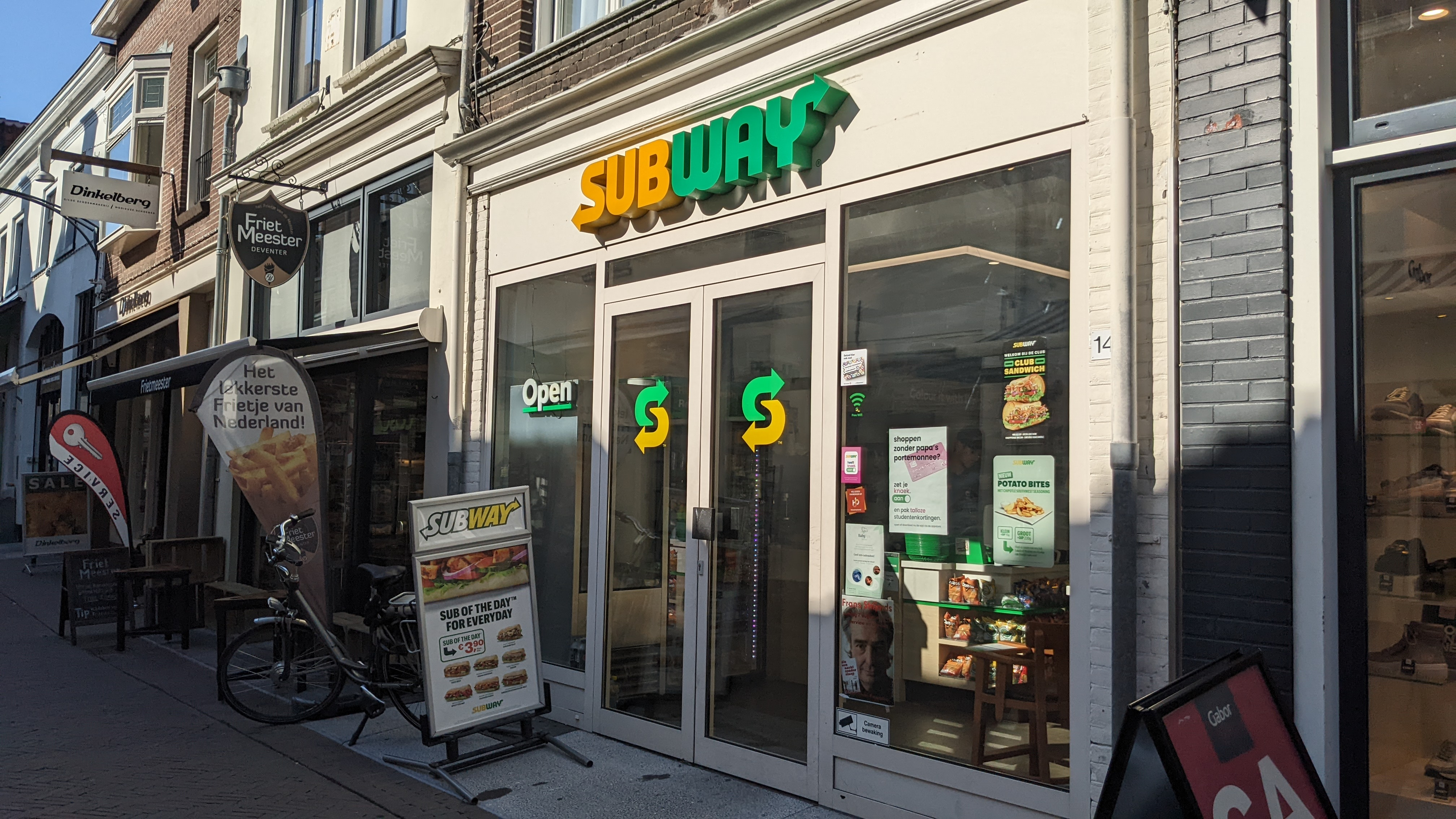
Subway in Deventer, Netherlands

Subway in Angeles City, Philippines

=== Ownership ===
As of 2024, Subway was owned by the private equity group Roark Capital. Prior to that, Subway had been owned by its founding families for six decades. In 2019, John Chidsey joined Subway as the first chief executive officer outside of the DeLuca family.

=== Structure ===
As of 2017, the Subway Group of companies was organized as follows:

- Subway IP Inc. is the owner of the intellectual property for the restaurant system.
- Franchise World Headquarters, LLC leads franchising operations. FWH Technologies, LLC owns and licenses Subway's point of sale software.
- Franchisors include Doctor's Associates Inc. in the U.S.; Subway International B.V.; Subway Franchise Systems of Canada, Ltd.; etc.
- Advertising affiliates include Subway Franchisee Advertising Fund Trust, Ltd.; Subway Franchisee Advertising Fund Trust, B.V.; Subway Franchisee Canadian Advertising Trust; etc.
- IPC Europe (Independent Purchasing Company Europe Limited), manager of the Subway franchisees and the Subcard loyalty scheme in European countries.

=== Headquarters ===
Subway's international headquarters are in Shelton, Connecticut. The company is in the Enterprise Corporate Park, where it takes 90,000 square feet (8,400 m^{2}) of space on three floors. This facility began operations in 2023. The company stated that it chose Shelton due to proximity to various locations in Connecticut as well as proximity to points of interest.

Previously the headquarters were in Milford, Connecticut, taking up three land portions. In 2024 the former buildings were razed.

There are five regional centers supporting the company's international operations. The regional offices for European franchises are located in Amsterdam (Netherlands); the Australian and New Zealand locations are supported from Brisbane (Australia); the Asian locations are supported from offices in Beirut (Lebanon) and Singapore; and the Latin American support center is in Miami (US).

=== Franchising ===
The startup cost of owning a Subway franchise is significantly lower than competitors, beginning at around $200,000 to $500,000. However, Subway franchisees also pay some of the highest percentages of profits (around 12.5%) back to Subway compared to competitors.

== Locations ==
Distribution of Subway restaurants around the world 1000 or more 100 to 999 10 to 99 1 to 9 0

As of February 2023, Subway had approximately 37,000 locations in more than 100 countries, all independently owned and operated by a network of franchisees. Subway has the highest concentration of locations in North America with more than 20,000 in the United States, 2,881 in Canada, and 758 in Mexico, as of 2019. This was almost as many U.S. locations as McDonald's and Starbucks combined, as of 2018. Outside North America, the countries with the most locations are Australia (1,215), Brazil (1,643), and the United Kingdom (2,195), as of 2019.

== Products ==
A footlong oven-roasted turkey sub, halved

=== Overview ===
Subway's core product is the submarine sandwich (or "sub"). It also sells wraps, salad, paninis, and baked goods (including cookies, doughnuts, and muffins). Subway also sells breakfast sandwiches, English muffins, and flatbread. In 2006, "personal pizzas" debuted in some US markets. These are made to order (like the subs) and heated for 85 seconds. Breakfast and pizza items are only available in select locations. In November 2009, Subway signed a deal to serve exclusively Seattle's Best Coffee coffee as part of its breakfast menu in the US.

Subway's best-selling sandwich, the B.M.T. (short for "Biggest, Meatiest, Tastiest"), contains pepperoni, salami and ham. It was introduced as a reference to Brooklyn-Manhattan Transit, connecting to the "subway" name.

In April 2017, Subway announced the addition of paninis to its menu. Chipotle Steak & Cheese, Triple Cheese, Chicken Cordon Bleu, and Italian B.M.T. Melt were the four variations announced. In September 2018, Subway debuted the Chipotle Cheesesteak sandwich for a limited time. Regional testing of a crispy chicken sandwich also began taking place in Arkansas. In January 2024, Subway debuted Sidekicks, a new range of footlong baked goods in partnership with Cinnabon and Auntie Anne's.

==== SubDog ====
Subway's SubDog is an American-style hotdog, topped with mozzarella cheese, tomato sauce and a limited-edition tangy mustard, in which started as an April Fool's joke in 2022 but due to popular demand Subway brought the SubDog to reality as a limited-time offer. Subway announced the return of the SubDog in Australia for a limited time in 2024 between 2 September to 6 October. It was introduced in Canada in the summer of 2026 as well.

=== Regional variations ===
Subway's menu varies between countries, most significantly where religious requirements relate to the meats served.

In 2006, the first kosher Subway restaurant in the United States opened in a suburb of Cleveland, Ohio in the Mandel Jewish Community Center of Cleveland. Former Subway spokesman Jared Fogle attended the opening. A press release stated, "With slight modifications, such as no pork-based products, and the use of soy-based cheese product, the menu is virtually identical to that of any other Subway restaurant." Other openings soon followed, briefly making Subway one of the largest U.S. kosher restaurant chains. At their peak, twelve kosher Subway locations were open in the U.S., including Kansas City and 5 in New York. As of 2023, only one kosher Subway remains, in Miami, FL. Franchisees who failed noted a lack of support from the parent location in advertising, higher costs of kosher food and supervision, the inability to remain open on Saturdays, and that customers who do not keep kosher prefer the original menu and prices.

Subway opened its first restaurant in India in 2001 in New Delhi. In deference to Hindu beliefs, Subway restaurants in India do not serve beef products; on the other hand, the country's large number of vegetarians induced Subway's Indian outlets to offer a much-extended range of vegetarian options. As of January 2017, there were 591 Subway restaurants in 68 Indian cities. On September 4, 2012, Subway opened its first all-vegetarian outlet on the campus of Lovely Professional University (LPU) in Jalandhar, Punjab. On March 6, 2013, Subway opened its second all-vegetarian outlet also offering Jain food in Paldi, Ahmedabad.

=== Nutritional content ===
In 2011, Subway introduced gluten-free bread and brownies to some locations in Texas. It also cut the salt content of its sandwiches by 15 percent in 2011.

== Marketing ==
Subway is the second-biggest fast food advertiser in the United States, behind only McDonald's. It spent US$516,000,000 on measurable advertising in 2011.

Subway used the advertising slogan "Eat Fresh" and focused on how its sandwiches were made from freshly baked bread and fresh ingredients, in front of customers to their exact specifications, by employees which Subway called "Subway Sandwich Artists".

In 2005, Subway scrapped its "Sub Club" stamp promotion, citing a growing number of counterfeit stamps due to online auction sites and the increasing availability of high-quality printers.

In November 2007, Subway's US commercials featured the cartoon character Peter Griffin (from FOX's Family Guy) promoting its new Subway Feast sandwich.

Subway ran a product placement campaign in the US TV series Chuck since its first season. As ratings dwindled in the second season, a campaign to "save Chuck" was launched for fans, encouraging them to purchase a footlong sub from Subway on April 27, 2009, the date of the season finale. Tony Pace, Subway's marketing officer, called it the best product placement the restaurant chain has done "in several years."

To celebrate National Sandwich Day on November 3, 2015, Subway offered a Buy One sandwich, Give One sandwich free promotion.

Most Subway locations feature a promotion named "Sub of the Day" where a different submarine sandwich is featured each day of the week at a discounted price. In the past they had a monthly promotion that featured a specialty sub sandwich at a discounted price for the entire month.

=== Jared Fogle ===
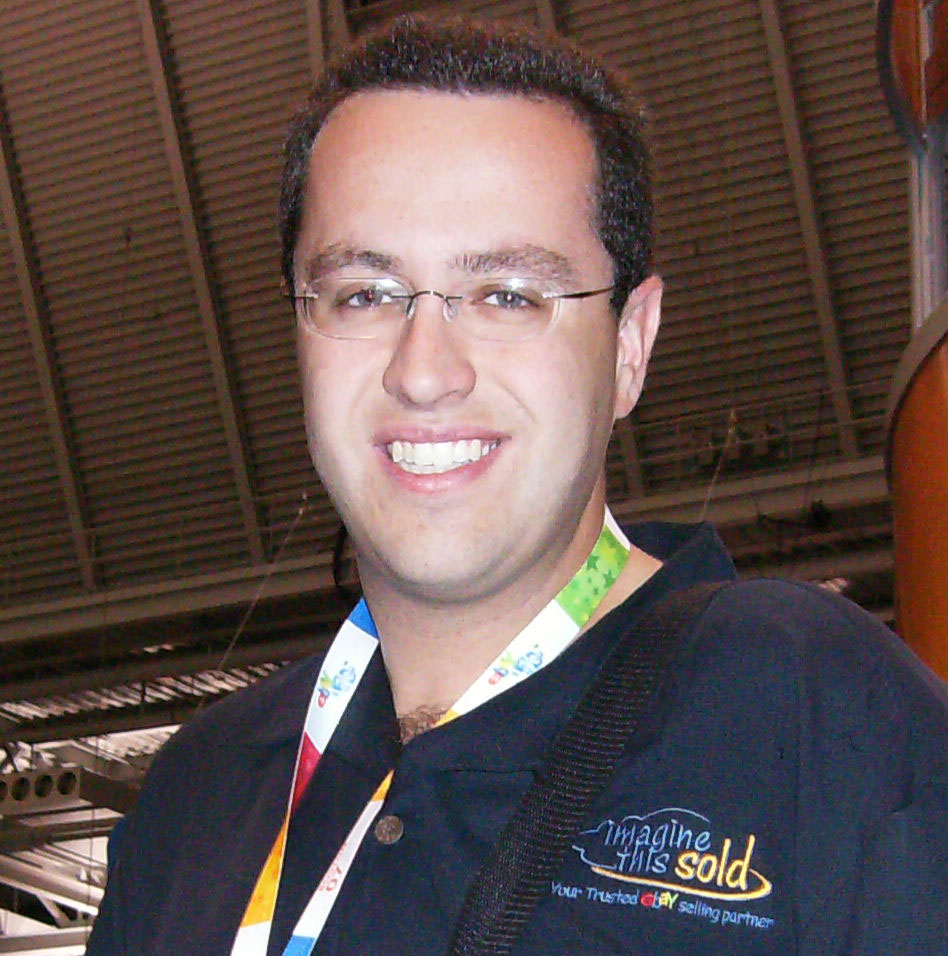
Jared Fogle in 2007

Beginning in January 2000, Jared Fogle was a national spokesman for the company in the United States, giving talks on healthy living and appearing in advertisements. Fogle first came to attention in his native Indiana by claiming that he lost over 200 pounds (91 kg) in part by eating at Subway. After 2008, he was featured less often as the company marketed with more emphasis on its "5 dollar footlong" campaign. Subway attributed between one-third and one-half of its growth from 1998 to 2011 to Fogle, the equivalent of a tripling in size. Subway ended its relationship with Fogle in 2015 after he was charged with possession of child pornography and illicit sexual conduct with minors. After pleading guilty in August 2015, he was sentenced to more than 15 years in federal prison three months later.

In December 2015, following the removal of Fogle from its marketing, Subway introduced a new marketing campaign, "Founded on Fresh". The campaign focuses on Subway's establishment and early history and features Fred DeLuca, as played by his son, Jonathan. The new campaign downplays the use of jingles and celebrity endorsements (besides "targeted" sports marketing) in favor of focusing on the qualities of its products and specific products. Chief advertising officer Chris Carroll explained that the focus on fat, calories, and weight loss were "what fresh used to be" and that the new campaign would focus more on the sourcing of Subway's ingredients, such as its phase-out of antibiotic-treated meat. Carroll also explained that the new strategy was being developed prior to the controversy involving Fogle.

=== $5 footlongs ===
In 2008, Subway began to offer all its regular one-foot-long (30 cm) submarine sandwiches (excluding the premium and double-meat varieties) for five dollars (equivalent to $7.48 in 2025), in the continental United States and Canada, as a "limited time only" promotion. "Five Dollar Footlongs" quickly became the company's most successful promotion ever. Upon the initial promotion's completion, customer response prompted Subway to create a "$5 Footlong Everyday Value Menu" that offered some footlong sandwiches for $5. Since 2011, there has been a monthly rotating $5 footlong. In October 2011, a similar promotion was launched in the United Kingdom. Customers can buy one of nine subs and any drink for £3 (for a 6-inch [15 cm] sub) or £5 (for a footlong).

In 2012, San Francisco restaurants discontinued the five-dollar footlong promotion due to the higher cost of doing business in the city. From June 2014 to the end of that year, some Subway locations began discontinuing the $5 promotion. On November 1, 2014, Subway discontinued the five-dollar footlong promotion, replacing it with the Simple $6 Menu which included a six-inch select with a drink and a choice of cookies or chips.

In February 2016, Subway announced that all classic footlongs would be priced at $6 each. In January 2018, the $5 promotion returned with a $4.99 footlong menu of five subs at participating locations. In September 2018, Subway announced that it would discontinue the $5 footlong promotion to boost franchise profits.

=== Italian Hero ===
In early 2017, Subway introduced its Italian Hero and advertised it with a campaign describing it as an authentic Italian(-American) sandwich. Created by their national creative agency MMB, two comedic spots feature Italian-American characters on and around the stoop of a tenement building, one including a cameo by sportscaster Dick Vitale. Another ad features Food Network's Jeff Mauro, the "Sandwich King", who is also Italian-American, discussing the nature and role of the different Italian meats and other ingredients.

=== "Refresh" ===
In July 2021, Subway debuted its "Refresh" campaign featuring: Tom Brady, Stephen Curry, Serena Williams, and Megan Rapinoe. According to the New York Post, some Subway franchisees requested Rapinoe be pulled from the ads following the 2020 Olympics and Trump's attacks on her and the women's national soccer team, claiming her testimonial caused sales to dip and harmed the stores' reputation.

== Sponsorships ==
Subway has sponsored a number of sports events, particularly NASCAR races, including the Subway 300 (2001), Subway 400 (2002–2004), Subway 500 (2003–2007), Subway Fresh 500 (2005–2013) and the Subway Firecracker 250 (2009–2016). Subway sponsored the Subway Super Series ice hockey tournament from 2009 to 2014. In September 2022, Subway secured a three-year partnership deal with Football Australia for the naming rights of the men's national football teams as the Subway Socceroos, Subway Olyroos, Subway Young Socceroos, and Subway Joeys. The deal also includes Subway becoming the official partner of the Matildas and the Australia Cup.

== Animal welfare ==
In December 2015, Subway committed to eliminating battery cage eggs from its North American supply chain by the end of 2025. In January 2022, it was criticized by the animal welfare organization the Open Wing Alliance for failing to report progress on its cage-free transition. In August 2025, a representative of The Humane League stated that Subway leadership refused to engage with the organization about its cage-free commitment. A month later, Subway announced that it would eliminate caged eggs from its U.S. locations by November 2025 and its Canadian locations by the end of the year.

In 2017, Subway faced a nationwide campaign against its use of fast-growing broiler chickens led by high school activist Lia Hyman in coordination with The Humane League. On April 20, 2017, Hyman and a group of activists delivered more than 53,000 signatures from campaign supporters at a demonstration outside Subway's headquarters in Connecticut.

Following the demonstration, Subway released a chicken welfare policy requiring its U.S. chicken products to be produced in alignment with Global Animal Partnership (GAP) standards by 2024, including enhanced living environments, increased activity levels, optimized stocking density, and improved slaughter methods. However, World Animal Protection reported in 2024 that Subway continued to practice low broiler welfare standards in its European supply chain.

== Controversies ==
=== Hepatitis A contamination ===
In September 1999, at least 32 customers in Seattle contracted hepatitis A after eating food contaminated with the virus at two Subway outlets. The virus is spread by eating or drinking food or water contaminated with infected feces. Subsequent investigations found that staff failed to adhere to thorough hand washing and the use of plastic gloves during food preparation. A class-action lawsuit on behalf of 31 victims was resolved for $1.6 million. The most seriously affected victim—a 6-year-old boy—suffered acute liver failure and required a liver transplant. He was awarded $10 million in an out-of-court settlement in 2001. A similar outbreak of hepatitis A in 1996 had also involved a Subway outlet in Seattle, although no legal action had resulted.

=== Sandwich size ===
On February 2, 2007, KNXV-TV (with the help of the Arizona Department of Weights and Measures) reported that three of Subway's "Giant Sub" sandwiches, normally each 3 feet (91 cm) long, were actually only 2 ft 7.9 in, 2 ft 8.2 in, and 2 ft 8.5 in (81.0, 81.9, and 82.6 cm) long. Under Arizona regulations, objects cannot be more than 3% shorter than their advertised length; a "three-foot" sub must be at least 2 feet 10.92 inches (88.70 cm) long.

=== Franchise relations ===
In 1995, Subway Sandwich Shops, Fred DeLuca, Peter Buck, and Doctor's Associates Inc. were held liable for breach of contract. An Illinois jury awarded more than $10 million in damages to Nicholas and Victoria Jannotta after finding lease and contract violations. The plaintiffs claimed the defendants had misrepresented the asset value of Subway Sandwich Shops (a leasing company used by Doctor's Associates for franchising purposes) while negotiating a 1985 lease agreement.

In 1989, the U.S. Small Business Administration refused small business loans to Subway franchise owners until Subway removed a contract clause which gave it the power to seize and purchase any franchise without cause. The Dallas Morning News reported Subway had seized American soldier Leon Batie Jr.'s Subway stores in 2006 while he was serving in Afghanistan. He had been deployed to support Operation Enduring Freedom in March 2005, three years after buying his first restaurant. Batie alleged Subway had violated the U.S. Servicemembers Civil Relief Act. He filed a federal lawsuit against Subway, which was dismissed. He then filed suit in state court in Dallas County, Texas. Both parties settled on "mutually agreeable" and confidential terms in January 2010.

In October 2010, Subway franchisees in the United Kingdom lost a high court appeal against paying standard VAT on all toasted subs, as required by HM Revenue and Customs.

=== Trademark disputes ===
On January 31, 2011, Subway lawyer Valerie Pochron wrote to Casey's General Stores, a chain of Iowa-based convenience stores, demanding that the small chain cease using the term "footlong" in advertisements for its 12-inch sandwiches. Casey's General Stores Inc. filed a petition seeking a legal declaration that the word "footlong" is generic. Before serving its complaint on Subway, Casey's voluntarily dismissed its action, ending the litigation.

Subway's trademark application for "footlong" has yet to be approved by the federal government. Subway has abandoned two attempts to register it with the United States Patent and Trademark Office twice.

=== Ingredients ===
Subway removed azodicarbonamide, an EU-banned potential carcinogen, from its bread after food blogger and activist Vani Hari gathered more than 50,000 signatures in a petition drive.

In August 2015, Vani Hari again petitioned Subway in conjunction with Natural Resources Defense Council, Friends of the Earth, the Center for Food Safety, U.S. Public Interest Research Group to commit to buying meat produced without the routine use of antibiotics and to provide a timeline for doing so. In October 2015, Subway announced it would transition to chicken raised without antibiotics in 2016 and turkey within the following 2–3 years, and would also transition beef and pork raised without antibiotics by 2025.

In 2020, the Supreme Court of Ireland ruled that Subway bread had too high a sugar content to be classed as bread, and had to be classed as cake.

=== Soy protein in chicken products ===
In 2017, Canadian Broadcasting Corporation (CBC) investigated chicken sold by five fast-food restaurants. DNA testing of two Subway chicken items found 53.6% and 42.8% chicken DNA, with the remainder being mostly soy. Subway disputed CBC's report and demanded that it be retracted, while investigating with its supplier.

In April 2017, Subway filed a $210 million lawsuit against CBC alleging "recklessly and maliciously" publication.The CBC stood by its reports, citing independent and credible experts. In November 2019, Subway's lawsuit against the CBC was dismissed through anti-SLAPP legislation, as CBC's reporting was deemed to be a matter of public interest. In January 2021 the Ontario Court of Appeal overturned the decision dismissing the lawsuit. The Supreme Court of Canada denied leave for appeal, so the matter has been returned to the Superior Court of Justice for trial.

=== Underpaying workers ===
In 2019, the Fair Work Ombudsman found that 17 Australian-based Subway franchises had failed to pay the employees minimum wages, casual loadings, holiday and overtime rates, and did not issue proper pay slips or keep proper employment records. The investigation resulted in over $81,000 being recovered in unpaid wages for over 160 employees.

=== Calls for boycott over the 2022 Russian invasion of Ukraine ===
Following the 2022 Russian invasion of Ukraine, Subway was criticized for not divesting or scaling back its operations in Russia, unlike most of its competitors. Ukraine's National Agency on Corruption Prevention stated that Subway continues advertising in Russia and collecting payments from its Russian franchisees, and listed Subway among International Sponsors of War in January 2024. Despite the list being withdrawn following diplomatic pressure, in June 2024, Subway announced the termination of its Russian franchise agreements, and in August 2025, the former Russian franchisee, having lost the Subway trademark rights, rebranded to Subjoy.

== See also ==
- List of restaurant chains
- List of submarine sandwich restaurants
