= List of Bowdoin College people =

This is a list of notable people associated with Bowdoin College in Brunswick, Maine. Itincludes alumni, faculty, and honorary degree recipients.

== Presidents of Bowdoin ==
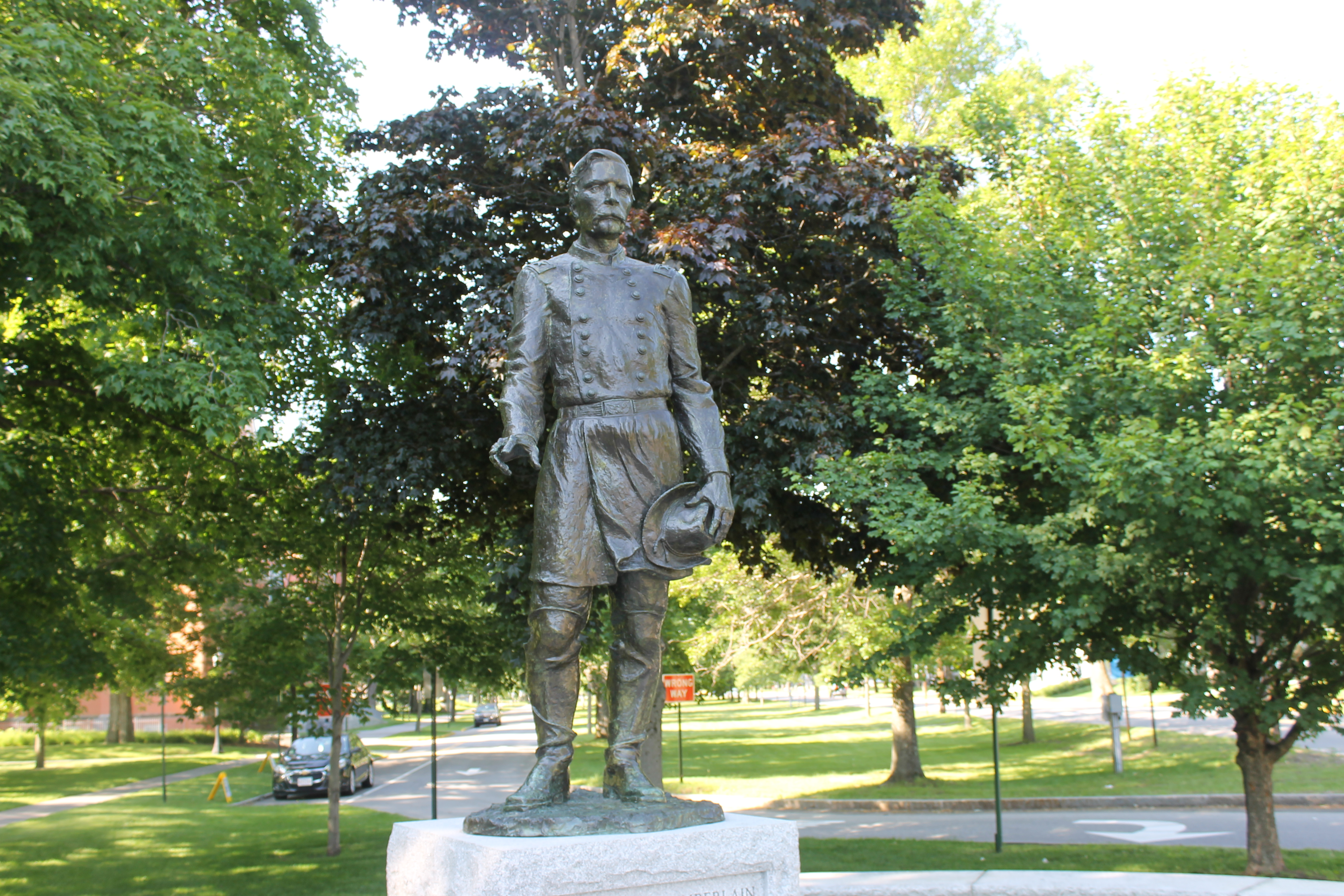
Joshua L. Chamberlain statue near the entrance to Bowdoin College

1. Joseph McKeen (1802–07)
2. Jesse Appleton (1807–19)
3. William Allen (1820–39)
4. Leonard Woods (1839–66)
5. Samuel Harris (1867–71)
6. Joshua Chamberlain (1871–83)
7. William DeWitt Hyde (1885–1917)
8. Kenneth C.M. Sills (1918–52)
9. James S. Coles (1952–67)
10. Roger Howell, Jr. (1969–78)
11. Willard F. Enteman (1978–80)
12. A. LeRoy Greason (1981–90)
13. Robert Hazard Edwards (1990–2001)
14. Barry Mills (2001–2015)
15. Clayton Rose (2015–2023)
16. Safa Zaki (2023–present)

== Distinguished graduates ==
Selected Bowdoin Alumni

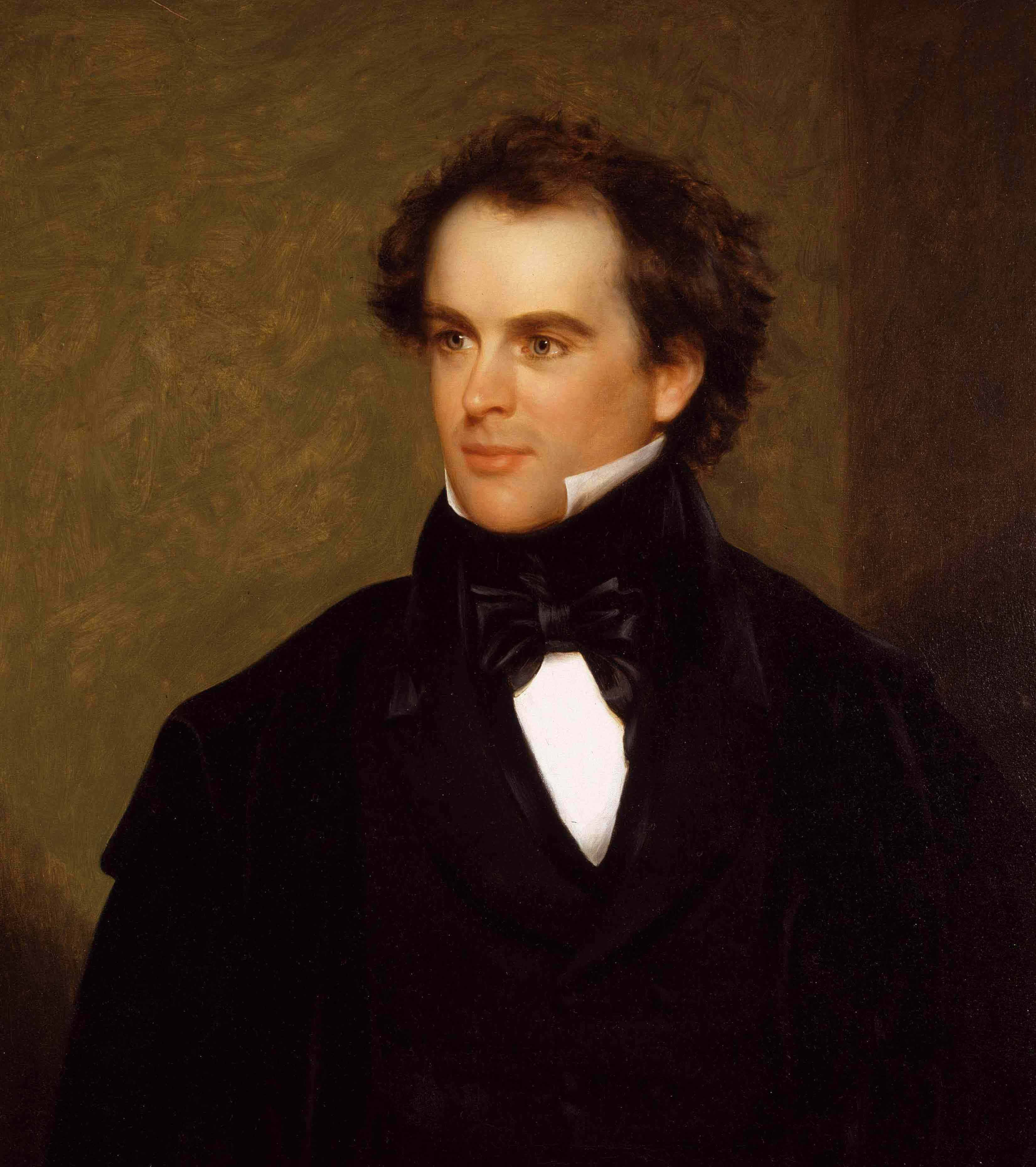
Poet and author, Nathaniel Hawthorne, class of 1825

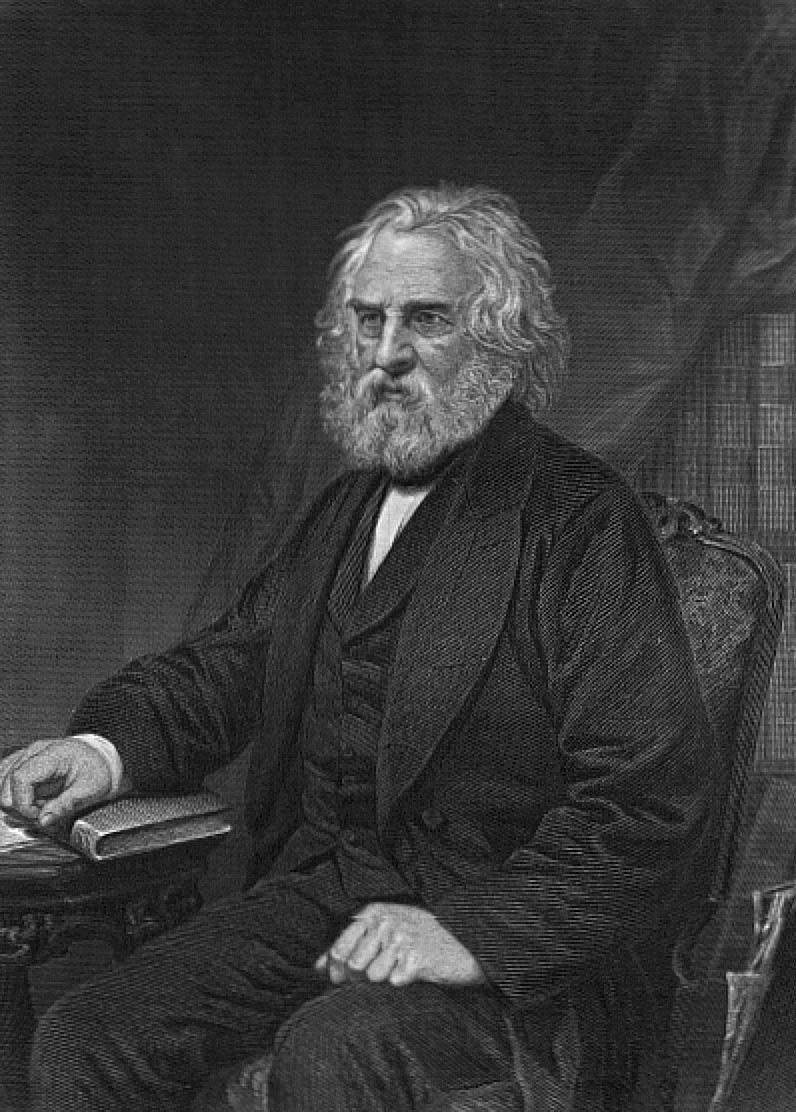
Author and poet, Henry Wadsworth Longfellow, class of 1825

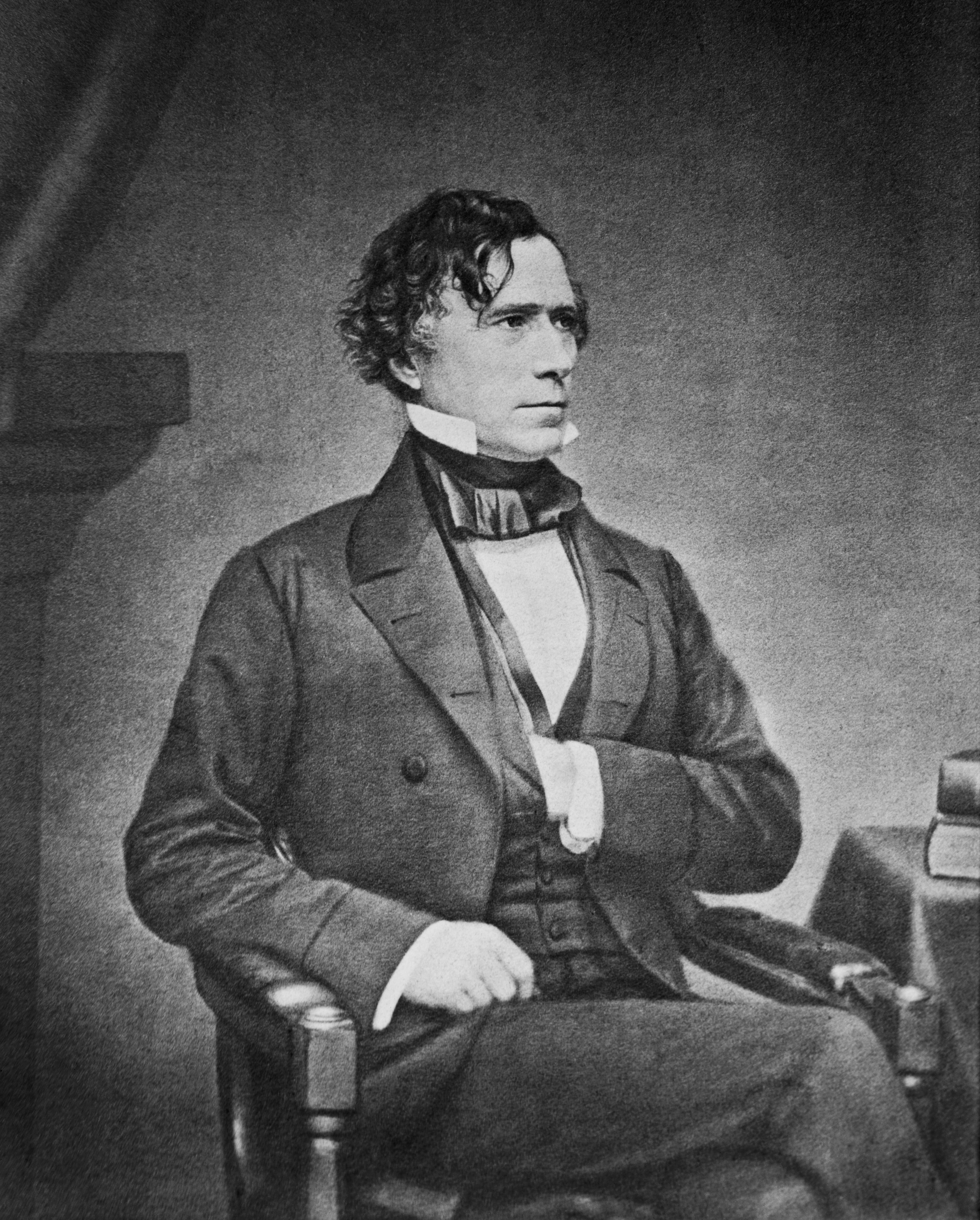
14th President of the United States, Franklin Pierce, class of 1824

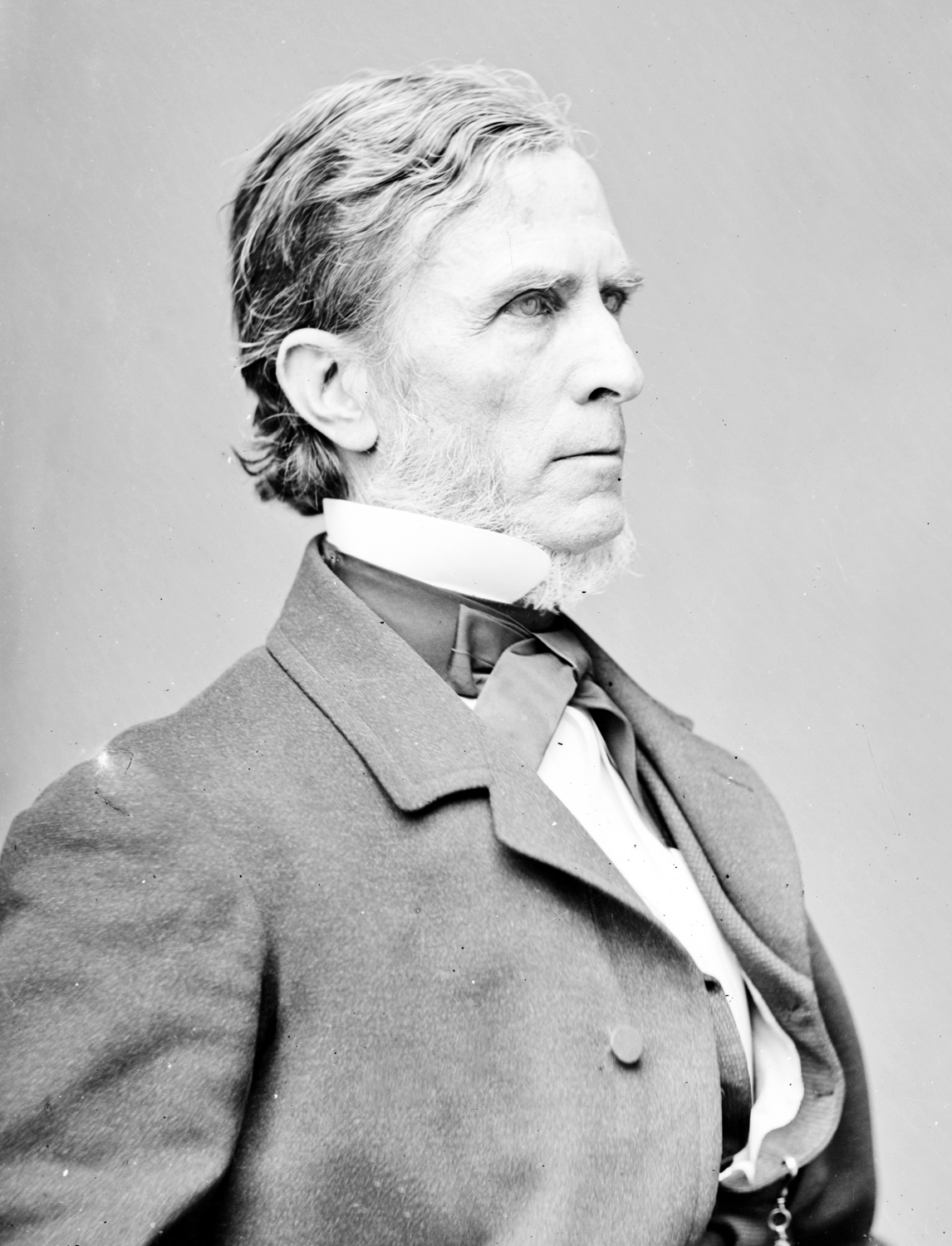
Secretary of Treasury under President Abraham Lincoln, William Fessenden, class of 1823

Founder of Standard & Poor's (S&P), Henry Varnum Poor, class of 1835

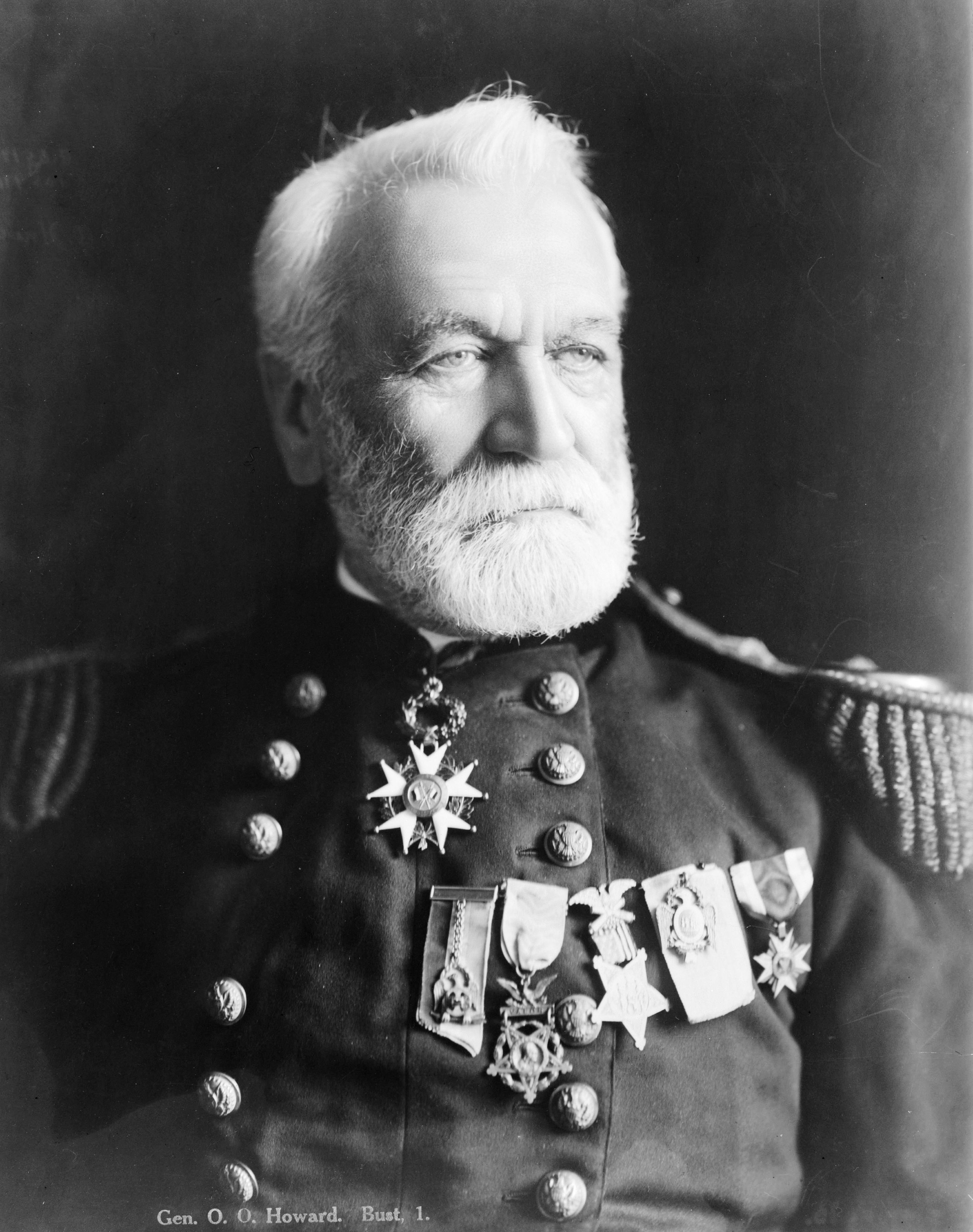
Civil War General and founder of Howard University, Oliver Otis Howard, class of 1850

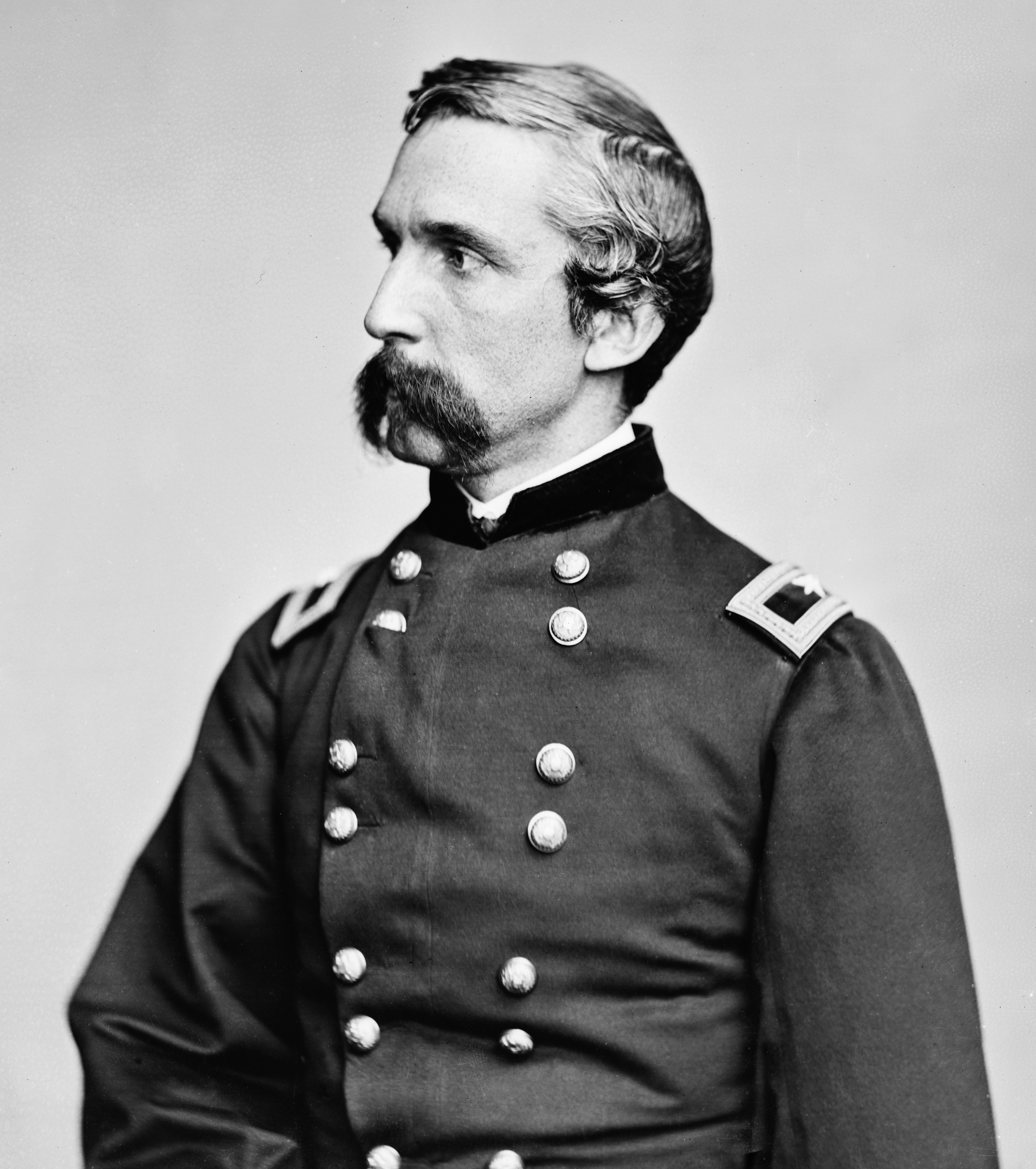
Civil War Hero and General, governor of Maine, and president of Bowdoin, Joshua Chamberlain, class of 1852

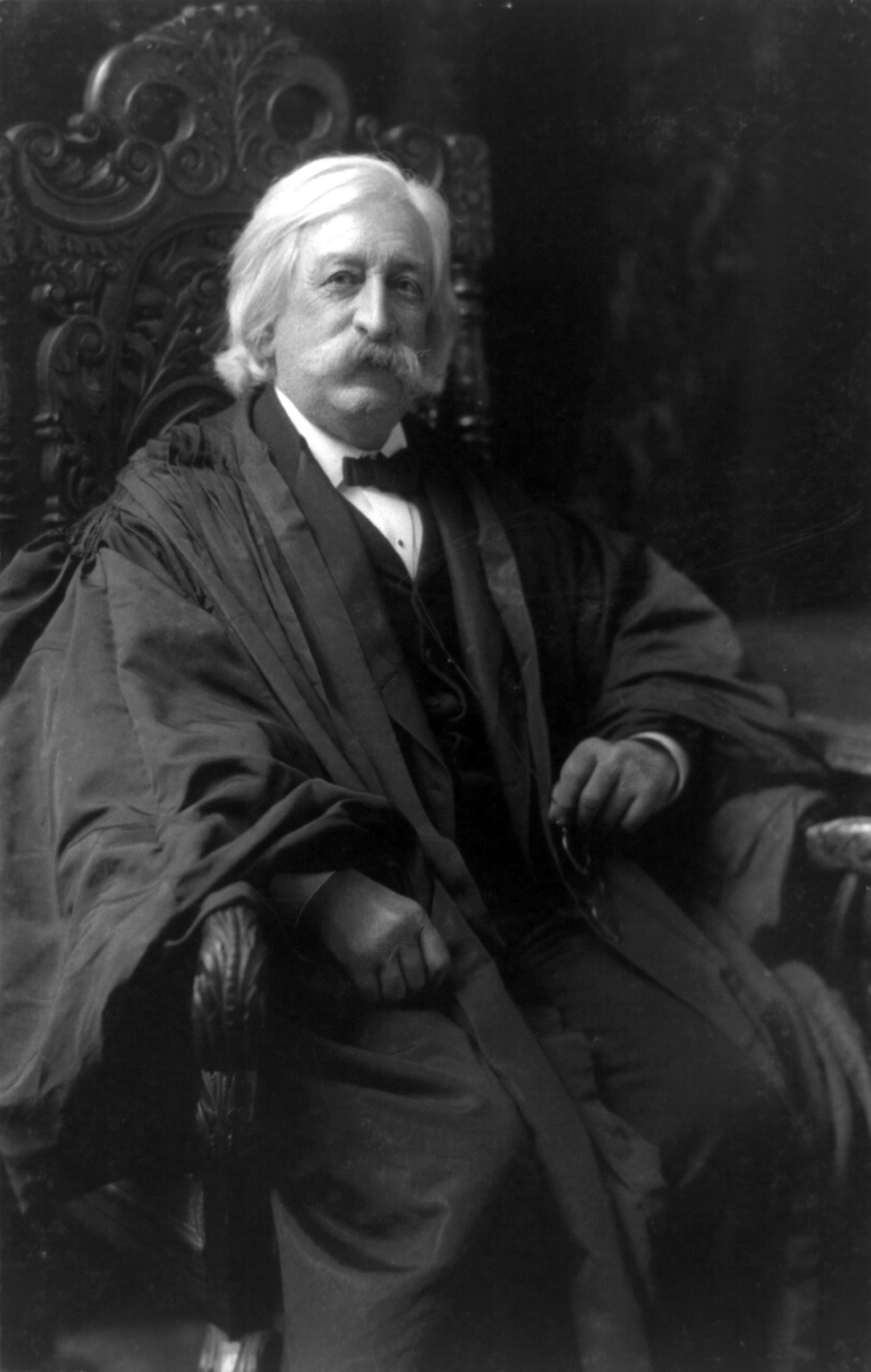
8th Chief Justice of the United States Supreme Court, Melville Fuller, class of 1853

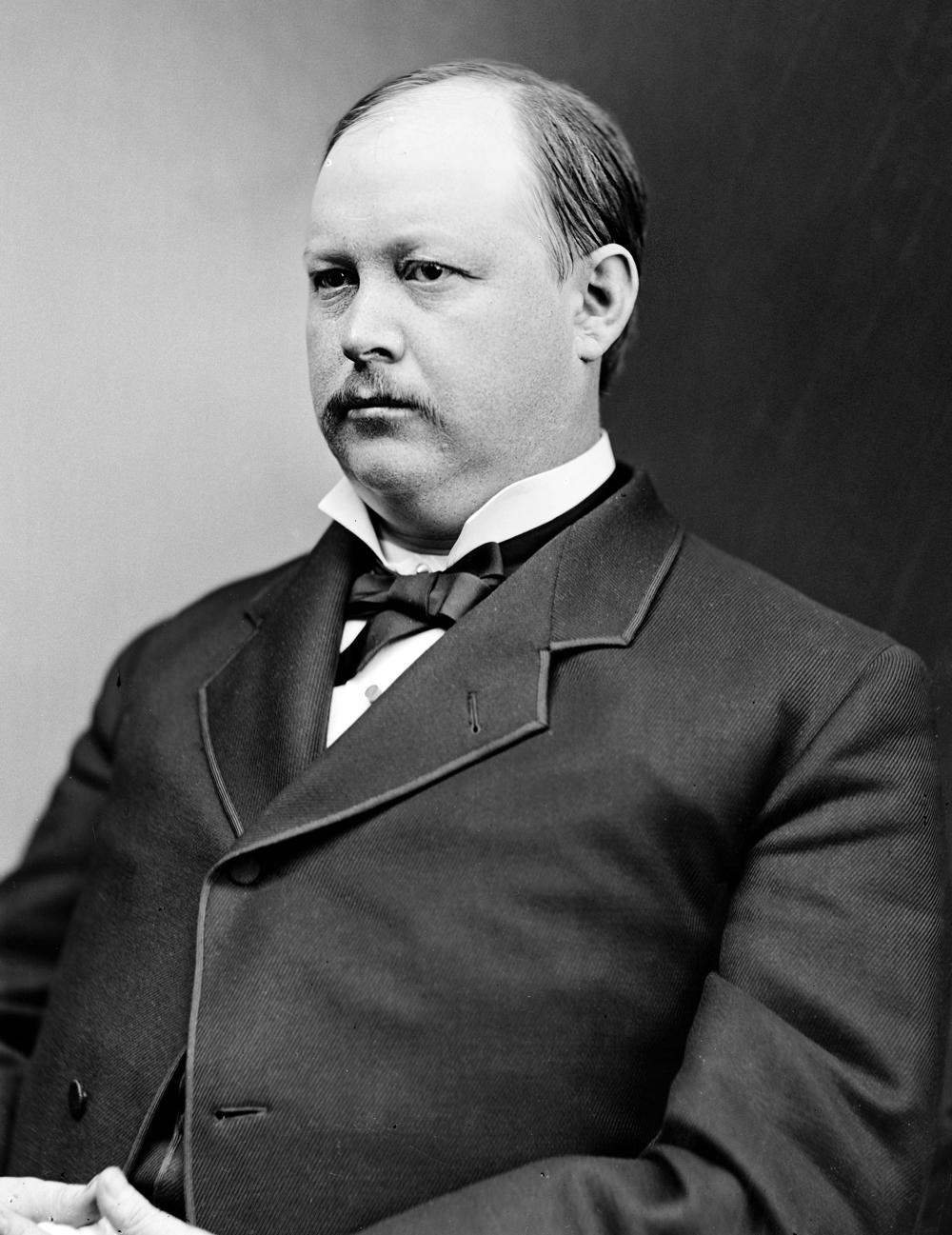
Speaker of the U.S. House of Representatives, Thomas Brackett Reed, class of 1860

Co-founder of Mayo Clinic, Augustus Stinchfield, class of 1868

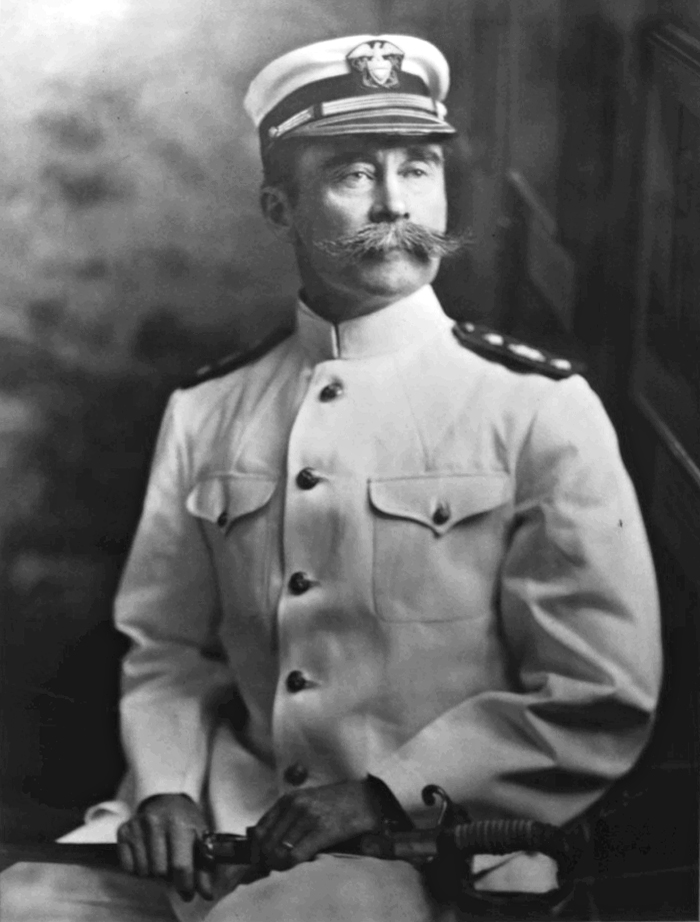
Leader of the first expedition to the North Pole, Robert Peary, class of 1877

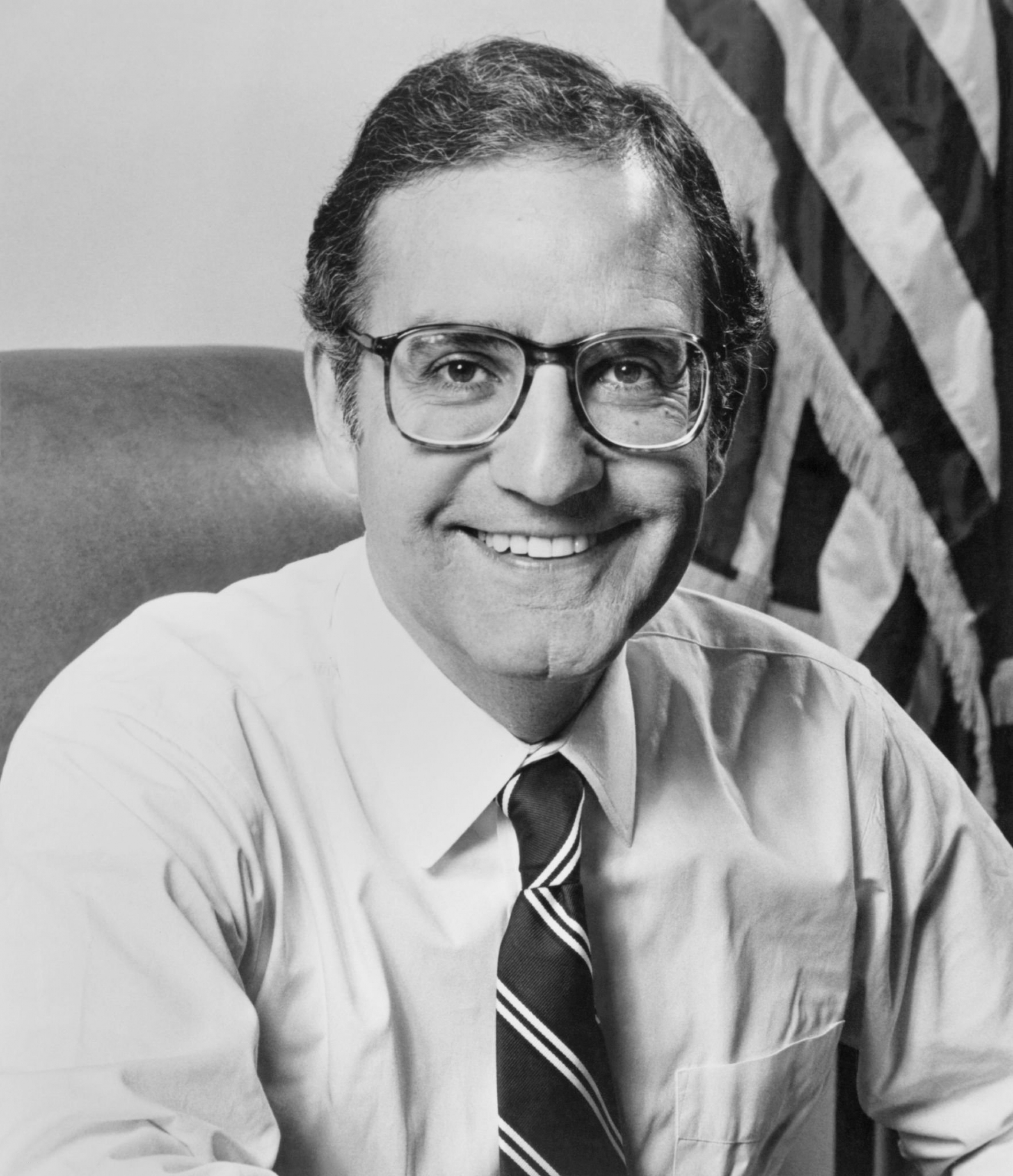
Former Senate Majority Leader, George Mitchell, class of 1954

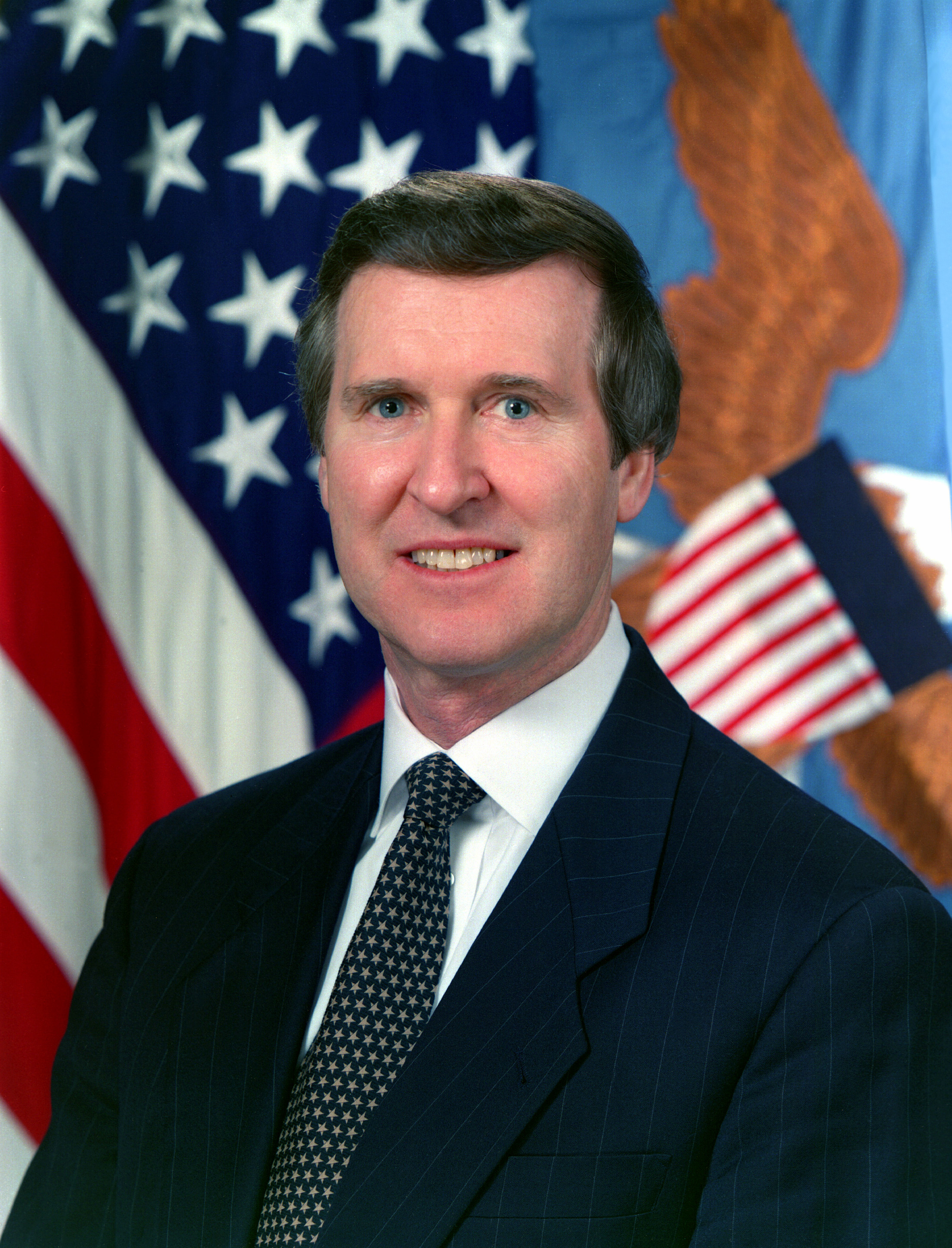
Former Senator and Secretary of Defense under President Bill Clinton, Bill Cohen, class of 1962

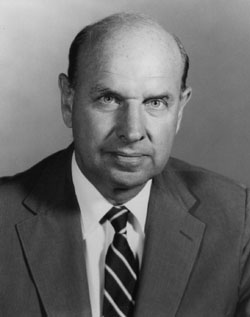
Former U.S. ambassador to the United Nations, Thomas R. Pickering, class of 1953

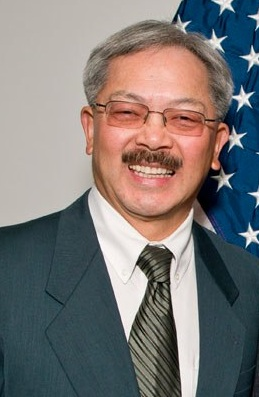
43rd mayor of San Francisco, Ed Lee, class of 1974

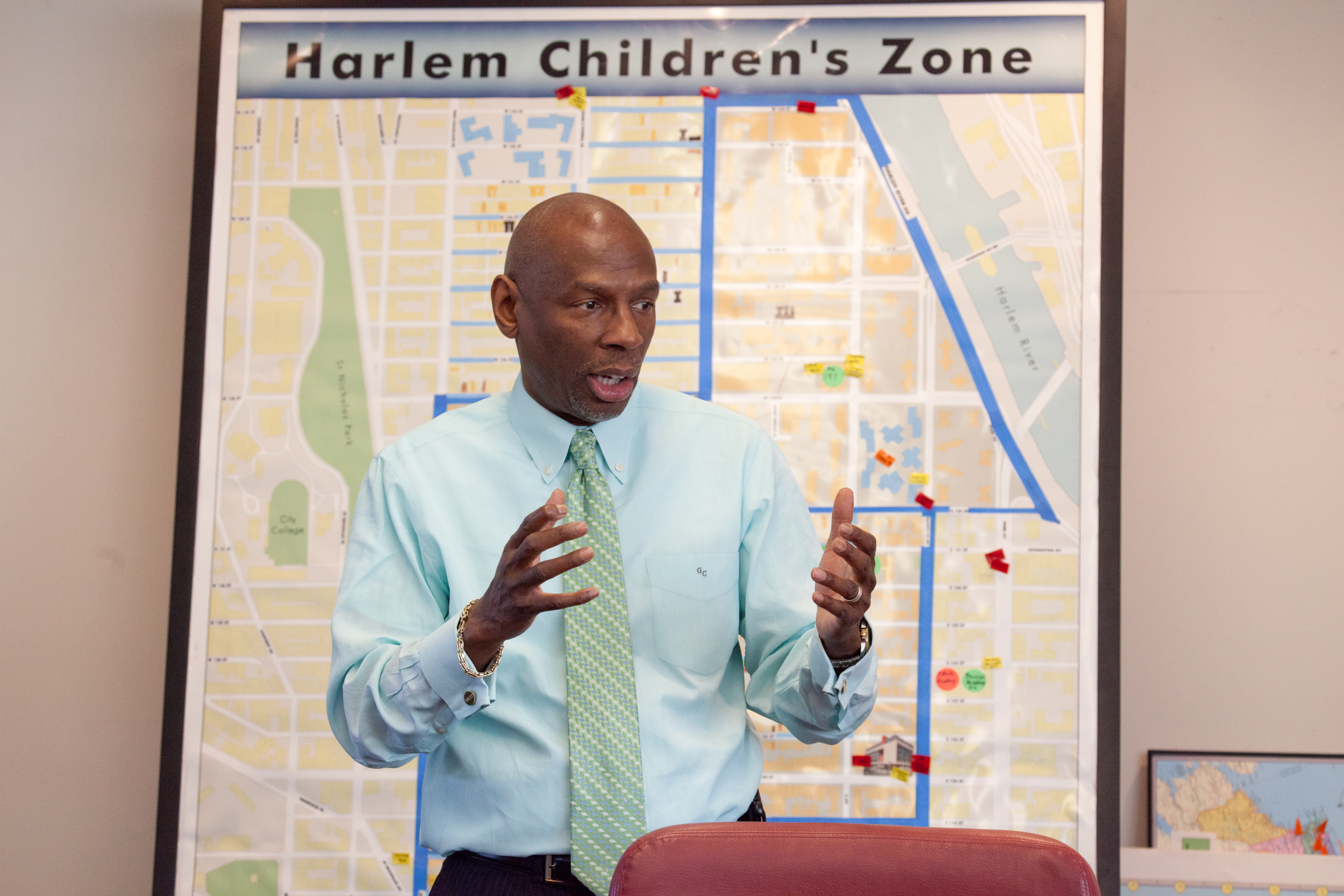
Harlem Children's Zone CEO, Geoffrey Canada, class of 1974

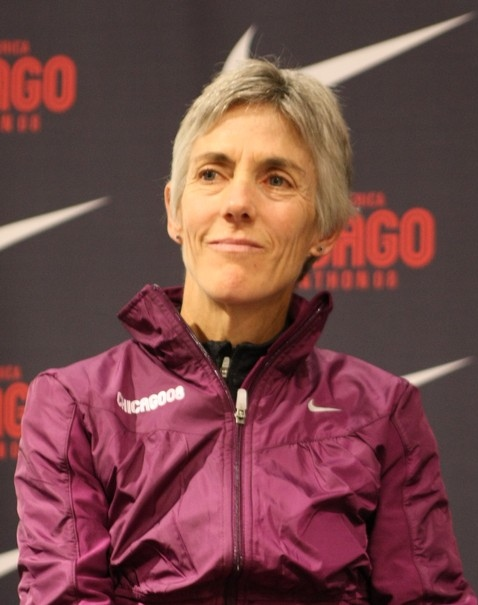
Olympic gold medalist and world record holding marathon runner, Joan Benoit Samuelson, class of 1979

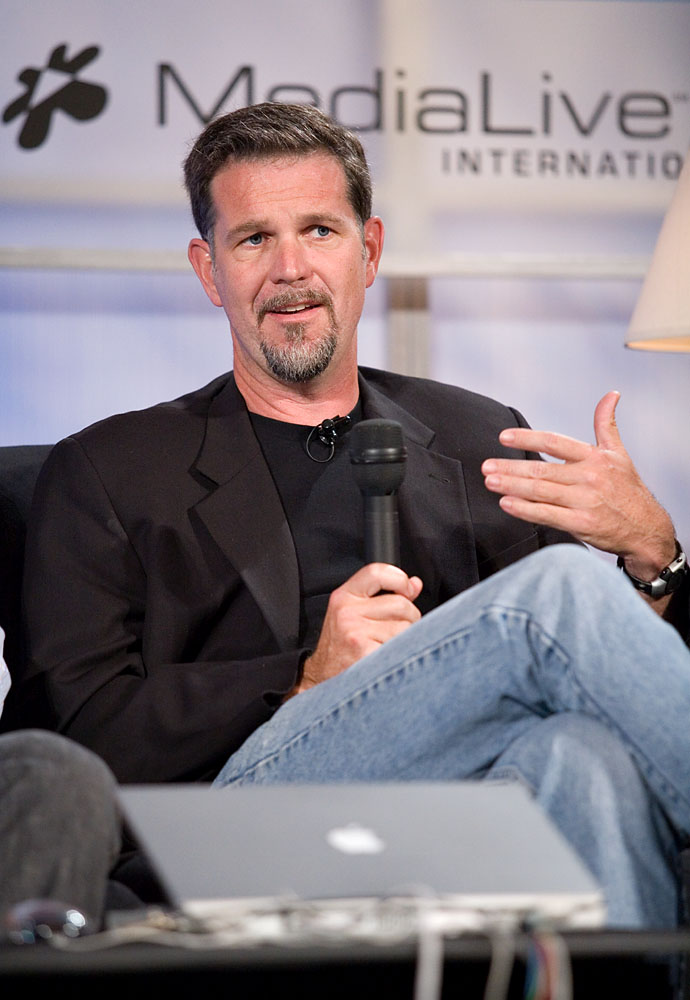
Founder and CEO of Netflix, Reed Hastings, class of 1983

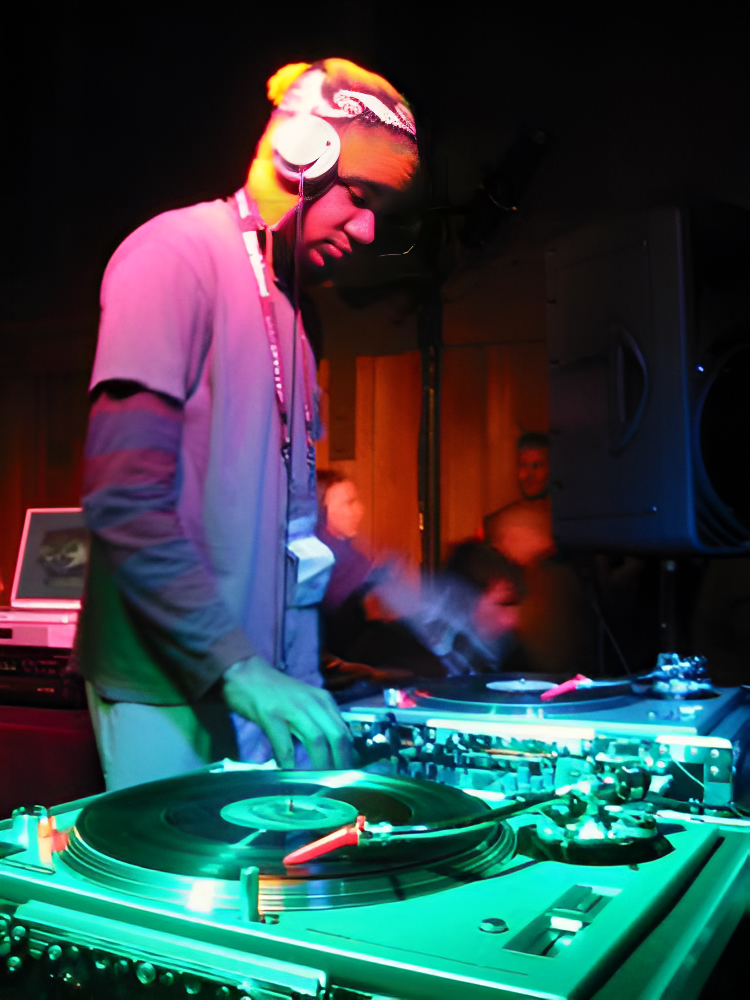
Musician DJ Spooky, class of 1992

=== Arts and letters ===
Note: individuals who belong in multiple sections appear in the most relevant section.

==== Literature and poetry ====
- Seba Smith 1818, humorist, creator of the fictional character Major Jack Downing
- Jacob Abbott 1820, academic and author of 180 books, primarily children's books
- Henry Wadsworth Longfellow 1825, world-renowned poet; professor at Bowdoin (1829–31) and Harvard University (1831–54); memorialized in the Poets' Corner at Westminster Abbey; namesake, along with Hawthorne, of Bowdoin's main library
- Nathaniel Hawthorne 1825, acclaimed author of classic novels The Scarlet Letter (1850) and The House of the Seven Gables (1851); namesake, along with Longfellow, of Bowdoin's main library
- Charles Asbury Stephens 1869, prolific author of children's stories for The Youth's Companion
- Arlo Bates 1876, novelist, poet, and professor at MIT
- Robert P. T. Coffin 1915, Rhodes Scholar, winner of the Pulitzer Prize for Poetry (1936), and Bowdoin professor (1934–55)
- Artine Artinian 1931, French literature scholar
- John Gould 1931, novelist, humorist, and columnist
- James Bassett 1934, journalist and author of the best-selling novel In Harm's Way (1962)
- Lawrence Sargent Hall 1936, novelist, short-story writer, and Bowdoin professor who won the O. Henry Award (1960)
- Richard Hooker 1945, doctor and author of the novel M*A*S*H (1968)
- Willis Barnstone 1948, four-time Pulitzer Prize-nominated poet
- Paul Batista 1970, trial lawyer, television personality, and author
- Rinker Buck, 1972, author
- Robin McKinley 1975, fantasy author of the Newbery Medal-winning The Hero and the Crown (1985)
- Douglas Kennedy 1976, novelist
- Charlotte Agell 1981, author
- Walter H. Hunt 1981, science fiction author
- Taylor Mali 1987, slam poet and teaching activist
- Martha McPhee 1987, novelist, nominated for the National Book Award (2002)
- Meredith Hall 1993, best-selling author of Without a Map (2007)
- Anthony Doerr 1995, novelist; author of All the Light We Cannot See (2014), which won the Pulitzer Prize for Fiction (2015) and was nominated for the National Book Award; writer-in-residence of the state of Idaho (2007–2010)
- Claudia La Rocco 2000, poet
- Jay Caspian Kang 2002, writer
- Kelly Kerney 2002, author

==== Journalism and nonfiction writing ====
- John Stevens Cabot Abbott 1825, biographer of Napoleon Bonaparte (1855)
- John Brown Russwurm 1826, third black college graduate in the United States; founder of Freedom's Journal, America's first black newspaper (1827); governor of the Republic of Maryland (later part of Liberia) (1836–41)
- Charles Beecher 1834, author, minister, and abolitionist; brother of the author Harriet Beecher Stowe, the minister Henry Ward Beecher, and educator Catharine Beecher
- Edward Stanwood 1861
- Edward Page Mitchell 1871, editor-in-chief of The New York Sun (1903–26)
- Hodding Carter 1927, progressive journalist and winner of the Pulitzer Prize (1946)
- Francis Russell 1933, historian, best known for his work on Warren Harding
- Arthur Stratton 1935, author and historian
- John Rich 1939, NBC News war correspondent
- Marcus Merriman 1962, historian, best known for his work on Mary, Queen of Scots
- Tom Cassidy 1972, CNN anchor (1981–89) and founder of the weekend news program Pinnacle
- Geoffrey Canada 1974, author and activist; president and CEO of the Harlem Children's Zone
- Alvin Hall 1974, financial advisor, author, and BBC television presenter
- Cynthia McFadden 1978, ABC News anchor of Primetime (2004–14) and Nightline (2005–14); NBC News senior legal & investigative correspondent (2014–present)
- Andrew Serwer 1981, Fortune Magazine Managing Editor (2006–present)
- Judy Fortin 1983, CNN Headline News anchor (1990–2006); medical correspondent (2006–present)
- Brian Farnham 1993, editor-in-chief of Time Out New York (2006–08)
- Thomas Kohnstamm 1998, author and travel writer
- New York Times Justice Department reporter Katie Benner (1999)
- Evan Gershkovich 2014, journalist

==== Film and television ====
- Phillips Lord 1925, radio personality, writer and actor
- Albert Dekker 1927, actor
- Gary Merrill 1937, actor
- William H. Brown Jr. 1939, television director and producer
- Burt Kwouk OBE 1953, British actor
- Ned Dowd 1972, actor and film producer
- John Davis 1975, film producer
- Douglas Kennedy 1976, film producer
- Kary Antholis 1984, Academy Award-winning filmmaker and executive at HBO Films
- Marcus Giamatti 1984, actor
- Brad Anderson 1986, filmmaker
- Angus Wall 1988, two-time Academy Award-winning editor
- Paul Adelstein 1991, actor
- Hayes MacArthur 1999, actor and comedian; husband of actress Ali Larter
- Hari Kondabolu 2004, stand-up comedian; featured several times on Comedy Central and on late night network television; writer/correspondent on Totally Biased with W. Kamau Bell (2012–13)

==== Music ====
- Paul "DJ Spooky" Miller 1992, trip-hop musician, turntablist and producer
- Michael J. Merenda, Jr. 1998, singer-songwriter with the alternative folk band The Mammals

==== Art and photography ====
- Jere Abbott 1920, art museum director who helped establish the Museum of Modern Art
- Harley Schwadron 1964, cartoonist
- Stephen Hannock 1974, landscape painter
- Kevin Bubriski 1975, documentary photographer
- Todd Siler 1975, visual artist and researcher of creativity
- Abelardo Morell 1977, photographer

=== Government ===
Note: individuals who belong in multiple sections appear in the most relevant section.

==== Presidents ====
- Franklin Pierce 1824, congressman (1833–37) and senator (1837–42) from New Hampshire; 14th President of the United States (1853–57); namesake of Franklin Pierce University in New Hampshire

==== U.S. cabinet secretaries ====
- William Fessenden 1823, congressman (1841–43) and senator (1854–64, 1865–69) from New Hampshire; Secretary of the Treasury under President Abraham Lincoln (1864–65)
- Hugh McCulloch 1827, Secretary of the Treasury under Presidents Abraham Lincoln (1865), Andrew Johnson (1865–69) and Chester A. Arthur (1884–85)
- Bill Cohen 1962, congressman (1972–78) and senator (1978–97) from Maine; Secretary of Defense under President Clinton (1997–2001)

==== U.S. governors ====
- Robert P. Dunlap 1815, governor of Maine (1834–38) and congressman from Maine (1843–47)
- Richard H. Vose 1822, governor of Maine (1841) and president of the Maine state senate
- William G. Crosby 1823, governor of Maine (1853–55)
- John Fairfield 1826, congressman (1835–38) and senator (1843–47) from Maine; governor of Maine (1839–43)
- Alonzo Garcelon 1836, Civil War general, Maine governor (1879–80)
- John Andrew 1837, governor of Massachusetts (1861–66) responsible for the formation of the 54th Massachusetts during the Civil War
- Frederick Robie 1841, governor of Maine (1883–87)
- La Fayette Grover 1846, governor of Oregon (1871–77); congressman (1859) and senator (1877–83) from Oregon
- Joshua Lawrence Chamberlain 1852, Bowdoin College professor (1855–62), Civil War hero, Medal of Honor recipient (for valor on Little Round Top on the second day of the Battle of Gettysburg), Maine governor (1867–71), and president of Bowdoin College (1871–83); a statue of Chamberlain now stands at the entrance to the college
- Wilmot Brookings 1855, first provisional governor of the Dakota Territory; namesake of the city and county of Brookings, both in South Dakota
- Henry B. Quinby 1869, governor of New Hampshire 1909–1911; physician
- William T. Cobb 1877, governor of Maine (1905–09)
- John Fremont Hill 1877, governor of Maine (1901–05)
- Percival Proctor Baxter 1898, governor of Maine (1921–24) and namesake of Baxter State Park
- James L. McConaughy 1911 (M.A.), governor of Connecticut (1947–48) and poet
- Horrace Hildreth 1925, governor of Maine (1944–48), US Ambassador to Pakistan (1953–57), and president of Bucknell University (1957–67)
- James B. Longley 1947, governor of Maine (1975–79)

==== U.S. senators ====
- George Evans 1815, congressman (1829–41) and senator (1841–47) from Maine
- James Bell 1822, senator from New Hampshire (1855–57)
- James Ware Bradbury 1825, senator from Maine (1847–53)
- Alpheus Felch 1827, Michigan governor (1846–47), senator from Michigan (1847–1853), professor of law at the University of Michigan, and namesake of Felch Township in Michigan
- John Hale 1827, congressman (1843–45) and senator (1847–53) from New Hampshire; ran against Franklin Pierce 1824 as the Free Soil Party candidate for president (1852)
- William Frye 1850, congressman (1871–81) and senator (1881–1911) from Maine; played a role in the founding of Bates College (1855)
- Paris Gibson 1851, senator from Montana (1901–05)
- William D. Washburn 1854, congressman (1879–85) and senator (1889–95) from Minnesota
- Charles Fletcher Johnson 1879, senator from Maine (1911–1917)
- Wallace White 1899, congressman (1916–31) and senator (1931–49) from Maine; Senate Minority Leader (1944–47); Senate Majority Leader (1947–49)
- Ralph Owen Brewster 1909, Maine governor (1925–29); congressman (1935–41) and senator (1941–53) from Maine
- Harold Hitz Burton 1909, senator from Ohio (1941–45); associate justice of the U.S. Supreme Court (1945–1958)
- Paul Douglas 1913, professor of economics at the University of Chicago (1920–42) and senator from Illinois (1949–67)
- George Mitchell 1954, senator from Maine (1982–95); Senate Majority Leader (1989–95); chairman of the Walt Disney Company (2004–06); winner of the Presidential Medal of Freedom (1999); Chancellor of Queen's University, Belfast

==== U.S. representatives ====
- Benjamin Randall 1809, congressman from Maine (1839–43)
- Bellamy Storer 1809, congressman from Ohio (1835–37) and law professor
- John Anderson 1813, congressman from Maine (1825–33) and mayor of Portland (1833–36,1842)
- John D. McCrate 1819, congressman from Maine (1845–47)
- John Otis 1823, congressman from Maine (1849–51)
- Samuel P. Benson 1825, congressman from Maine (1853–57) and Maine Secretary of State
- Jonathan Cilley 1825, congressman from Maine (1837–38) whose death in an 1838 duel with a Kentucky congressman prompted outrage and a congressional ban on the practice
- Cullen Sawtelle 1825, congressman from Maine (1845–47, 1849–51)
- Seargent Smith Prentiss 1826, congressman from Mississippi (1838–39)
- Owen Lovejoy 1832, congressman from Maine (1857–64); abolitionist participant in the Underground Railroad
- John Appleton 1834, US minister to Bolivia (1848–49), congressman from Maine (1851–53), assistant US secretary of state (1857–60), and US ambassador to Russia (1860–61)
- Timothy R. Young 1835, congressman from Illinois (1849–51)
- Samuel Fessenden 1834, congressman from Maine (1861–63)
- Charles H. Upton 1834, congressman from Virginia (1861–62)
- E. Wilder Farley 1836, congressman from Maine (1853–55)
- Frederick A. Pike 1837, congressman from Maine (1861–69)
- Lorenzo De Medici Sweat 1837, congressman from Maine (1863–65)
- Samuel Thurston 1843, first congressman from Oregon (1849–51)
- T.A.D. Fessenden 1845, congressman from Maine (1862–63)
- William W. Rice 1846, congressman from Massachusetts (1877–87)
- Isaac Newton Evans 1851, doctor and congressman from Pennsylvania (1877–79, 1883–87)
- John A. Peters 1885, United States representative from Maine (1913–22)
- Amos L. Allen 1860, congressman from Maine (1899–1911)
- Thomas Brackett Reed 1860, congressman from Maine (1877–99); speaker of the House (1889–91, 1895–99)
- De Alva S. Alexander 1870, congressman from New York (1896–1910) and United States district attorney from New York (1889–93)
- Daniel J. McGillicuddy 1881, congressman from Maine (1911–17)
- Frederick Stevens 1881, congressman from Minnesota (1897–1915)
- John A. Peters 1885, congressman from Maine (1913–22) and United States district attorney from Maine (1922–47)
- Simon M. Hamlin 1900, congressman from Maine (1935–37)
- Donald F. Snow 1901, congressman from Maine (1929–33)
- Robert Hale 1910, congressman from Maine (1943–59)
- James C. Oliver 1917, congressman from Maine (1937–43)
- Edward C. Moran, Jr. 1917, congressman from Maine (1933–37) and gubernatorial candidate (1928, 1930)
- Joseph L. Fisher 1935, congressman from Virginia (1975–81)
- Peter A. Garland 1945, congressman from Maine (1961–63)
- Thomas H. Allen 1967, Rhodes Scholar, mayor of Portland, Maine (1991–1992), and congressman from Maine (1997–2009)
- Tom Andrews 1976, congressman from Maine (1991–1995)
- Pat Meehan 1978, congressman from Pennsylvania (2011–2018)

==== Other prominent federal governmental officials ====
- Horatio Bridge 1825, commodore in the US Navy; chief of the Naval Bureau of Provisions & Clothing (1854–69)
- Sumner Increase Kimball 1855, organizer (1878) and superintendent (1878–1916) of the U.S. Life-Saving Service, precursor to the U.S. Coast Guard
- Ellis Spear 1858, Civil War general, U.S. commissioner of Patents
- Sumner Pike 1913, member of the U.S. Securities and Exchange Commission (1940–46) and member of the U.S. Atomic Energy Commission (1946–51)
- E. Frederick Morrow 1930, first African American to hold an executive position at the White House
- David F. Gordon 1971, director of Policy Planning at the U.S. State Department (2007–2009)
- Lawrence Lindsey 1976, professor of economics at Harvard, and director of the National Economic Council under President George W. Bush
- Khurram Dastgir Khan Minister for Defence, Pakistan (2017–present)

==== Ambassadors and other diplomats ====
- Wilhelm Haas 1953, former German ambassador to Israel, Japan, and the Netherlands
- Thomas Pickering 1953, US ambassador to Jordan (1974–78), Nigeria (1981–83), El Salvador (1983–85), Israel (1985–88), the United Nations (1989–92), India (1992–93), and Russia (1993–96); recipient of thirteen honorary degrees
- Laurence Pope 1967, US ambassador to Chad (1993–96)
- David Pearce 1972, US ambassador to Algeria (2008–11) and Greece (2013–2016)
- Christopher Hill 1974, US ambassador to Macedonia (1996–99), Poland (2000–2004), South Korea (2004–2005), and Iraq (2009–2010); assistant secretary of State for East Asian and Pacific Affairs and chief US negotiator with North Korea (2005–2009)
- Lawrence Butler 1975, US ambassador to Macedonia (2002–2005)

==== Mayors ====
- Samuel Merritt 1844, M.D., 13th mayor of Oakland, California (1867–69) and a founding Regent of the University of California (1868–1874)
- William LeBaron Putnam 1855, mayor of Portland, Maine (1869–70) and gubernatorial candidate (1888)
- Edwin M. Lee 1974, mayor of San Francisco, California (2011–2017); first Asian-American mayor in the city's history
- Stephen Laffey 1984, mayor of Cranston, R.I. (2002–07); candidate for U.S. Senate (2006)
- Zohran Mamdani 2014, 112th mayor of New York City, New York (2026–); member of the New York State Assembly (2021–2025)

==== City and state officials ====
- Stirling Fessenden 1896, chairman (1923–1929) and secretary-general (1929–1939) of the Shanghai Municipal Council
- Terry Hayes 1980, member of the Maine House of Representatives and Maine State Treasurer
- Hoddy Hildreth 1949, Member of the Maine House of Representatives and conservationist
- Peter Steinbrueck 1979, Seattle city councilman and activist
- Justin J. Pearson 2017, member of the Tennessee House of Representatives (2023–present)
- Morgan Rielly, member of the Maine House of Representatives (2020–present)

==== Activists ====
- DeRay Mckesson 2007, civil rights activist

=== Law ===
Note: individuals who belong in multiple sections appear in the most relevant section.

==== U.S. Supreme Court justices ====
- Melville Weston Fuller 1853, 8th chief justice of the United States (1888–1910)
- Harold Hitz Burton 1909, senator from Ohio (1941–45); associate justice of the U.S. Supreme Court (1945–1958)

==== Federal and state judges ====
- Josiah Pierce 1821, judge of probate for Cumberland County, Maine
- George Yeaton Sawyer 1826, justice of the New Hampshire Supreme Court (1855–1859)
- Thomas Drummond 1830, judge of the United States District Courts for the District (1850–1855) and Northern District (1855–1869) of Illinois and Court of Appeals for the Seventh Circuit (1869–1884)
- Amos Morrill 1834, judge of the United States District Court for the Eastern District of Texas (1872–1883)
- William LeBaron Putnam 1855, judge of the United States Court of Appeals for the First Circuit (1892–1917)
- Clarence Hale 1869, judge of the United States District Court for the District of Maine (1902–1934)
- Frank G. Farrington 1872, associate justice of the Maine Supreme Judicial Court (1928–1933)
- Charles F. Johnson 1879, judge of the United States Court of Appeals for the First Circuit (1917–1930)
- John A. Peters 1885, judge of the United States District Court for the District of Maine (1921–1953)
- John David Clifford Jr. 1910, judge of the United States District Court for the District of Maine (1947–1956)
- Ronald Rene Lagueux 1953, judge of the United States District Court for the District of Rhode Island (1986–2023)
- George J. Mitchell 1954, judge of the United States District Court for the District of Maine (1979–1980)
- Michael Anello 1965, judge of the United States District Court for the Southern District of California (2008–present)
- Berle M. Schiller 1965, judge of the United States District Court for the Eastern District of Pennsylvania (2000–2025)
- John A. Woodcock Jr. 1972, judge of the United States District Court for the District of Maine (2003–present)
- Jeffery P. Hopkins 1982, judge of the United States District Court for the Southern District of Ohio (2022–present)

==== Federal attorneys ====
- Amory Holbrook 1841, first United States attorney for the Oregon territory and senatorial candidate
- Pat Meehan 1978, United States attorney for the Eastern District of Pennsylvania (2001–08)

==== Legal academics and other legal figures ====
- Duncan Hollis, 1992, legal scholar and professor at Beasley School of Law
- Fred Fisher 1942, Boston attorney and figure in the Army-McCarthy hearings
- Dennis J. Hutchinson 1969, Rhodes Scholar, law clerk to US Supreme Court Justice William O. Douglas, professor of law at the University of Chicago, and biographer of Justice Byron White (1998)
- Cara H. Drinan, professor of law at The Catholic University of America's Columbus School of Law
- Karen Mill-Francis, retired Miami-Dade County judge and television arbitrator, Judge Karen

=== Military ===
- John F. Appleton 1860, Union Army colonel during the Civil War
- Joshua Lawrence Chamberlain 1852, Bowdoin College professor (1855–62), Civil War brigadier general, Medal of Honor recipient, Maine governor (1867–71), and president of Bowdoin College (1871–83)
- Michael J. Connor 1980, USN vice admiral, commander, Submarine Forces (2012–2015)
- Abraham Eustis 1806 (M.A.), officer during the War of 1812
- Francis Fessenden 1858, Union Army brigadier general during the Civil War
- James Deering Fessenden 1852, Union Army brigadier general during the Civil War
- Andrew Haldane 1941, USMC Silver Star recipient during World War II
- Charles Henry Howard 1859, Union Army officer and newspaper publisher
- Oliver Otis Howard 1850, Civil War major general, commissioner of the Freedmen's Bureau (1865–72), and founder and president of Howard University (1869–74)
- Thomas Hamlin Hubbard 1857, Civil War colonel, lawyer, financier, philanthropist
- Thomas Hyde 1861, Medal of Honor recipient during the Civil War and founder of Bath Iron Works (1884)
- Everett P. Pope 1941, USMC Medal of Honor recipient during World War II
- Ellis Spear 1858, Civil War colonel, U.S. commissioner of Patents
- Henry Clay Wood 1854, U.S. Army brigadier general who received the Medal of Honor for heroism at the Battle of Wilson's Creek

=== Science and medicine ===
- William Smyth 1822, professor of mathematics and philosophy at Bowdoin; author of popular textbooks on algebra, trigonometry, geometry and calculus (1833–59)
- John H. C. Coffin, 1834 and 1837, astronomer and educator at United States Naval Academy
- James Liddell Phillips 1860, D.D.(Hon.) 1878, medical missionary to India; Christian missionary founder of the Bible School at Midnapore
- Augustus Stinchfield 1868, co-founder of the Mayo Clinic
- George Edwin Lord 1869, doctor killed at the Battle of Little Big Horn in 1876
- Francis Robbins Upton 1875, mathematician and inventor; long-time associate of Thomas Edison; first student ever to receive a graduate degree from Princeton (1877)
- Edwin Hall 1875, physicist, discoverer of the Hall effect, used worldwide in sensors and has led more recently to the quantum Hall effect, the international standard defining the ohm in electrical resistance
- Robert Peary 1877, naval officer and leader of the first expedition to reach the North Pole (1909)
- Donald MacMillan 1898, member of the Peary expedition and pioneering Arctic explorer
- Philip Hunter Timberlake 1908, prolific entomologist and writer of scientific essays
- Malford W. Thewlis 1911, pioneer of gerontology and founder of the American Geriatrics Society
- Alfred Kinsey 1916, sex researcher, author of the controversial Kinsey Reports (1948, 1953), professor at Indiana University (1920–56), and founder of the Institute for Sex Research (1947)
- Myron Avery 1920, environmentalist instrumental in the creation of the Appalachian Trail
- Cornelius P. Rhoads 1920, pathologist and oncologist; winner of awards for his contributions to the field of oncology; the American Association for Cancer research named an award after him, which was later renamed following a scandal
- John Ripley Forbes 1938, conservationist and philanthropist of nature museums
- Paul Prucnal 1974, professor of electrical engineering at Princeton University
- J. Ward Kennedy 1955, cardiologist who made novel studies concerning the heart's pumping power
- Auden Schendler 1992, corporate environmentalist prominently featured in issues of Time and Businessweek
- Herbert Lovett, psychologist
- Sumner Jackson, medical doctor and member of the French Resistance in World War II

=== Athletics ===
- Whitey Witt, starting center fielder for the World Series-winning 1923 New York Yankees team
- Fred Tootell 1923, Olympic gold medalist in the hammer throw (1924)
- George Mitchell 1954, Senate majority leader (1989–95); in 2007 released the Mitchell Report concerning steroid abuses in Major League Baseball
- Fred Ahern 1974, NHL hockey player
- Dale Arnold 1979, two-time Emmy Award-winning sportcaster
- Joan Benoit Samuelson 1979, world record holder and winner of the Boston (1979, 1983), Olympic (1984) and Chicago (1985) marathons
- Rick Boyages 1985, head coach for William & Mary Tribe men's basketball (2000–2003)
- Joe Beninati 1987, television play-by-play announcer for the Washington Capitals (1994–present) and Major League Lacrosse (2001–present)
- Tom Ryan 1993, professional lacrosse player and coach
- Emily Levan 1995, elite marathon runner
- Jared Porter 2003, general manager of the New York Mets (2020–2021)
- Will Hanley 2012, professional basketball player in the Liga ACB in Spain
- Ben Brewster 2014, professional soccer player (2013–2017) and NCAA collegiate coach (2017–present)

=== Business ===
- Henry Varnum Poor 1835, founder of Standard & Poor's
- Jonathan Eveleth 1847, founder of first U.S. oil company
- Thomas Hyde 1861, Medal of Honor recipient and founder of Bath Iron Works (1884)
- Charles W. Morse 1877, ice, shipping and banking magnate; ruined the career of New York mayor Robert Van Wyck and helped spark the Panic of 1907
- Freelan Oscar Stanley 1877, co-inventor of the Stanley Steamer, and builder of the Stanley Hotel
- L. Brooks Leavitt 1899, investment banker, partner, Paine, Webber & Co., Overseer, Bowdoin College, donor to college library
- Harvey Dow Gibson 1902, Red Cross commissioner and president of the Manufacturers Trust Co; served on the board of the 1939 New York World's Fair
- Everett P. Pope 1941, Medal of Honor recipient, bank president, and longtime member (1977–87) and chairman of the college's board of trustees (1985–87)
- Charles Ireland, Jr. 1942, president of CBS (1971–72)
- Bernard Osher 1948, billionaire auctioneer of Butterfield & Butterfield and philanthropist
- Raymond S. Troubh 1950, independent financial consultant, general partner at Lazard (1961–74), and interim chairman at Enron (2002–2004)
- Peter Buck 1952, billionaire co-founder of the Subway sandwich chain (1965) and physicist
- George Mitchell 1954, chairman of the Walt Disney Company (2004–06)
- Leon Gorman 1956, president (1967–2001) and chairman (2001–present) of L. L. Bean
- David A. Olsen 1959, CEO of Johnson & Higgins (1990–97); vice chairman of Marsh & McLennan (1997) and then board member (1997–present)
- Kenneth Chenault 1973, president (1997–2001) and CEO (2001–2018) of American Express; the first African-American CEO of a Fortune 500 company
- Sheldon M. Stone 1974, Oaktree Capital Management founder and partner
- Stanley Druckenmiller 1975, billionaire financier and philanthropist; former business associate of George Soros
- Robert F. White 1977, founding member of Bain Capital
- John Studzinski 1978, American-British investment banker and philanthropist and CBE
- James "Jes" Staley 1979, former head of investment banking at JPMorgan Chase and former CEO of Barclays
- Reed Hastings 1983, founder (1997) and CEO (1997–present) of Netflix

=== Charity and nonprofit ===
- Geoffrey Canada 1974, author and activist; president and CEO of the Harlem Children's Zone
- John J. Studzinski 1978, investment banker and champion of the homeless and the arts; founder of the Genesis Foundation

=== Academia ===
Note: individuals who belong in multiple sections appear in the most relevant section.

==== College founders and presidents ====
- Nathan Lord 1809, president of Dartmouth College (1828–63)
- Alpheus Packard, Sr. 1819, professor (1824–65) and acting president (1882–84) of Bowdoin College
- William C. Larrabee 1828, president of DePauw University (1848–1849)
- William Henry Allen 1833, president of Dickinson College (1847–48) and Pennsylvania State University (1864–68)
- Samuel Harris 1833, president of Bowdoin College (1867–71) and Dwight Professor of Systematic Theology at Yale Divinity School (1871–95)
- Cyrus Hamlin 1834, co-founder of Robert College in Istanbul (1860); president of Middlebury College (1880–85)
- Alonzo Garcelon 1836, donor of Bates College (1855), Civil War general, Maine governor (1879–80)
- Daniel Raynes Goodwin 1832, served as thirteenth provost (highest academic and executive office) of University of Pennsylvania
- Laurie G. Lachance 1983, president, Thomas College (2012– )
- George Frederick Magoun 1841, first president of Iowa College, now Grinnell College (1865–1885)
- Oliver Otis Howard 1850, Civil War general, commissioner of the Freedmen's Bureau (1865–72), and founder and president of Howard University (1869–74)
- Kenneth Sills 1901, president of Bowdoin College (1918–52)
- Asa S. Knowles 1930, president of the University of Toledo and Northeastern University, and namesake of the building which houses the Northeastern School of Law
- Lawrence Lee Pelletier 1936, president of Allegheny College, and namesake of the school's library
- Robert W. Morse 1943, first president of Case Western Reserve University (1966–71)
- George Mitchell 1954, chancellor of Queen's University, Belfast
- Roger Howell, Jr. 1958, Rhodes Scholar, professor of History, and president of Bowdoin College (1969–78)
- Barry Mills 1972, president of Bowdoin College (2001–2015)
- Meredith Jung-En Woo 1980, professor at Northwestern University (1989–2000) and the University of Michigan (2001–present); dean of the College and Graduate School of Arts and Sciences at the University of Virginia (2008–2015); president of Sweet Briar College (2017–present); expert on Korean politics
- Paul A. Chadbourne professor 1858, President of University of Wisconsin, Williams College, and University of Massachusetts
- Adam S. Weinberg 1987, president of Denison University (2013–present)
- Herman Dreer, president of Douglass University in St. Louis, educational reformer and activist

==== Professors and scholars ====
- Calvin Ellis Stowe 1824, professor of religion at the Andover Theological Seminary, Dartmouth College and Bowdoin College; husband and literary agent of Harriet Beecher Stowe
- Henry Boynton Smith 1834, theologian and professor at Amherst College (1847–50) and the Union Theological Seminary (1850–74)
- Ezra Abbot 1840, influential biblical scholar and professor at the Harvard Divinity School (1872–84)
- Charles Carroll Everett 1850, theologian and philosopher; professor at (1869–78), and dean of (1878–1900), the Harvard Divinity School
- William Alfred Packard 1851, classical scholar and professor at Princeton University
- Jonathan Stanton 1856, ornithologist and professor at Bates College (1863–1906)
- Oliver Patterson Watts 1889, professor of chemistry at University of Wisconsin
- Boyd Bartlett 1917, military officer and physics professor at the United States Military Academy
- Robert Albion 1918, author and professor at Princeton University (1922–47) and at Harvard University (1948–65)
- Theophilus E. McKinney, Jr 1950, professor and university administrator
- Richard E. Morgan 1959, distinguished professor of Government at Bowdoin College (1969–2014)
- Peter Hayes 1968, Holocaust historian
- Bruce E. Cain 1970, Rhodes Scholar and Charles Louis Ducommun Professor at Stanford University (2012–present)
- Lyman Page 1978, astronomer, physicist, and professor at Princeton University
- Thomas Glave 1993, O. Henry Award-winning short story writer, essayist and English professor at Binghamton University

=== Religion ===
- Rev. Joshua Young, Unitarian minister who presided over the funeral of John Brown

=== Fictional alumni ===
- Hawkeye Pierce, the protagonist of Richard Hooker's novel, M*A*S*H (1968), attended a school based on Bowdoin; played by Donald Sutherland in the Academy Award-winning film version (1970) and by Alan Alda in the long-running TV series (1972–83)
- Dr. Wilbur Larch, the pro-choice doctor who raises Homer Wells, the protagonist of John Irving's novel, The Cider House Rules (1985); Michael Caine won an Academy Award when he portrayed him in the 1999 film version
- Homer Wells, the protagonist of John Irving's The Cider House Rules (1985), recipient of a Bowdoin degree forged by his mentor and father figure, Dr. Wilbur Larch; played by Tobey Maguire in the 1999 film version
- Forney Hull, the main love interest of the lead character in Billie Letts' novel, Where the Heart Is (1995); played by James Frain in the 2000 film version
- Derek Shepherd ("McDreamy"), a lead character played by Patrick Dempsey in the popular TV series Grey's Anatomy (2005–2015)
- Gilbert, a character in Paul Harding's Pulitzer Prize-winning novel Tinkers (2009), a semi-legendary literary figured who graduated from Bowdoin and is rumored to have been one of Nathaniel Hawthorne's classmates
- Horace Guilder, the villain in Justin Cronin's 2012 novel The Twelve, mentions having running cross-country at Bowdoin.
- Paige Hardaway, a character from the Netflix show Atypical, briefly attended Bowdoin.

== Honorary degree recipients ==
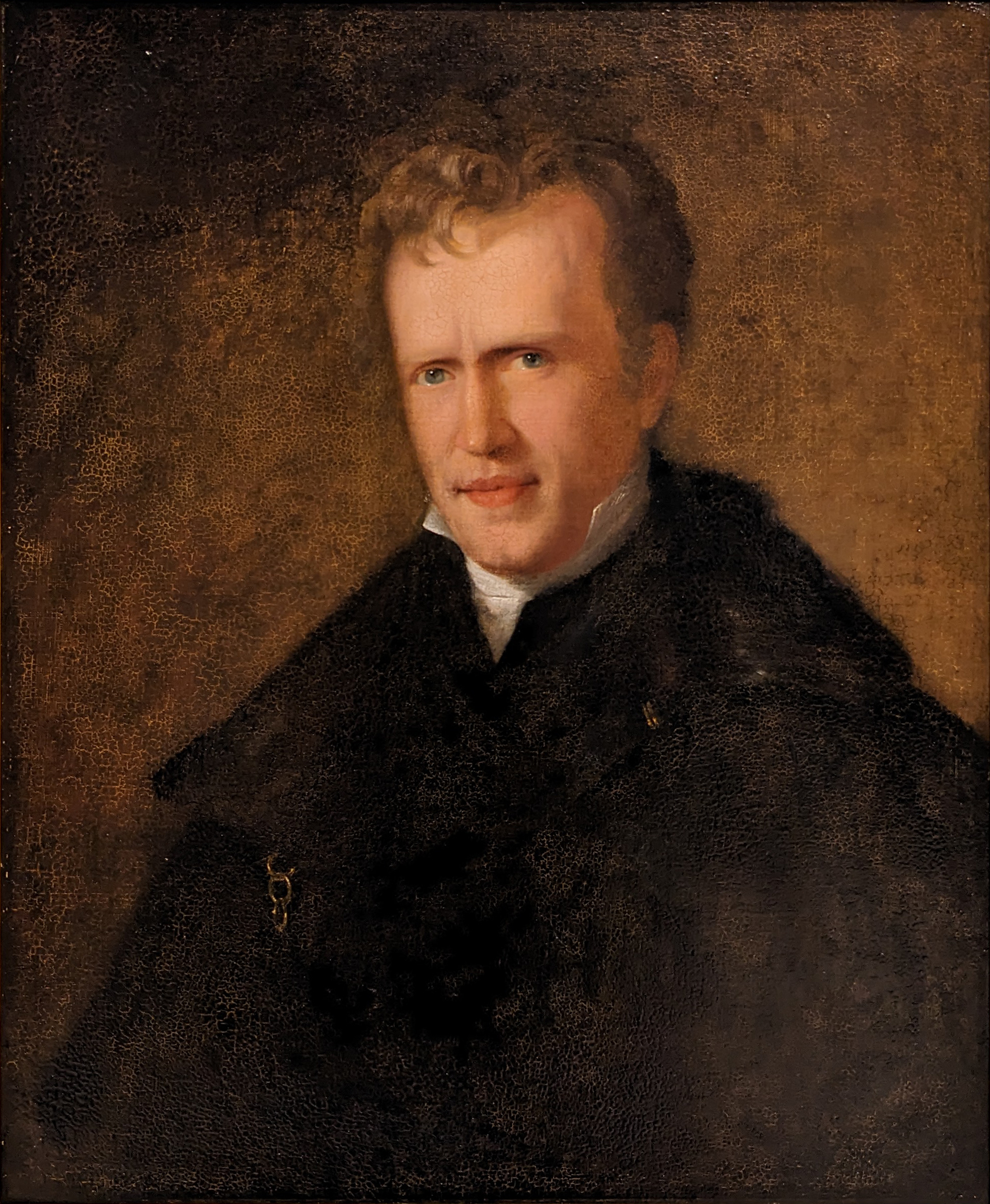
Writer, critic, editor, lecturer, and activist John Neal

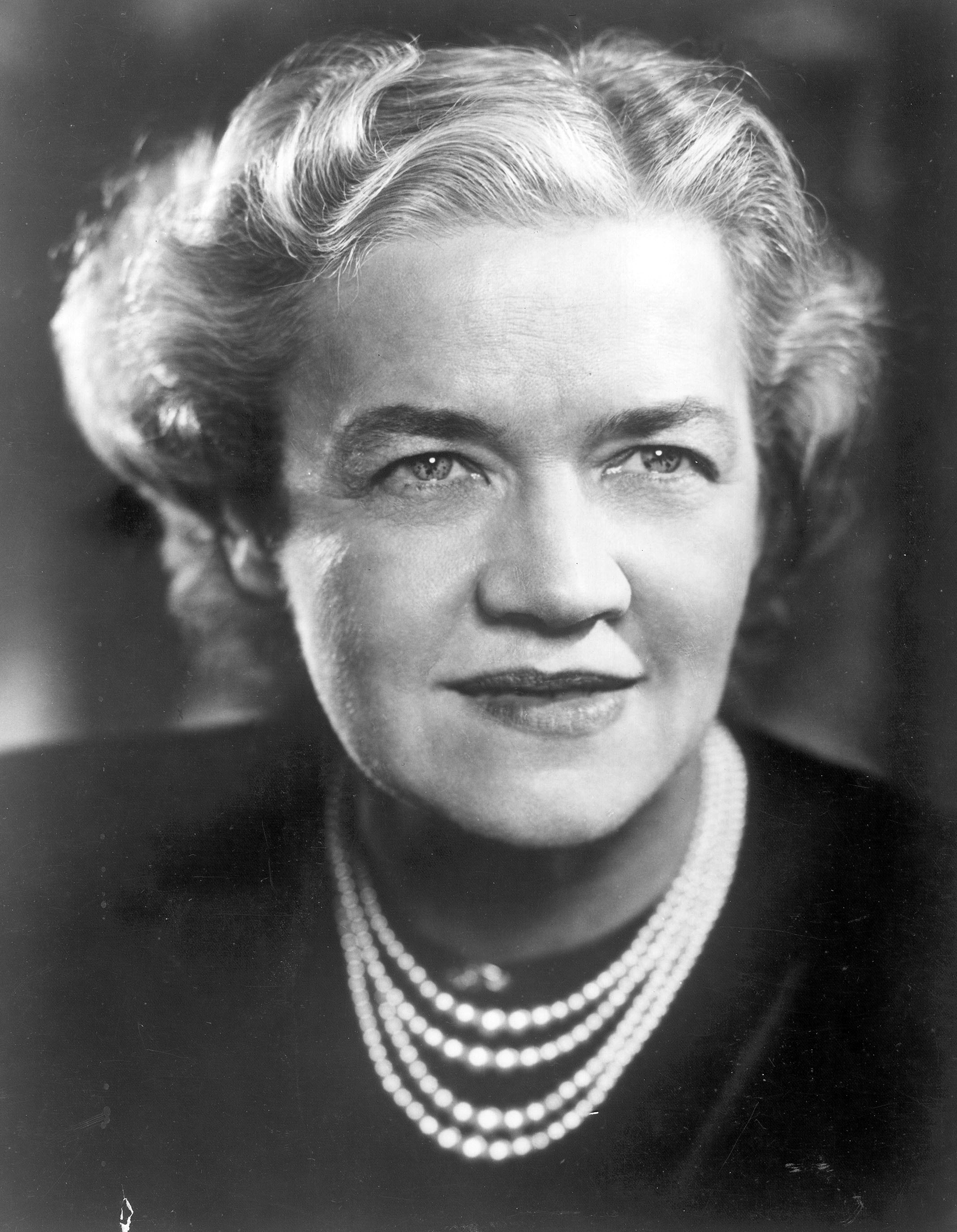
US Senator Margaret Chase Smith

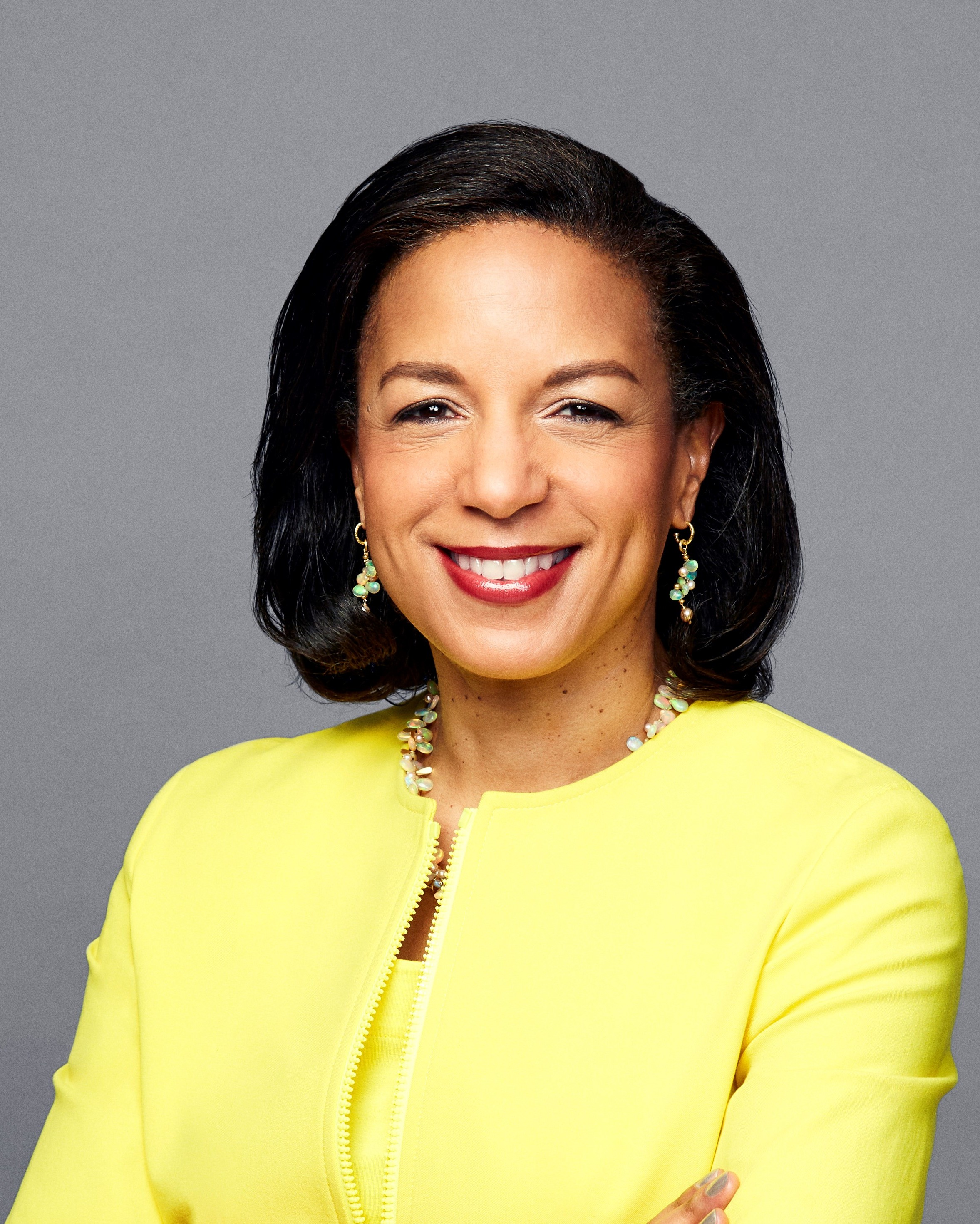
U.S. Domestic Policy Council Director Susan Rice

- John Neal M.A. 1836, poet, novelist, journalist, critic, editor, lecturer, athlete, and activist
- Jefferson Davis L.L.D. 1859, senator from Mississippi (1847–53, 1857–61), secretary of war under President Franklin Pierce (1853–1857), and president of the Confederate States of America (1861–65)
- Joshua Young, D.D., 1890, abolitionist, minister of several congregations in Vermont and Massachusetts
- Ashley Day Leavitt D.D. 1918, pastor, State Street Congregational Church, Portland, Maine
- Robert Frost Litt.D. 1926, Pulitzer Prize-winning poet and professor at Amherst College (1916–38)
- Leverett Saltonstall L.L.D. 1940, governor and United States Senator from Massachusetts
- Sturgis Elleno Leavitt Litt.D. 1943, scholar of Spanish language and literature, University of North Carolina at Chapel Hill
- Harlan Fiske Stone L.L.D. 1944, attorney general under President Calvin Coolidge (1924–25); Associate (1925–41) and chief justice of the Supreme Court (1941–46)
- N.C. Wyeth A.M. 1945, artist and illustrator
- Margaret Chase Smith L.L.D. 1952, representative (1940–49) and senator (1949–73) from Maine
- Sir Roger Makins LL.D. 1955, British ambassador to the United States
- Edmund Muskie L.L.D. 1957, Maine governor (1954–58); senator from Maine (1958–1980); Secretary of State under President Jimmy Carter (1980–81)
- David Rockefeller L.L.D. 1958, banker and philanthropist
- Doris Pike White L.H.D. 1960, investment banker, 24th president general of the Daughters of the American Revolution
- Roswell Gilpatric L.L.D. 1963, attorney, United States deputy secretary of defense
- Edward Brooke LL.D. 1969, senator from Massachusetts (1967–79)
- Andrew Wyeth D.F.A. 1970, artist
- E. Frederic Morrow L.L.D. 1970, first black US presidential aide; former Bowdoin undergraduate (1926–30)
- Olympia Snowe L.L.D. 1983, representative (1979–94) and senator (1994–present) from Maine
- Berenice Abbott D.F.A. 1982, photographer
- George H. W. Bush L.L.D. 1982, 43rd vice president (1981–89) and 41st president of the United States (1989–1993)
- Maya Angelou, Litt.D. 1987, Pulitzer Prize-winning poet and author
- Ken Burns L.H.D. 1991, director of documentaries on the American Civil War (1990), baseball (1994) and jazz (2001)
- Cornel West L.H.D. 1999, celebrity professor at Yale, Harvard and Princeton
- Paul Simon L.L.D. 2001, congressman (1975–85) and senator (1985–97) from Illinois
- Grace Paley Litt. D. 2003, essayist and short story writer
- Shulamit Ran Mus.D. 2004, Pulitzer Prize-winning composer
- Torsten N. Wiesel S.D. 2004, Nobel Prize winner in medicine
- Frederick Wiseman D.F.A. 2005, documentary filmmaker
- Roger Angell L.H.D. 2006, senior editor of The New Yorker
- Drew Gilpin Faust L.H.D. 2007, president of Harvard University
- Yvon Chouinard L.H.D. 2008, businessman, climber, founder of Patagonia Inc.
- Gina Kolata Litt.D. 2008, science journalist for The New York Times
- Kenneth Roth L.L.D. 2009, executive director of Human Rights Watch
- Edward Albee L.H.D. 2009, Pulitzer Prize-winning playwright
- John E. Baldacci L.L.D. 2011, governor of Maine (2003–11)
- Mira Nair D.F.A 2011, Academy Award-nominated Indian filmmaker
- Madeleine Albright L.L.D 2013, first female United States secretary of state
- Patrick Dempsey L.H.D. 2013, actor and philanthropist
- Susan Rice L.L.D. 2018, U.S. ambassador to the United Nations (2009–13), U.S. National Security advisor (2013–17), and U.S. Domestic Policy Council director (2021–2023)

== Notable faculty members and trustees (non-graduates) ==
- John Chandler (1762–1841), congressman and senator from Maine, trustee
- William King (1768–1862), Maine governor, trustee
- Jesse Appleton (1772–1819), president of Bowdoin and father of first lady Jane Pierce
- Parker Cleaveland (1780–1858), professor (50 years plus), scientist, "father of American mineralogy"
- Andrews Norton (1786–1853), theologian, visiting faculty member
- Amos Nourse (1794–1877), senator from Maine, professor of obstetrics
- James Bradbury (1802–1901), senator from Maine, trustee
- Roswell Dwight Hitchcock (1817–1887), professor of natural and revealed religion
- Charles Abiathar White (1826–1910), professor of natural history
- George Trumbull Ladd (1842–1921), professor of philosophy
- Alex Marzano-Lesnevich, professor of English
- Roy Ridley (1890–1969), writer and poet, visiting faculty member
- Adam Walsh (1901–1985), NFL Coach of the Year for the Cleveland Rams
- Rex Warner (1905–1986), English classicist, visiting faculty member
- Louis Coxe (1918–1993), poet and author, longtime professor of English
- Thomas Cornell (1937–2012), professor of art
- Elliott Schwartz (1936–2016), composer and Robert K. Beckwith Professor of Music Emeritus
- Brian Lukacher, art historian
- Angus King (1944–present), Maine governor, US Senator, adjunct faculty member
- Richard Ford (1944–present), Pulitzer Prize-winning novelist of Independence Day (1995)
- Paul Franco (1956–present), professor of political philosophy
- Michael Crow (1956–present), president of Arizona State University, trustee
- Anthony Walton (1960–present), poet and writer-in-residence
- Scott Sehon (1963–present), professor of philosophy
- John Bisbee (1965–present), sculptor and professor of art
- Kristen R. Ghodsee, ethnographer, professor of gender and women's studies
- Eddie Glaude, professor of religion
- Charles Beitz, professor of politics, former dean of Academic Affairs
- Richard E. Morgan, professor of politics, conservative writer
- Susan Faludi, Pulitzer Prize-winning feminist scholar, professor of gender and women's studies
- Bob Griffin (born 1980), American-Israeli basketball player, and English Literature professor
- Matthew Stuart (1966 or 1967 (age 59–60)–present), professor of philosophy

== See also ==
- List of Bates College people
- List of Colby College people
- List of Dartmouth College people
