= Prucnal =

Prucnal is a surname. Notable people with the surname include:

- Anna Prucnal (born 1940), Polish actress
- Paul Prucnal (born 1953), American electrical engineer
