= Dexter High School =

Dexter High School may refer to:

- Dexter High School (Michigan), Dexter, Michigan
- Dexter Regional High School, Dexter, Maine
