= Peg Higgins =

American politician (born c.1949)

Member of the New Hampshire House of Representatives from the Strafford 22nd district
- In office December 5, 2018 – December 1, 2020
- Preceded by: Thomas Kaczynski Jr.
- Succeeded by: Thomas Kaczynski Jr.

Personal details
- Born: c. 1949 (age 76–77)
- Party: Democratic
- Education: University of New Hampshire

Peg Higgins (born c. 1949) is a former member of the New Hampshire House of Representatives politician.

== Early life ==
Higgins was born around 1949. Higgins earned a master's in education from the University of New Hampshire.

== Career ==
Higgins used to work as a teacher in the Rochester School District. On November 6, 2018, Higgins was elected to the New Hampshire House of Representatives where she represents the Strafford 22 district. She assumed office on December 5, 2018. She is a Democrat. On November 3, 2020, Higgins was defeated in her bid for re-election by her predecessor, Thomas Kaczynski Jr., and left office on December 1, 2020.

== Personal life ==
Higgins resides in Rochester, New Hampshire. Higgins is married and has two children.
