= Pinnacle (TV program) =

Pinnacle is an American weekend news program that aired weekly on CNN from February 1983 until 2003.

== History ==
Pinnacle was created in 1983 by CNN Business News, which at the time was headed by Lou Dobbs. The first episode aired on a Saturday in February 1983. That first episode featured the then Chairman of Prudential Insurance.

CNN Business News producer Anthony Ciavatta was the founding producer of Pinnacle, with Tom.Cassidy serving as the original program host. In the first year, 47 original episodes of Pinnacle aired, all produced by Ciavatta and hosted by Cassidy. Eventually, producer Anthony Ciavatta would produce 70 episodes of Pinnacle with Cassidy. After the first year of production, CNN producer David Sager joined the program, eventually taking over after the departure of Ciavatta.

Pinnacle became one of CNN's most successful and prominent interview news programs.

Tom Cassidy hosted all episodes of the program until falling ill after being diagnosed with AIDS in 1987. Eventually, he had to step down and subsequently died in 1991 at age 41. He was replaced by Beverly Schuch. The series won a News & Documentary Emmy Award in 1992 when the Program turned the Camera around and focused on the life and career of Tom Cassidy as he was dying of Aids. The Emmy Award was accepted and shared by Executive Producer David Sager and his team, for Schuch's Pinnacle: Special Edition tribute to Tom Cassidy.

== Episodes ==
- Tony Conza, CEO, Blimpie.
- Richard Meier, architect (circa 1993)
- Peter Georgescu (1996)
