= William Fessenden =

William Fessenden may refer to:

- William P. Fessenden (1806–1869), American politician in Maine
- William Fessenden (New Hampshire politician), American politician in New Hampshire
