= Jere Abbott =

American art historian

- Born: October 5, 1897; Dexter, Maine, United States
- Died: July 9, 1982 (aged 84); Dexter, Maine, United States
- Occupations: Art historian Museum director

Academic background
- Education: Bowdoin College; Princeton University

Jere Abbott (October 5, 1897– July 9, 1982) was an American art historian and museum director. Abbott was the founding associate director of the Museum of Modern Art in New York City from 1929 to 1932, and director of the Smith College Museum of Art from 1932 to 1946.

== Career ==
Born in Dexter to Arthur Preston Abbott and Flora Shaw Parkman, Abbott graduated from Dexter Regional High School. He then received his Bachelor of Science from Bowdoin College, and went on to Harvard University with the intention of studying physics. There, Abbott met the art historian Alfred H. Barr Jr., who sparked an interest in the field. Abbott then pursued studies in France and Russia, and upon returning to his native country, transferred to Princeton University to receive a degree in Art History.

In 1929, Abbott helped to establish the Department of Fine Arts at Wesleyan University, and began working at the founding associate director of the Museum of Modern Art under its director, Barr. Abbott would hold the latter post until 1932. In that year, he was named director of the Smith College Museum of Art, where he also taught courses in modern art. Abbott became instrumental in shifting the museum focus toward the collecting of modern works such as Table, Guitar, and Bottle by Pablo Picasso (1919).

In 1946, Abbott retired from Smith to return to the family business as treasurer of Amos Abbott Woolen Manufacturing Company, based in his hometown of Dexter. For a span of thirty-five years, he would also serve as a trustee of the local Abbott Memorial Library.

In 1970, Abbott was awarded an honorary Doctor of Fine Arts degree from Colby College. Upon his death in 1982, he left the college a $4.3-million acquisition fund to the Colby College Museum of Art. In 2002, those funds helped the school purchase the Seven Walls sculpture made by Sol LeWitt. The personal papers of Abbott are now held in the archives of both Bowdoin and Smith College, respectively.

== See also ==
- List of Bowdoin College people
