= Colby College Museum of Art =

Coordinates: 44°33′54″N 69°39′39″W

- Established: 1959
- Location: 5600 Mayflower Hill; Waterville, Maine, United States
- Type: Art museum
- Website: www.colby.edu/museum

The Colby College Museum of Art is an art museum on the campus of Colby College in Waterville, Maine. Founded in 1959 and now comprising five wings, nearly 8,000 works and more than 38,000 square feet of exhibition space, the Colby College Museum of Art has built a collection that specializes in American and contemporary art with additional, select collections of Chinese antiquities and European paintings and works on paper. The museum serves as a teaching resource for Colby College and is a major cultural destination for the residents of Maine and visitors to the state.

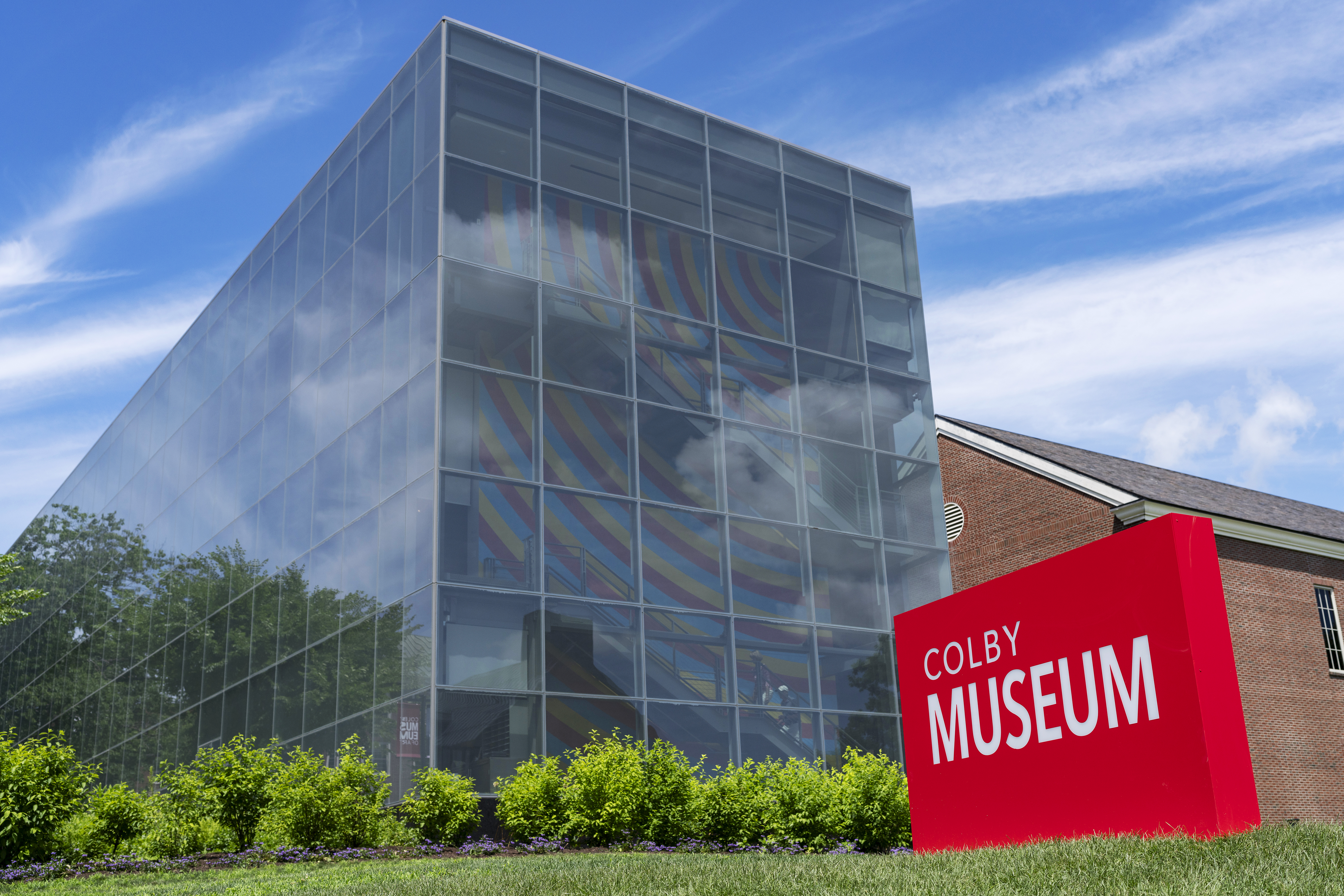
Colby College Museum of Art, 2024

== History ==
In the early 1950s, Adeline and Caroline Wing gave paintings by William Merritt Chase, Winslow Homer, and Andrew Wyeth to Colby College. In 1956, Mr. and Mrs. Ellerton M. Jetté donated their American Heritage Collection, consisting of 76 works by American folk artists. The next year, the college received the Helen Warren and Willard Howe Cummings collection of American paintings and watercolors. Two years later, in 1959, the museum opened its first official galleries in the Bixler Art and Music Center. The Jetté Galleries, a major addition designed by E. Verner Johnson and Associates, opened in 1973. In that same year, Norma B. Marin and John Marin Jr. gave 25 works of art by John Marin. In 1984, the museum celebrated its 25th anniversary with the exhibition, Portrait of New England Places, which covered a span of nearly 200 years in American art.

In 1991, the museum expanded again, increasing the collection storage facilities and adding the Davis Gallery, designed by the Shepley, Bulfinch, Richardson and Abbott. In 1996, the museum inaugurated the Paul J. Schupf Wing for the Works of Alex Katz to house this collection. In 1999, with a lead gift from Peter and Paula Lunder, a new wing opened for the exhibition of Colby's growing collection of American art. The Lunder Wing, designed by architect Frederick Fisher, comprises 13 galleries and 9,000 square feet of exhibition space for the Colby Museum's growing collection.

In 2000, Richard Serra's monumental 4-5-6 was installed in the Paul J. Schupf Sculpture Court. This three-part Corten steel sculpture dramatically anchors the courtyard and main entrance to the museum. In 2002, on the museum's east lawn, Seven Walls, a concrete structure by conceptual artist Sol LeWitt, was installed with support for its construction provided by the Jere Abbott Acquisitions Fund. In 2006, Paul J. Schupf promised the museum his collection of more than 150 works on paper and one sculpture by Richard Serra. This gift makes the Colby Museum one of the largest repositories of Serra's works on paper.

In 2007, Peter and Paula Lunder, longtime benefactors of the museum, promised their outstanding collection to Colby College. The gift included more than 500 works of art, the majority of them by American artists, as well as the forty exceptional examples of ritual and mortuary art that comprise the Lunder-Colville Chinese Art Collection. In 2009, the college approved the designs for the Alfond-Lunder Family Pavilion, named in recognition of a gift from the Harold Alfond Foundation and the partnership and friendship between Harold Alfond and Peter Lunder. This same year, the museum marked its fiftieth anniversary by presenting the exhibition Art at Colby: Celebrating the Fiftieth Anniversary of the Colby College Museum of Art.

In July 2013, the Colby Museum inaugurated the Alfond-Lunder Family Pavilion. Refined and minimalist in design, the glass pavilion completes a circuit with the four existing wings of the museum. The LEED Silver certified pavilion provides a spacious lobby that includes a sculpture gallery and terrace, as well as new exhibition galleries, classrooms, expanded collection storage, and staff offices. A three-story wall drawing by conceptual artist Sol LeWitt occupies the glass-enclosed stairwell. The pavilion's upper floor is dedicated to the college's art department, providing new studios for photography and fine art foundation classes. Approximately 2,500 images of works in the permanent collection are available on ARTstor.

== Collections ==
=== The Alex Katz Collection ===
In 1992, the museum received a gift of 414 works by Alex Katz from the artist. The collection now holds over 800 works by the artist. Archive material related to the Katz Collection is held by Colby's Special Collections and is available to students and researchers.

=== The John Marin Collection ===
The John Marin Collection at the Colby College Museum of Art displays a retrospective collection of paintings, watercolors, drawings, etchings, and photographs. Twenty-four works spanning the artist's career from 1888 to 1953 were given to the museum in 1973 by John Marin Jr. and Norma B. Marin. An additional work was given in 1992, and in 1998 Norma Marin made a promised gift of 29 etchings by Marin and seven vintage photographs of Marin, including a platinum print by Alfred Stieglitz. The collection ranks second to the National Gallery of Art’s collection in both media variety and size.

=== The Terry Winters Collection ===
The Colby College Museum of Art is the sole repository of Terry Winters's entire archive of prints. Numbering more than 200 works, the Winters Print Collection came to the museum in 2002 as a partial gift from the artist and ULAE, with the remaining support drawn from the museum's Jere Abbott Acquisitions Fund.

=== The Whistler Collection ===
More than 300 etchings and lithographs make up the Whistler Collection, representing some of the rarest and most beautiful impressions by James Abbott McNeill Whistler. The collection also contains examples of artist's work in other media, and a collection of more than 150 books, journals, photographs, and archival materials related to Whistler. Research material is available by appointment to students and researchers.

=== Skowhegan Lecture Archive ===
With lectures from artists including Yvonne Jacquette, Alex Katz, Jacob Lawrence, and others, The Skowhegan School of Art lecture archive represents the depth and breadth of post-war American art. These recorded lectures have been compiled as an audio collection consisting of more than 500 talks on more than 700 compact discs. The lectures were originally intended for art students and fellow artists, and Colby was one of five American Art Institutions to receive copies of the lecture archive along with The Archives of American Art, The Art Institute of Chicago, The Getty Research Institute, and The Museum of Modern Art.

== Collaborations ==
The Lunder Consortium for Whistler Studies produces original scholarship and critical analysis of James Abbott McNeill Whistler and his international artistic circles. The Colby College Museum of Art joins The Smithsonian Institution's Freer Gallery of Art and Arthur M. Sackler Gallery, and the University of Glasgow in the consortium. The museum also collaborates with the nearby Bowdoin College Museum of Art.
