= Thomas L. Kaczynski Jr. =

American politician

Tom Kaczynski

Member of the New Hampshire House of Representatives from the Strafford 22nd district
- Incumbent
- Assumed office December 2, 2020
- Preceded by: Peg Higgins
- Succeeded by: William Fessenden (elect)
- In office December 3, 2014 – December 5, 2018
- Preceded by: Rose Marie Rogers
- Succeeded by: Peg Higgins

Personal details
- Born: c. 1955 (age 70–71)
- Party: Republican

Thomas L. Kaczynski Jr. (born c. 1955) is a New Hampshire politician.

== Early life ==
Kaczynski was born around 1955. Kaczynski is a graduate of East Haven High School.

== Career ==
Kaczynski is a live poultry dealer. On November 4, 2014, Kaczynski was elected to the New Hampshire House of Representatives where he represented the Strafford 22 district from December 3, 2014 to December 5, 2018. On November 6, 2018, Kaczynski sought re-election, but was defeated by Democrat Peg Higgins. On November 3, 2020, Kaczynski was again elected to the New Hampshire House of Representatives seat which represents the Strafford 22 district, defeating Higgins in her attempt at re-election. He assumed office again on December 2, 2020. He is a Republican.

== Personal life ==
Kaczynski resides in Rochester, New Hampshire. Kaczynski is married and has a child.
