= Schuch =

Schuch (German pronunciation: [ʃuːx]) is a German surname.

In some orthographies it is spelled Szuch. It may refer to:

- Albrecht Schuch, German actor
- Carl Eduard Schuch, Austrian painter
- Johann Christian Schuch, designer and architect
- Karoline Schuch, German actress
- Timuzsin Schuch, Hungarian handball player
- Ernst Edler von Schuch, Austrian conductor

== See also ==
- Clara Bohm-Schuch, German politician
- Lisa Schuch-Gubik, Austrian politician
