= Dexter Regional High School =

Location
- 12 Abbott Hill Road; Dexter, ME; Dexter, Maine 04930; United States
- Coordinates: 45°01′33″N 69°17′49″W

Information
- School type: public
- Founded: 1968
- School district: AOS#94
- Superintendent: Kevin Jordan
- Principal: Stephen Bell
- Teaching staff: 20.70 (FTE)
- Grades: 9–12
- Student to teacher ratio: 13.04
- Classes offered: Regular, Honors, AP
- Colors: Red and white
- Mascot: Tiger
- Accreditation: New England Association of Schools and Colleges
- Website: www.aos94.org/schools/drhs/

Dexter Regional High School is a public high school in Dexter, Maine, United States. During the 2012–13 school year, DRHS had approx. 300 enrolled students. In 2002, the school had a graduation rate of 81.52%, below the state's rate of 86.71%. In 2003, the graduation rate was 76.84%, below the state average of 87.57%.

== Notable alumni ==
- Jere Abbott, founding associate director of the Museum of Modern Art
