= Tom Cassidy (journalist) =

American journalist

- Born: Thomas J. Cassidy; August 12, 1949
- Died: May 26, 1991 (aged 41)
- Education: Bowdoin College; Columbia University
- Occupations: Financial News anchor, journalist
- Known for: LGBT and HIV/AIDS activism

Tom Cassidy (August 12, 1949 – May 26, 1991) was the television business anchor for Cable News Network (CNN), an American cable news television station, and the founder of the weekend show Pinnacle in 1982. Significantly, he was the CNN business news anchor during Black Monday, 19 October 1987. This was a famous day on Wall Street when the Dow Jones Industrial Average (DJIA) fell 508 points to 1739, a frightening drop during which time Cassidy's ongoing reporting during the afternoon and evening provided both credible information and a significant calmness to the American public.

== Early life and education ==
Cassidy was born in Boston on 12 August 1949. He majored in history at Bowdoin College in Maine. He went to Columbia University in New York City, where he received master's degrees in economics and journalism.

== Career ==
In 1978 he began his career in broadcasting for KEZI-TV in Eugene, Oregon, as a reporter and anchor. Cassidy then moved over to KGO-TV in San Francisco. After that Cassidy was the business editor for Mutual Radio in Chicago. He began at CNN in 1981, one of CNN's first anchors and reporters. In 1982 he founded CNN's weekend show about business leaders, Pinnacle. In 1984 he became the host of Pinnacle, a position he held until 1988.

== HIV-AIDS ==
In 1987 he was diagnosed as HIV positive the same day as Black Monday, 19 October. Cassidy went public on New York area television on an ongoing basis with his dilemma, treatment and progress (including revealing his diagnosis to his family on camera) in order to better educate the public about HIV/AIDS disease.

== Bowdoin College endowment ==
As Cassidy was a 1972 graduate of Bowdoin College, his will endowed Bowdoin with a lectureship in which prominent working journalists give lectures on a wide variety of topics each year. Thomas J. Cassidy lecturers at Bowdoin have included: Lou Dobbs of CNN; Linda Wertheimer of National Public Radio; Andrew Serwer of Fortune Magazine; and Amanda Griscom Little, environmental writer for The New York Times and The Washington Post. Cassidy completed two master's degrees in finance and journalism from Columbia University.

== Podcast ==
Season 2, episode 11 of the podcast “Making Gay History” is about him.

== Death ==
Cassidy died on 26 May 1991 in Mount Sinai Hospital in New York City from complications of HIV/AIDS.
