= Paul Franco =

Paul N. Franco (born 1956) is an American professor of government at Bowdoin College in Brunswick, Maine, and a leading authority on the British political philosopher Michael Oakeshott.

== Biography ==
Franco holds a B.A. from Colorado College, where he studied under Oakeshott scholar Timothy Fuller, an M.Sc. from the London School of Economics, where he studied under Oakeshott himself, and a Ph.D. from the University of Chicago, where his advisor was Joseph Cropsey, a friend and disciple of the political philosopher Leo Strauss. Before Bowdoin, he taught at the University of Chicago as a William Rainey Harper Fellow.

Fuller called his book, The Political Philosophy of Michael Oakeshott (1990) the "only complete and current exposition" of Oakeshott so far. In The Conservative Soul, Fundamentalism, Freedom, and the Future of the Right (2006) blogger Andrew Sullivan referred to Franco as one of Oakeshott's "most insightful students." Franco's attempt to restore Hegel's place as an enlightenment philosopher Hegel's Philosophy of Freedom (2002) addresses a growing emphasis on Hegel's romanticism and historicism. Franco's Hegel book is now generally read alongside the work of other eminent Hegel scholars such as Robert Pippin, Charles Taylor, Steven Smith, and Alexandre Kojève. Franco's current work focuses on Friedrich Nietzsche's middle works.

Franco's articles and reviews have appeared in The American Political Science Review, Political Theory, The Journal of Politics, The Review of Politics, Political Studies, Ethics, and The Political Science Reviewer.

== Political philosophy ==
Societas and universitas: These two poles anchor Franco's thought. The former, as expressed by Oakeshott, refers to a "band of eccentrics" bound together by no common purposes. Universitas refers to a political order conceived as a people consecrated to a collective enterprise. Franco's work on Oakeshott leans towards the Societas understanding of politics whereas his recent works on Nietzsche lean towards a universitas conception of politics. He does not seem to think these two are mutually exclusive. One could say his project is trying to reconcile universitas and liberalism for the 21st century.

== Books ==
- The Political Philosophy of Michael Oakeshott (Yale, 1990)
- Hegel's Philosophy of Freedom (Yale, 1999)
- Michael Oakeshott: An Introduction (Yale, 2004)
- Adventures of a Free Spirit: Nietzsche's Trilogy from the Middle Period (Chicago, 2011)
- Rousseau, Nietzsche, and the Image of the Human (Chicago, 2021)
