= William De Witt Hyde =

American educator and academic administrator

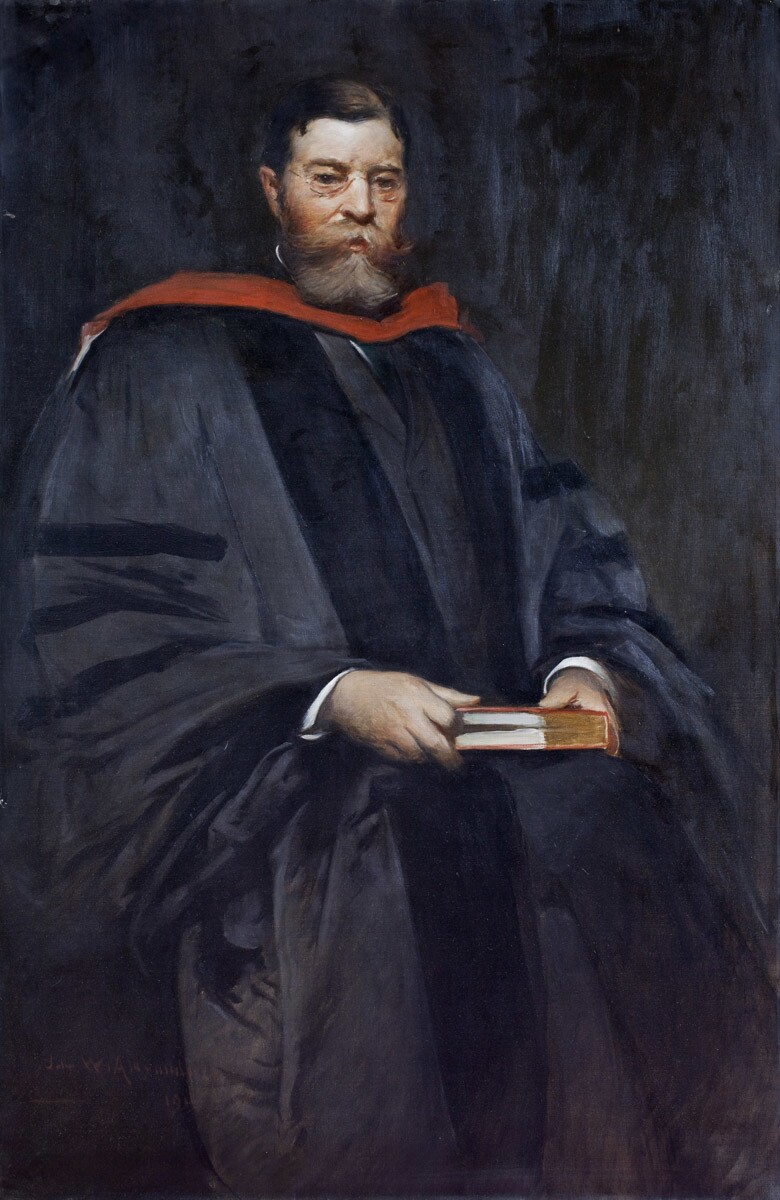
- Hyde in 1915

7th President of Bowdoin College
- In office 1885–1917
- Preceded by: Joshua Chamberlain
- Succeeded by: Kenneth C.M. Sills

Personal details
- Born: September 23, 1858 Winchendon, Massachusetts
- Died: June 29, 1917 (aged 58) Brunswick, Maine
- Education: Phillips Exeter Academy; Harvard University

William De Witt Hyde (September 23, 1858 – June 29, 1917) was an American educator and academic administrator who served as the president of Bowdoin College in Brunswick, Maine, for thirty-two years, from 1885 to his death in 1917.

== Biography ==
Born in Winchendon, Massachusetts, Hyde graduated from Phillips Exeter Academy in 1874, from Harvard University in 1879, and from Andover Theological Seminary in 1882. Ordained to the Congregational ministry in 1883, he was a pastor in Paterson, New Jersey, from then until 1885. Thereafter, he became president of Bowdoin College, also holding the position of chair of mental and moral philosophy at the College.

In 1906, he penned the poem "The Offer of the College," which was given to every student at Bowdoin until 1969. It was subsequently edited to reflect the changing demographics of the student body.

== Publications ==
- Practical Ethics (1892)
- Social Theology (1895)
- Practical idealism (1897)
- God's Education of Man (1899)
- The Art of Optimism (1900)
- The Cardinal Virtues (1901)
- Jesus' Way (1902)
- The New Ethics (1903)
- From Epicurus to Christ (1904)
- The College Man and the College Woman (1906)
- Abba, Father (1908)
- Self-Measurement (1908)
- Sin and its Forgiveness (1909)
- The Teacher's Philosophy in and out of School (1910)
- The Five Great Philosophies of Life (1911)
- The Quest of the Best (1913)

Preceded by Joshua Chamberlain	President of Bowdoin College; 1885–1917	Succeeded by Kenneth C.M. Sills
