= William Fessenden (New Hampshire politician) =

American politician

Member-elect of the New Hampshire House of Representatives from the Strafford 5th district
- Assuming office December 2026
- Succeeding: Thomas L. Kaczynski Jr.

Personal details
- Party: Democratic

William Fassenden is an American politician. A member of the Democratic Party, he is the member-elect for the Strafford 5th district of the New Hampshire House of Representatives.
