= Lisa Schuch-Gubik =

Austrian politician (born 1994)

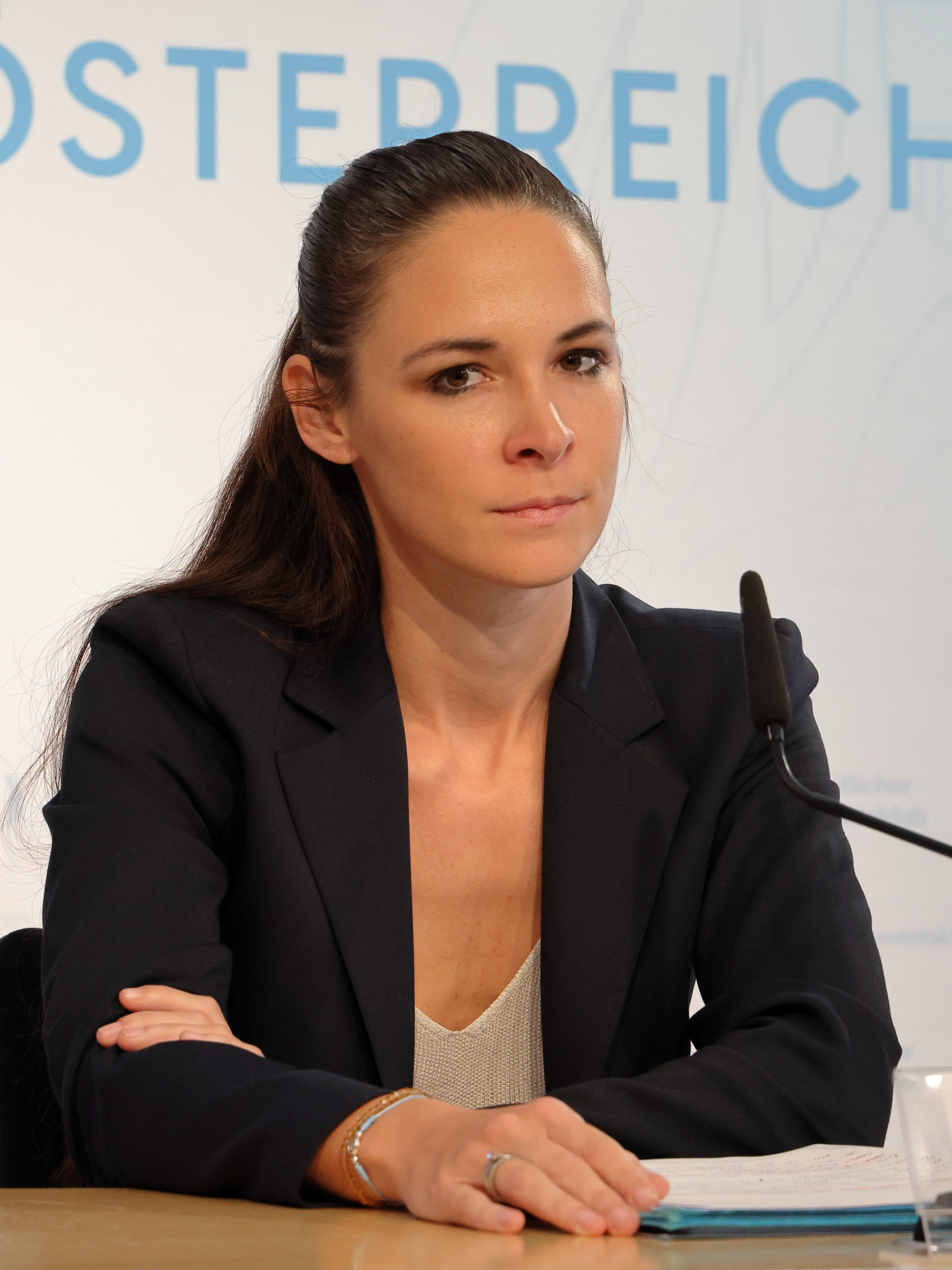
- Lisa Schuch-Gubik in 2026

Member of the National Council
- Incumbent
- Assumed office 24 October 2024
- Constituency: Thermenregion

Personal details
- Born: Lisa Gubik; 1 April 1994 (age 32)
- Party: Freedom Party

Lisa Schuch-Gubik (née Gubik; born 1 April 1994) is an Austrian politician of the Freedom Party. She was elected member of the National Council in the 2024 legislative election, and has served as a municipal councillor of Ebreichsdorf since 2015.
