= James S. Coles =

American academic administrator

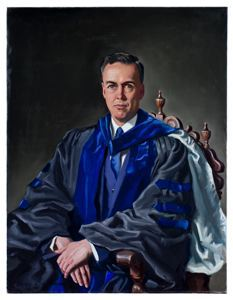

9th President of Bowdoin College
- In office 1952–1968
- Preceded by: Kenneth C.M. Sills
- Succeeded by: Roger Howell Jr.

Personal details
- Born: June 3, 1913 Mansfield, Pennsylvania
- Died: July 13, 1996 (aged 83) Falmouth, Massachusetts
- Education: Columbia University

James Stacy Coles (June 3, 1913 – June 13, 1996) was the ninth president of Bowdoin College.

== Life and career ==
After having graduated from Columbia University in 1936, Coles earned a PhD in chemistry at Columbia and taught at several educational institutions including Middlebury College and Brown University before becoming president of Bowdoin. Additionally, for his work in anti-submarine warfare during World War II done at the Underwater Explosives Research Laboratory at Woods Hole, he was awarded the President’s Certificate of Merit.

Coles became president of Bowdoin in 1952 and served until 1968. Coles was the first president to build dormitories for seniors and saw the sizes of his student body, faculty, and campus grow dramatically. Notably, the Coles Tower, one of the tallest buildings in Maine, was built during his tenure. Originally known as the Senior Center, the 16-story building was an educational experiment that brought virtually the entire senior class into a single residence hall and made a senior seminar part of each semester's course offerings.

After he left Bowdoin, Coles became president of Research Corporation, a private foundation for the advancement of science and technology. During his occupancy, the foundation’s assets increased from $11 million to $46 million.

Preceded by Kenneth C.M. Sills	President of Bowdoin College; 1952–68	Succeeded by Roger Howell Jr.
