= Matthew Stuart (philosopher) =

American philosopher

- Born: 1966 or 1967 (age 59–60)
- Education: Cornell University; University of Vermont
- Known for: Analytical Historian of Philosophy
- Scientific career
- Fields: Philosophy; Modern Philosophy; Epistemology; Metaphysics; Ethics
- Workplaces: Bowdoin College

Matthew Stuart (born 1966/1967) is an American philosopher and a professor of philosophy at Bowdoin College. His primary work is in the field of Early Modern Philosophy, metaphysics, epistemology, and ethics and focuses on the philosophy of John Locke. He is the author of Locke’s Metaphysics (Oxford Clarendon Press, 2013) in which he takes a unique approach to John Locke's work "An Essay Concerning Human Understanding" to view it as a strong Metaphysical text, rather than just that of epistemology. Some ideas approached in his book focus on "Locke's denial that bodies can be co-located", that "empty spaces within a body are not parts of [them]", that "[Locke's] relativism about identity equips him to respond to objects to his account of personal identity", and that of Locke's "rejection of essentialism". Stuart's book received attention from reviewers as a strong source for Lockean scholars to consider; still, several crucial critiques were offered, including Stuart's interpretation of substance and mode, as well as Stuart's interpretation of Locke's account of identity.

Stuart has expressed sympathy to the unpopular Ontological view of Animalism (philosophy).

Stuart received his B.A. in philosophy from the University of Vermont and earned a Masters and Ph.D. in philosophy at Cornell University. He has been employed at Bowdoin College since 1993.

== Books ==
A Companion to Locke (Editor). Oxford: Wily-Blackwell Publishing Co., 2016.

Locke’s Metaphysics. Oxford: Clarendon Press, 2013.
