= Roger Howell Jr. =

10th President of Bowdoin College
- In office 1969–1978
- Preceded by: James S. Coles
- Succeeded by: Willard F. Enteman

Personal details
- Born: 1936 Baltimore, Maryland
- Died: September 27, 1989 (aged 53) Brunswick, Maine
- Education: Bowdoin College

Roger Howell Jr. (1936 – September 27, 1989) was the tenth president of Bowdoin College in Brunswick, Maine, and the fourth to be an alumnus of the college.

== Early life and career ==
Born in Baltimore, Maryland, Howell graduated summa cum laude with Highest Honors in History from Bowdoin College in 1958. Elected to Phi Beta Kappa in his junior year, he continued his education on a Rhodes Scholarship to St. John's College, Oxford, where he received a B.A., M.A., and D.Phil. One of the rare Americans to teach British history at Oxford, he was an instructor at Oxford's International Graduate School, as well as Johns Hopkins University, before returning to Bowdoin to teach history in 1964 and chairing its History Department in 1967.

== Bowdoin College presidency ==
When Howell became the college's tenth president in 1968 at age 32, he was one of the youngest university presidents in the nation. Under his nine-year presidency, Bowdoin became a co-ed institution (1971), expanded its enrollment from 950 students to 1,350, founded its computing center, established Maine's first African-American center, developed African-American studies and 12-college exchange programs, and invited students to participate on Governing Boards committees.

In 1970, Bowdoin became the first academic institution in America to eliminate SAT I and College Board Achievement Test requirements. This set a trend to follow for other institutions, including Bates College, Franklin & Marshall College, Hamilton College, Middlebury College, Mount Holyoke College, Pitzer College, the University of Texas at Austin, and Wheaton College, among others.

Howell was also instrumental in the founding of the Bowdoin College Men's Rugby team in the 1969-1970 academic year. After becoming a rugby fan during his time at Oxford University, he not only offered administrative support for the club, but also helped with the coaching duties.

Also under Howell's presidency, Bowdoin's Visual Arts Center was erected in 1975 to provide much-needed space for instruction in the college's expanding Art History and Studio Art departments. Designed by Edward Larrabee Barnes, the center was built according to Howell's stipulations: "Not only must a building placed in close proximity to the Walker Art Building be architecturally of superior construction, but it must also be flexible enough in interior design to meet changing needs and methods of instruction."

By the time Howell stepped down from the presidency in 1978 to resume full-time teaching, writing and research at Bowdoin, it had received reaccreditation from the New England Association of Colleges and Secondary Schools, which had "commended [it]...for offering a traditional educational excellently." Howell eventually earned the college's endowed chair of William R. Kenan Jr. Professor of the Humanities.

== Publications ==
During his life, Howell wrote several books on British history, specializing in Tudor and Stuart England. His publications include biographies of Oliver Cromwell and Sir Philip Sidney, Newcastle upon Tyne and the Puritan Revolution: A Study of the Civil War in North England (1967), and Images of Oliver Cromwell: Essays For and By Roger Howell, completed posthumously by editor R.C. Richardson and published in 1993. Howell was also founder and editor of the British Studies Monitor. His presidential inaugural address, "A New Humanism," was published in book form by Bowdoin College in 1969.

== Death ==
Howell died in 1989 from heart failure at the Maine Medical Center in Portland.

== Remembrance ==
On October 21, 2000, Bowdoin's former Alpha Delta Phi fraternity house was renamed Howell House in honor of Roger Howell Jr., who had been a member of that fraternity as an undergraduate.

In 2001, Bowdoin's Board of Trustees established the Roger Howell Jr. Professorship. "With the establishment of the Roger Howell Jr. Professorship, we honor a man who was an outstanding student, a beloved and respected teacher and one of the leading historians of his day," said Bowdoin College President Robert H. Edwards upon naming Allen Wells to the new professorship. "No one ever evinced a greater love for the liberal arts or for Bowdoin, which he led as president for nine years, than Roger Howell."

Preceded by James S. Coles	President of Bowdoin College; 1969–78	Succeeded by Willard F. Enteman
