= Kenneth C. M. Sills =

American college president (1879–1954)

Kenneth C.M. Sills
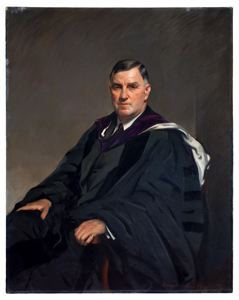

8th President of Bowdoin College
- In office 1918–1952
- Preceded by: William De Witt Hyde
- Succeeded by: James S. Coles

Personal details
- Born: December 5, 1879 Halifax, Nova Scotia
- Died: November 15, 1954 (aged 74) Portland, Oregon
- Education: Bowdoin College

Kenneth Charles Morton Sills (December 5, 1879 – November 15, 1954) was an American academic the eighth president of Bowdoin College and the third to be an alumnus.

== Life and career ==
Born in Halifax, Nova Scotia, Sills moved at the age of one with his parents, Charles Morton and Elizabeth Sills to Portland, Maine, United States. He graduated from Butler Elementary School and Portland High School before attending Bowdoin College. In 1901 Sills graduated summa cum laude from Bowdoin, where he was appointed to Phi Beta Kappa and Delta Kappa Epsilon. He pursued graduate degrees at Columbia University and Harvard University afterwards.

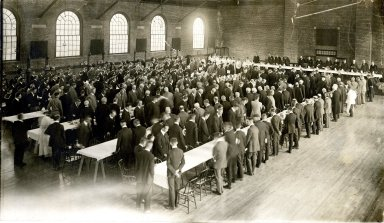
Inaugural luncheon for President Kenneth Sills in Sargent Gymnasium, Bowdoin College, Brunswick, Maine, 1918

After working at Columbia for a brief period of time, Sills returned to teach at Bowdoin in 1906, where he soon became dean. In 1916, he was the Democratic nominee for the United States Senate, losing to Bert M. Fernald. In 1918, Sills became president of Bowdoin. He was determined to keep the school close to its liberal arts curriculum and closed down the Medical School of Maine in 1920. In the early 1930s, Sills was recruited by President Franklin Delano Roosevelt to commission a study on how the Bay of Fundy tides could harness electrical power and, from 1939 to 1941, he served as chairman of the board for the Carnegie Foundation for the Advancement of Teaching. After World War II, he served on the board of trustees of the World Peace Foundation. Sills served an unusually long term as president, finally resigning in 1952, widely regarded as one of the most prominent and amiable college presidents in Bowdoin's over 200-year history. Nevertheless, a published poet, he is perhaps best known today for having written the school's Alma Mater, "Rise, Sons of Bowdoin" which continues to be sung today more than fifty years after it was originally written.

== Published works ==
- The First American and Other Poems
- "Maine" . Encyclopædia Britannica (12th ed.). 1922.

Party political offices
New title	Democratic nominee for U.S. Senator from Maine (Class 2); 1916	Succeeded by Elmer E. Newbert
Academic offices
Preceded by William DeWitt Hyde	President of Bowdoin College; 1918–52	Succeeded by James S. Coles
