= Paul Prucnal =

American electrical engineer

Paul R. Prucnal
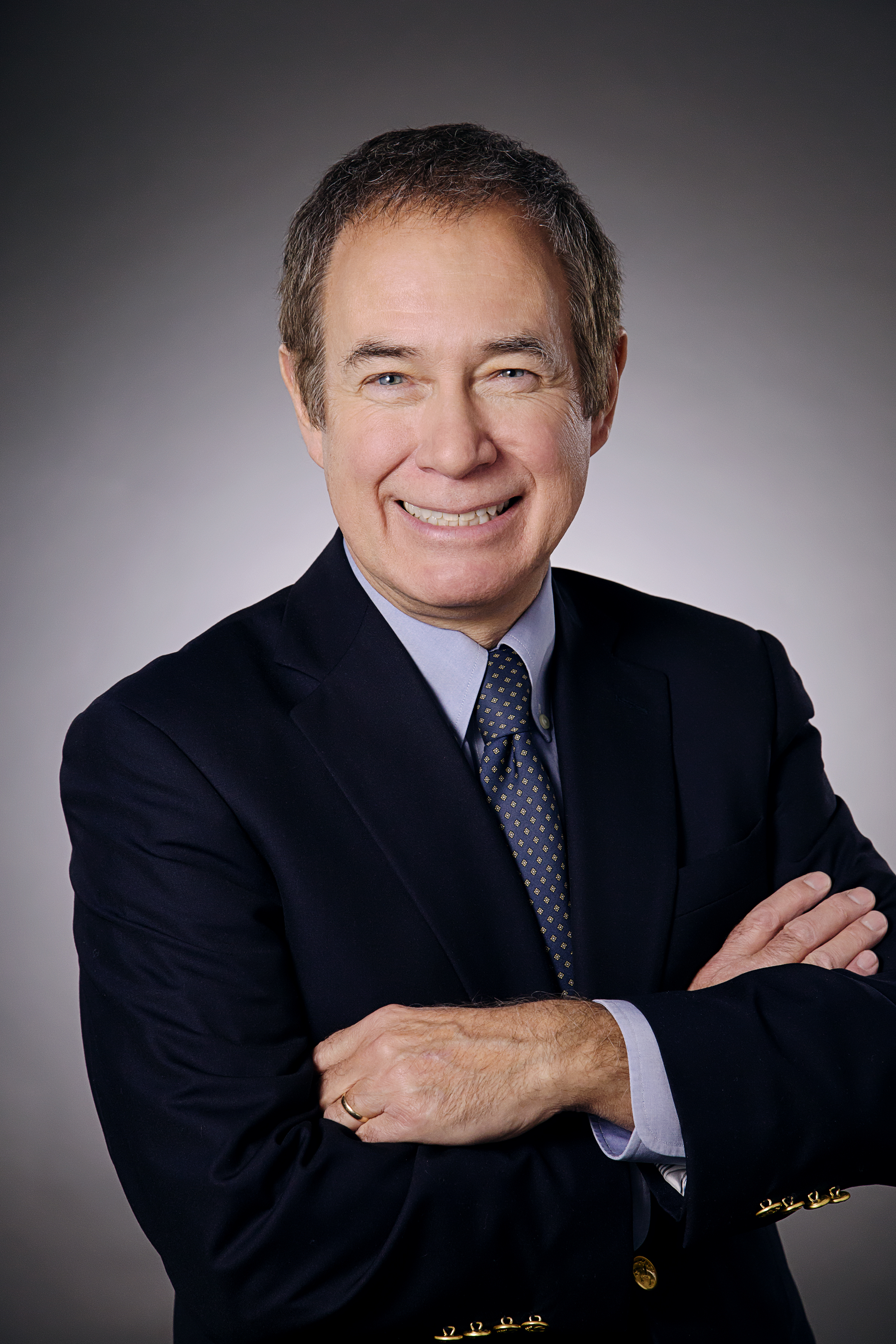
- Born: 1953 (age 72–73)
- Education: Bowdoin College (B.A.), summa cum laud Columbia University (Ph.D)
- Known for: Neuromorphic Photonics; Optical Code Division Multiple Access (OCDMA); Terahertz Optical Asymmetric Demultiplexer (TOAD)
- Awards: Rudolf Kingslake Medal and Prize SPIE; Fellow of the IEEE (1992); Fellow of the Optical Society of America (1997)
- Scientific career
- Fields: Photonics; Electrical Engineering
- Workplaces: Columbia University (1979-1988); Princeton University (1988-present)
- Website: http://ee.princeton.edu/research/prucnal/

Paul R. Prucnal (born 1953) is an American electrical engineer. He is a professor of electrical engineering at Princeton University. He is best known for his seminal work in Neuromorphic Photonics, optical code division multiple access (OCDMA) and the invention of the terahertz optical asymmetric demultiplexor (TOAD). He is currently a fellow of IEEE for contributions to photonic switching and fiber-optic networks, Optical Society of America and National Academy of Inventors.

== Life and career ==
Prucnal received his A.B. In mathematics and physics from Bowdoin College in 1974, graduating summa cum laud, where he also studied piano with William Eves, a pupil of Robert Casadesus. He then earned M.S., M.Phil. and Ph. D. degrees in electrical engineering from Columbia University in 1976, 1978 and 1979, respectively, where he did his doctoral work with Malvin Carl Teich. After his doctorate, Prucnal joined the faculty at Columbia University in 1979. As a member of the Columbia Radiation Laboratory, he performed groundbreaking work in OCDMA and self-routed photonic switching. In 1988, he joined the faculty at Princeton University.

His developmental research on optical CDMA initiated a new research field in which more than 1000 papers have since been published, exploring applications ranging from information security to communication speed and bandwidth. In 1993, he invented the "Terahertz Optical Asymmetric Demultiplexer," the first optical switch capable of processing terabit per second (Tb/s) pulse trains. With support from DARPA in the 1990s, his group was the first to demonstrate an all-optical 100 gigabit/sec photonic packet switching node and optical multiprocessor interconnect.

Prucnal is author of the book, Neuromorphic Photonics, and editor of the book, Optical Code Division Multiple Access: Fundamentals and Applications. He was an Area Editor of IEEE Transactions on Communications. He has authored or co-authored more than 350 journal articles and book chapters and holds 28 U.S. patents. He is a fellow of the Institute of Electrical and Electronics Engineers (IEEE), the Optical Society of America (OSA) and the National Academy of Inventors (NAI), and a member of honor societies including Phi Beta Kappa and Sigma Xi. He was the recipient of the 1990 Rudolf Kingslake Medal for his paper entitled "Self-routing photonic switching with optically-processed control" and has won multiple teaching awards at Princeton.

He has been instrumental in founding the field of Neuromorphic Photonics and developing the "photonic neuron", a high speed optical computing device modeled on neural networks, as well as integrated optical circuits to improve wireless signal quality by cancelling radio interference.

He resides in Princeton with his wife Mindy and daughters Jenny and Katie.

== Recognition ==
- Fellow of the National Academy of Inventors (NAI) (2017)
- The President's Award for Distinguished Teaching, Princeton University (2015)
- Princeton University E-Council Lifetime Achievement Award for Excellence in Teaching (2014)
- E-Council Excellence in Teaching for ELE 203, 2006, 2012
- School of Engineering and Applied Science Distinguished Teacher Award, 2009
- SEAS Distinguished Teaching Award (2009)
- Walter Curtis Johnson Prize for Teaching Excellence, 2009
- E-Council Excellence in Teaching for ELE 454, 2008
- Princeton University Graduate Mentoring Award (2006)
- Gold Medal Award from the Faculty of Mathematics, Physics and Informatics at the Comenius University, for leadership in the field of Optics 2006
- Fellow of the Optical Society of America (1997)
- Fellow of the IEEE (1992)
- Rudolf Kingslake Medal and Prize, SPIE, for the most noteworthy original paper in Optical Engineering (1990)
- Phi Beta Kappa, Alpha of Maine Chapter, 1973
