= James G. Blaine =

American politician (1830–1893)

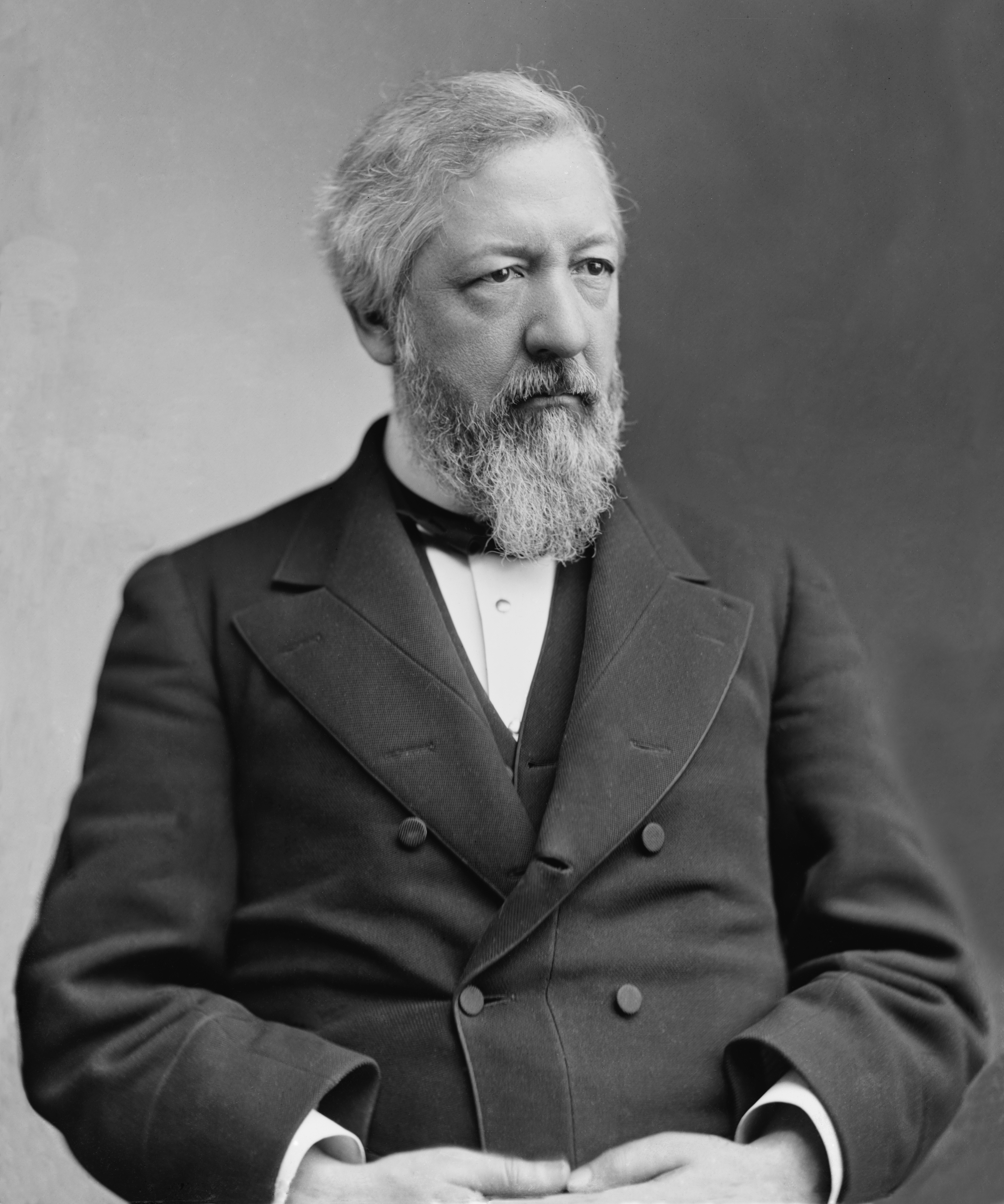
- Blaine, c. 1870–1880

28th & 31st United States Secretary of State
- In office March 9, 1889 – June 4, 1892
- President: Benjamin Harrison
- Preceded by: Thomas F. Bayard
- Succeeded by: John W. Foster
- In office March 7, 1881 – December 19, 1881
- President: James A. Garfield; Chester A. Arthur
- Preceded by: William M. Evarts
- Succeeded by: Frederick T. Frelinghuysen

United States Senator from Maine
- In office July 10, 1876 – March 5, 1881
- Preceded by: Lot M. Morrill
- Succeeded by: William P. Frye

27th Speaker of the United States House of Representatives
- In office March 4, 1869 – March 3, 1875
- Preceded by: Theodore Pomeroy
- Succeeded by: Michael C. Kerr

Leader of the House Republican Conference
- In office March 4, 1869 – March 3, 1875
- Preceded by: Theodore M. Pomeroy
- Succeeded by: Thomas Brackett Reed

Member of the U.S. House of Representatives from Maine's 3rd district
- In office March 4, 1863 – July 10, 1876
- Preceded by: Samuel C. Fessenden
- Succeeded by: Edwin Flye

30th Speaker of the Maine House of Representatives
- In office 1861–1862
- Preceded by: Frederick A. Pike
- Succeeded by: Nelson Dingley Jr.

Member of the Maine House of Representatives
- In office January 5, 1859 – January 6, 1863 Serving with William T. Johnson (1859–1860), Josiah P. Wyman (1860–1862), Vassal D. Pinkham (1862–1863)
- Preceded by: William T. Johnson, James S. Bicknell
- Succeeded by: Samuel Cony, Joshua S. Turner
- Constituency: Augusta

Personal details
- Born: James Gillespie Blaine; January 31, 1830 West Brownsville, Pennsylvania, U.S.
- Died: January 27, 1893 (aged 62) Washington, D.C., U.S.
- Resting place: Blaine Memorial Park, Augusta, Maine
- Party: Republican
- Spouse: Harriet Stanwood (m. 1850)
- Children: 7, including Walker
- Education: Washington and Jefferson College (BA)
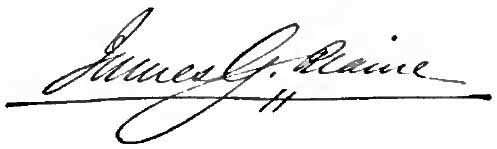
- Signature

James Gillespie Blaine (January 31, 1830 – January 27, 1893) was an American statesman and Republican politician who represented Maine in the United States House of Representatives from 1863 to 1876, served as Speaker of the House from 1869 to 1875, and was a United States senator from 1876 to 1881. He served twice as Secretary of State, under presidents James A. Garfield and Chester A. Arthur in 1881, and under Benjamin Harrison from 1889 to 1892. He sought the Republican presidential nomination in 1876 and 1880, and received the nomination in 1884, narrowly losing the general election to Democratic nominee Grover Cleveland. Blaine was a prominent figure in the moderate faction of the Republican Party, known as the "Half-Breeds".

Born in West Brownsville, Pennsylvania, Blaine moved to Maine after college, where he worked as a newspaper editor in Augusta before entering politics. Contemporary sources described him as an effective public speaker during an era when oratory was highly valued in American politics. He supported Abraham Lincoln and the Union cause during the American Civil War, and during Reconstruction he advocated for voting rights for former slaves while opposing some of the more punitive measures favored by Radical Republicans. His economic positions evolved from supporting high tariffs to favoring reduced tariffs and expanded international trade. Throughout his career, Blaine faced allegations of improper financial dealings with railroad companies, particularly concerning the Mulligan letters. While these allegations were never substantiated with conclusive evidence, they became a significant issue in his 1884 presidential campaign.

As Secretary of State, Blaine advocated for expanded American involvement in international affairs, marking a shift from the more limited foreign policy approaches of previous decades. He promoted increased trade relationships, particularly with Latin American nations, and supported policies that came to be known as tariff reciprocity. His diplomatic approach emphasized American commercial interests and included support for territorial expansion in the Caribbean and Pacific regions. His foreign policy initiatives contributed to the development of more assertive American international engagement that would be further expanded during and after the Spanish–American War.

== Early life ==
=== Family and childhood ===
James Gillespie Blaine was born January 31, 1830, in West Brownsville, Pennsylvania, the third child of Ephraim Lyon Blaine and Maria (Gillespie) Blaine. He had two older sisters, Harriet and Margaret. Blaine's father was a western Pennsylvania businessman and landowner, and the family lived in relative comfort. On his father's side, Blaine was descended from Scotch-Irish settlers who first emigrated to Pennsylvania in 1745. His great-grandfather Ephraim Blaine served as a Commissary-General under George Washington in the American Revolutionary War. Blaine's mother and her forebears were Irish Catholics who immigrated to Pennsylvania in the 1780s. Blaine's parents were married in 1820 in a Catholic ceremony, although Blaine's father remained a Presbyterian. Following a common compromise of the era, the Blaines agreed that their daughters would be raised in their mother's Catholic faith while their sons would be brought up in their father's religion. James Blaine's cousin, Angela Gillespie, was a nun and founded the American branch of the Sisters of the Holy Cross. In politics, Blaine's father supported the Whig Party.

Blaine's biographers describe his childhood as "harmonious," and note that the boy took an early interest in history and literature. At the age of thirteen, Blaine enrolled in his father's alma mater Washington College, in nearby Washington, Pennsylvania. There, he was a member of the Washington Literary Society, one of the college's debating societies. Blaine graduated near the top of his class and delivered the salutatory address in June 1847. Blaine then considered attending Yale Law School, but ultimately decided against it, and moved west to find a job.

=== Teacher and publisher ===
In 1848, Blaine was hired as a professor of mathematics and ancient languages at the Western Military Institute in Georgetown, Kentucky. Although he was only 18 years old and younger than many of his students, Blaine adapted well to his new profession. Blaine grew to enjoy life in his adopted state and became an admirer of Kentucky senator Henry Clay. He also made the acquaintance of Harriet Stanwood, a teacher at the nearby Millersburg Female College and native of Maine. On June 30, 1850, the two wed. Blaine once again considered the study of law, but instead took his new bride to visit his family in Pennsylvania. They next lived with Harriet Blaine's family in Augusta, Maine, for several months, where their first child, Stanwood Blaine, was born in 1851. The young family soon moved again, this time to Philadelphia where Blaine took a job at the Pennsylvania Institution for the Instruction of the Blind (now Overbrook School for the Blind) in 1852, teaching science and literature.

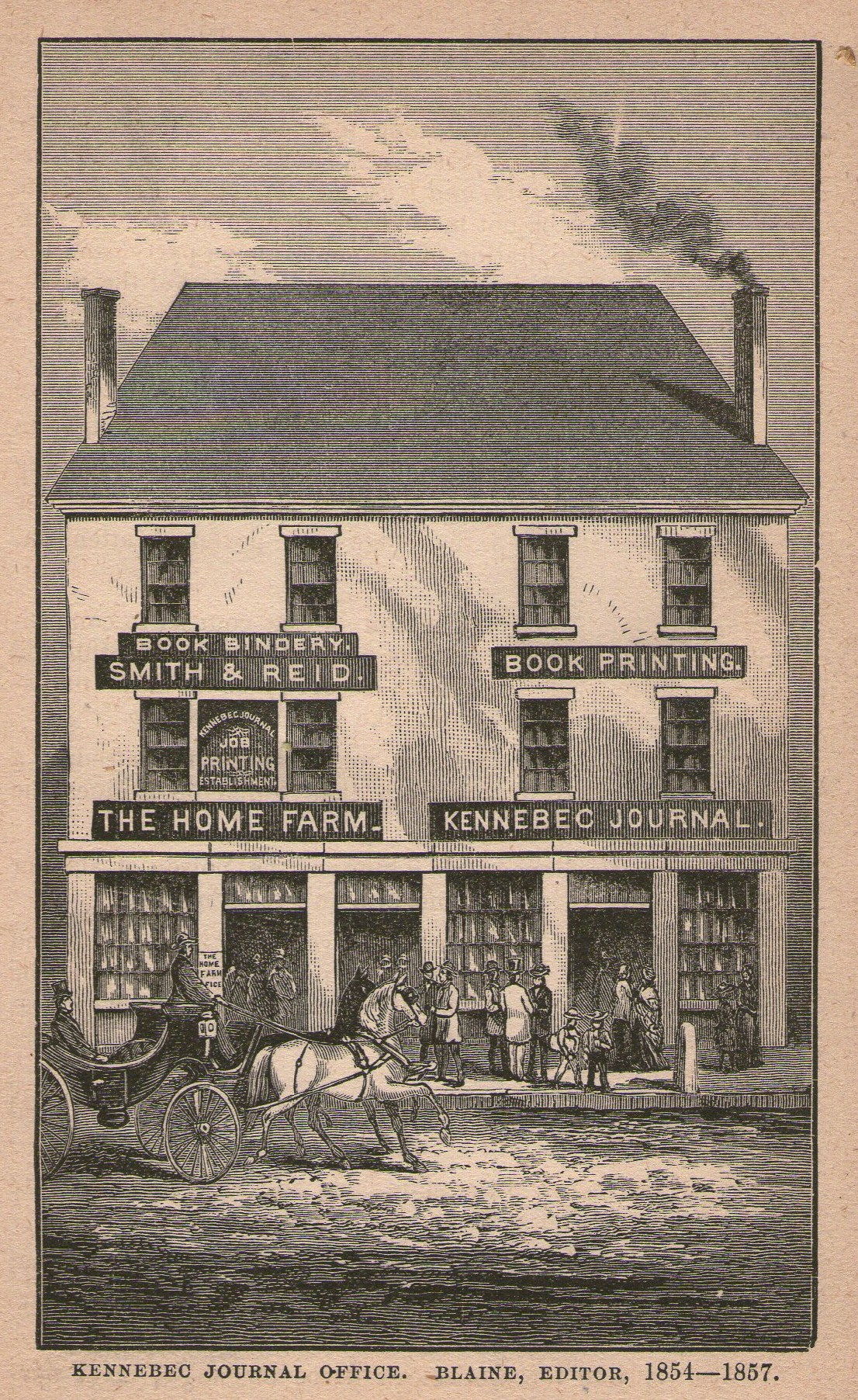
The offices of the Kennebec Journal, where Blaine got his start in politics as editor.

Philadelphia's law libraries gave Blaine the chance to, at last, begin to study the law, but in 1853 he received a more tempting offer: to become editor and co-owner of the Kennebec Journal. Blaine had spent several vacations in his wife's native state of Maine and had become friendly with the Journal's editors. When the newspaper's founder, Luther Severance, retired, Blaine was invited to purchase the publication along with co-editor Joseph Baker. He quickly accepted, borrowing the purchase price from his wife's brothers. In 1854, Baker sold his share to John L. Stevens, a local minister. The Journal had been a staunchly Whig newspaper, which coincided with Blaine's and Stevens' political opinions. The decision to become a newspaperman, unexpected as it was, started Blaine on the road to a lifelong career in politics. Blaine's purchase of the Journal coincided with the demise of the Whig party and the birth of the Republican party, and Blaine and Stevens actively promoted the new party in their newspaper. The newspaper was financially successful, and Blaine was soon able to invest his profits in coal mines in Pennsylvania and Virginia, forming the basis of his future wealth.

=== Maine politics ===
Blaine's career as a Republican newspaperman led naturally to involvement in party politics. In 1856, he was selected as a delegate to the first Republican National Convention. From the party's early days, Blaine identified with the conservative wing, supporting Supreme Court Justice John McLean for the presidential nomination over the more radical John C. Frémont, the eventual nominee. The following year, Blaine was offered the editorship of the Portland Daily Advertiser, which he accepted, selling his interest in the Journal soon thereafter. He still maintained his home in Augusta, however, with his growing family. Although Blaine's first son, Stanwood, died in infancy, he and Harriet had two more sons soon afterward: Walker, in 1855, and Emmons, in 1857. They would have four more children in years to come: Alice, James, Margaret, and Harriet. It was around this time that Blaine left the Presbyterian church of his childhood and joined his wife's new denomination, becoming a member of the South Parish Congregational Church in Augusta.

In 1858, Blaine ran for a seat in the Maine House of Representatives, and was elected. He ran for reelection in 1859, 1860, and 1861, and was successful each time by large majorities. The added responsibilities led Blaine to reduce his duties with the Advertiser in 1860, and he soon ceased editorial work altogether. Meanwhile, his political power was growing as he became chairman of the Republican state committee in 1859, replacing Stevens. Blaine was not a delegate to the Republican convention in 1860, but attended anyway as an enthusiastic supporter of Abraham Lincoln. Returning to Maine, he was elected Speaker of the Maine House of Representatives in 1861 and reelected in 1862. With the outbreak of the Civil War in 1861, he supported Lincoln's war effort and saw that the Maine Legislature voted to organize and equip units to join the Union Army.

== House of Representatives, 1863–1876 ==
=== Elected to the House ===
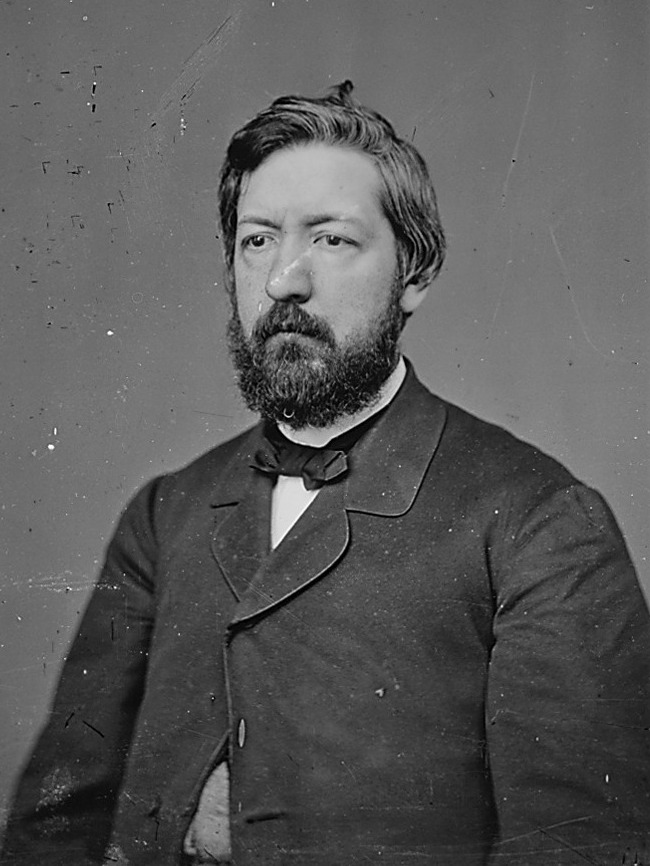
Portrait by Mathew Brady c. 1863–1865

Blaine had considered running for the United States House of Representatives from Maine's 4th district in 1860, but agreed to step aside when Anson P. Morrill, a former governor, announced his interest in the seat. Morrill was successful, but after redistricting placed Blaine in the 3rd district for the 1862 election, he allowed his name to be put forward. Running on a campaign of staunch support for the war effort, Blaine was elected by a wide margin; though nationwide, the Republican Party lost a significant number of seats in Congress as the Union war effort to date had been only weakly successful. By the time Blaine took his seat in December 1863, at the start of the 38th Congress, the Union Army had turned the tide of the war with victories at Gettysburg and Vicksburg.

As a first-term congressman, he initially said little, mostly following the administration's lead in supporting the continuing war effort. He did clash several times with the leader of the Republicans' radical faction, Thaddeus Stevens of Pennsylvania, firstly over payment of states' debts incurred in supporting the war, and again over monetary policy concerning the new greenback currency. Blaine also spoke in support of the commutation provision of the military draft law passed in 1863 and proposed a constitutional amendment allowing the federal government to impose taxes on exports, but it never passed.

=== Reconstruction and impeachment ===
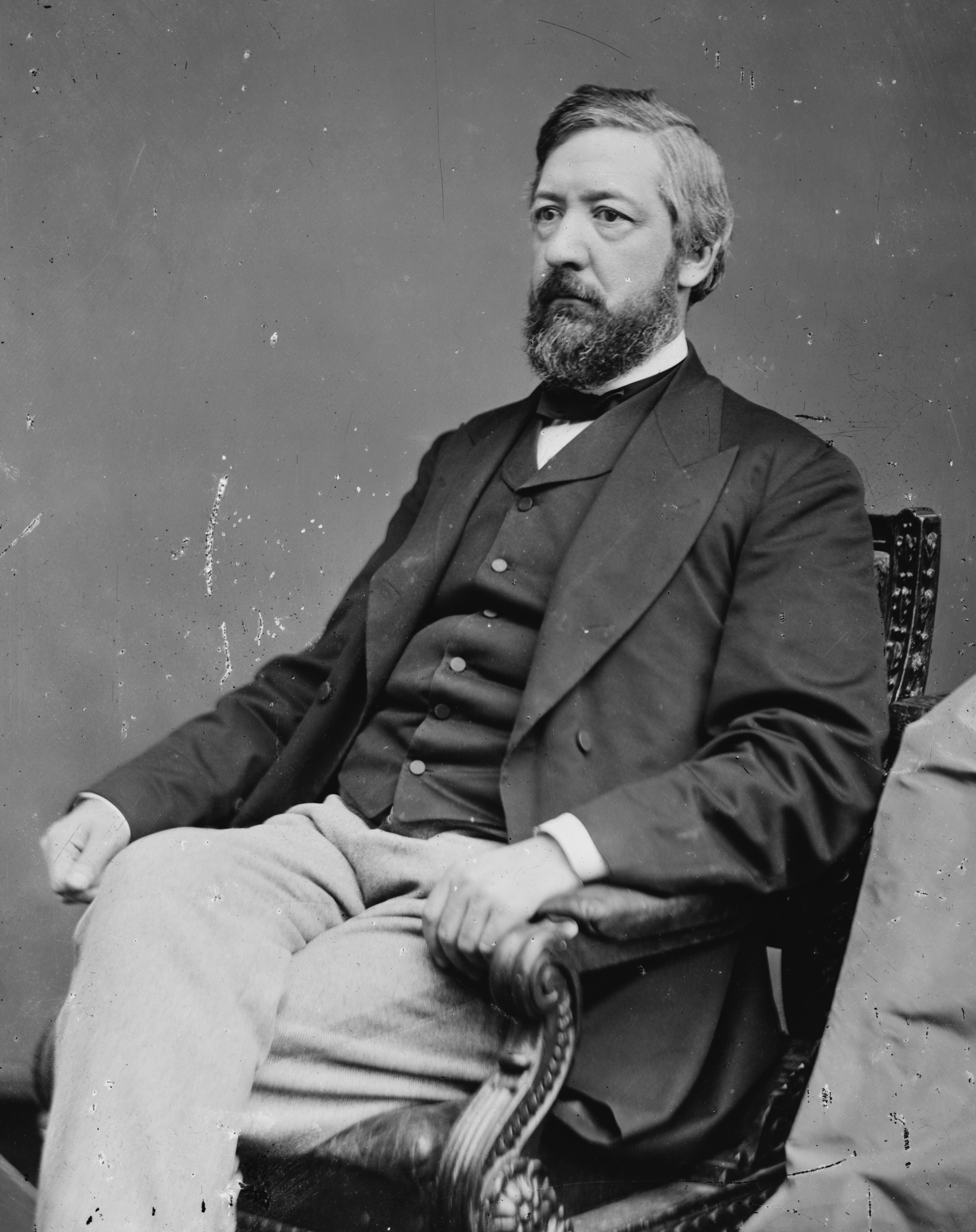
Portrait by Mathew Brady c. 1863–1875

Blaine was reelected in 1864 and, when the 39th Congress assembled in December 1865, the main issue was the Reconstruction of the defeated Confederate States. Although he was not a member of the committee charged with drafting what became the Fourteenth Amendment, Blaine did make his views on the subject known and believed that three-fourths of the non-seceded states would be needed to ratify it, rather than three-fourths of all states, an opinion that did not prevail and placed him, atypically, in the radical camp. The Republican Congress also played a role in the governance of the conquered South, dissolving the state governments President Andrew Johnson had installed and substituting military governments under Congress' control. Blaine voted in favor of these new, harsher measures, but also supported some leniency toward the former rebels when he opposed a bill that would have barred Southerners from attending the United States Military Academy. Blaine voted to impeach Johnson in 1868, although he had initially opposed the effort. Later, Blaine was more ambiguous about the validity of the charges against Johnson, writing that "there was a very grave difference of opinion among those equally competent to decide," but he followed his party's leaders.

=== Monetary policy ===
Continuing his earlier battle with Stevens, Blaine led the fight in Congress for a strong dollar. After the issuance of 150 million dollars in greenbacks—non-gold-backed currency—the value of the dollar stood at a low ebb. A bipartisan group of inflationists, led by Republican Benjamin F. Butler and Democrat George H. Pendleton, wished to preserve the status quo and allow the Treasury to continue to issue greenbacks and even to use them to pay the interest due on pre-war bonds. Blaine called this idea a repudiation of the nation's promise to investors, which was made when the only currency was gold. Speaking several times on the matter, Blaine said that the greenbacks had only ever been an emergency measure to avoid bankruptcy during the war. Blaine and his hard money allies were successful, but the issue remained alive until 1879, when all remaining greenbacks were made redeemable in gold by the Specie Payment Resumption Act of 1875.

=== Speaker of the House ===
During his first three terms in Congress, Blaine had earned for himself a reputation as an expert of parliamentary procedure, and, aside from a growing feud with Roscoe Conkling of New York, had become popular among his fellow Republicans. In March 1869, when Speaker Schuyler Colfax resigned from office at the end of the 40th Congress to become vice president, the highly regarded Blaine was the unanimous choice of the Republican Congressional Caucus to become Speaker of the House for the 41st Congress. In the subsequent March 4, 1869, election for Speaker, Blaine easily defeated Democrat Michael C. Kerr of Indiana by a vote of 135 to 57. Republicans remained in control of the House in the 42nd and 43rd congresses, and Blaine was re-elected as speaker at the start of both of them. His time as speaker came to an end following the 1874-75 elections which produced a Democratic majority in the House for the 44th Congress.

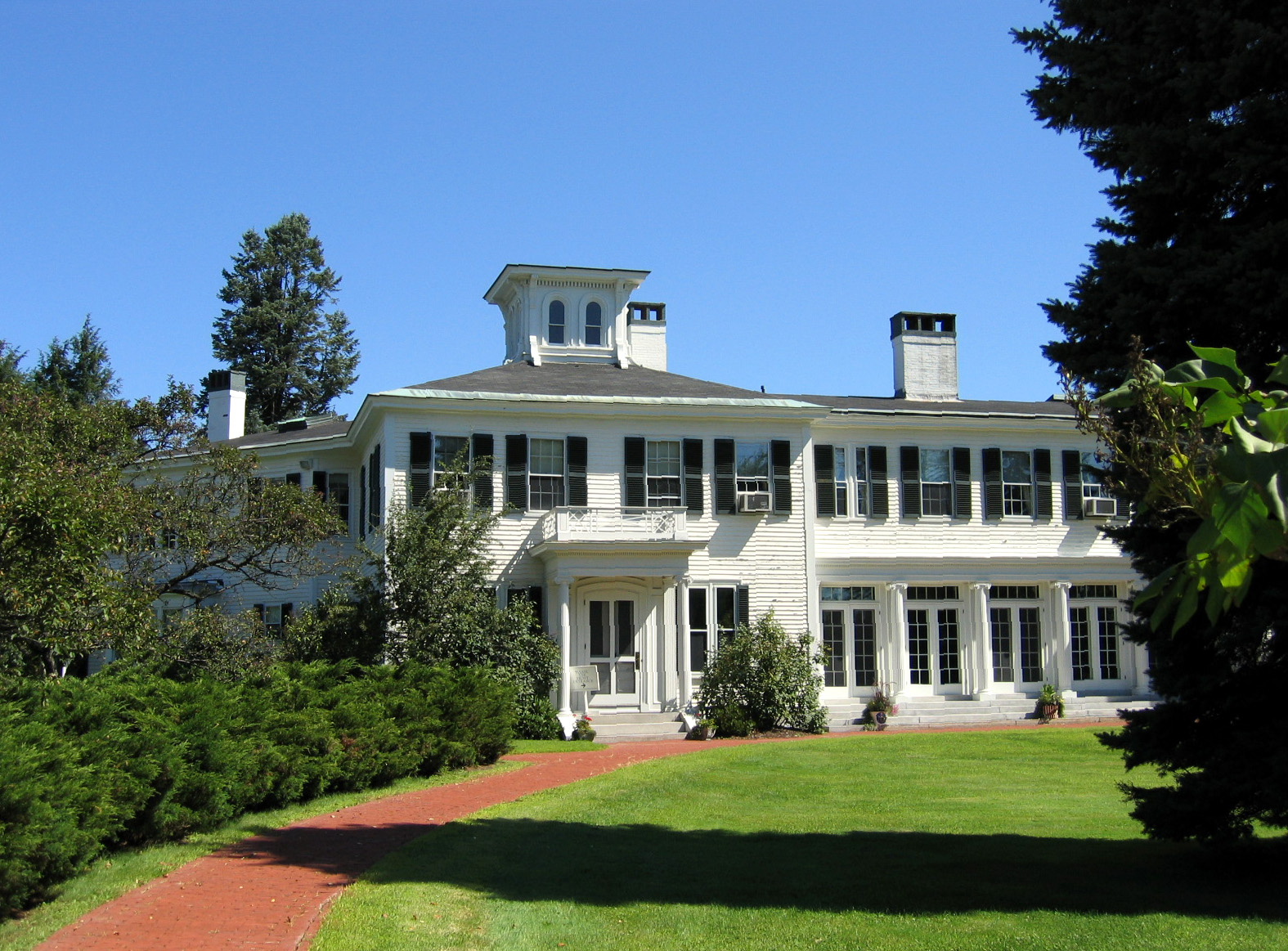
Blaine's residence in the capital city of Augusta is the home of Maine governors.

Blaine was an effective Speaker with a magnetic personality. In the words of Washington journalist Benjamin Perley Poore, Blaine's "graceful as well as powerful figure, his strong features, glowing with health, and his hearty, honest manner, made him an attractive speaker and an esteemed friend." Moreover, President Ulysses S. Grant valued his skill and loyalty in leading the House. He enjoyed the job and made his presence in Washington more permanent by buying a large residence on Fifteenth Street in the city. At the same time, the Blaine family moved to a mansion in Augusta. (Note: The house was donated to the State of Maine by Blaine's daughter, Harriet Blaine Beale, in 1919 and is now used as the Governor's residence.)

During Blaine's six-year tenure as Speaker his popularity continued to grow, and Republicans dissatisfied with Grant mentioned Blaine as a potential presidential candidate prior to the 1872 Republican National Convention. Instead, Blaine worked steadfastly for Grant's re-election. Blaine's growing fame brought growing opposition from the Democrats, as well, and during the 1872 campaign he was accused of receiving bribes in the Crédit Mobilier scandal. Blaine denied any part in the scandal, which involved railroad companies bribing federal officials to turn a blind eye to fraudulent railroad contracts that overcharged the government by millions of dollars. No one was able to satisfactorily prove Blaine's involvement. Though not an absolute defense, it is true that the law that made the fraud possible had been written before he was elected to Congress. But other Republicans were exposed by the accusations, including Vice President Colfax, who was dropped from the 1872 presidential ticket in favor of Henry Wilson.

Although he supported a general amnesty for former Confederates, Blaine opposed extending it to include Jefferson Davis, and he cooperated with Grant in helping to pass the Civil Rights Act of 1875 in response to increased violence and disenfranchisement of blacks in the South. He refrained from voting on the anti-third term resolution that overwhelmingly passed the House that same year, believing that to vote for it would look self-interested. Blaine was loyal to Grant, and the scandals of the Grant administration did not seem to affect how the public perceived him; according to his biographer, Blaine was never more popular than when he was Speaker. Liberal Republicans saw him as an alternative to the evident corruption of other Republican leaders, and some even urged him to form a new, reformist party. Although he remained a Republican, this base of moderate reformers remained loyal to Blaine and became known as the Half Breed faction of the party.

=== Blaine Amendment ===
Once out of the speaker's chair, Blaine had more time to concentrate on his presidential ambitions, and to develop new policy ideas. One result was a foray into education policy. In late 1875, President Grant made several speeches on the importance of the separation of church and state and the duty of the states to provide free public education. Blaine saw in this an issue that would distract from the Grant administration scandals and let the Republican party regain the high moral ground. In December 1875, he proposed a joint resolution that became known as the Blaine Amendment.

The proposed amendment codified the church-state separation Blaine and Grant were promoting, stating that:

No State shall make any law respecting an establishment of religion, or prohibiting the free exercise thereof; and no money raised by taxation in any State for the support of public schools, or derived from any public fund therefor, nor any public lands devoted thereto, shall ever be under the control of any religious sect; nor shall any money so raised or lands so devoted be divided between religious sects or denominations. (Note: While the First Amendment already imposed the first two restrictions on the federal government, they were not deemed to apply to the states until 1947 and 1940, respectively.)

The effect was to prohibit the use of public funds by any religious school, although it did not advance Grant's other aim of requiring states to provide public education to all children. The bill passed the House but failed in the Senate. Although it never passed Congress, and left Blaine open to charges of anti-Catholicism, the proposed amendment served Blaine's purpose of rallying Protestants to the Republican party and promoting himself as one of the party's foremost leaders.

== 1876 presidential election ==
=== Mulligan letters ===
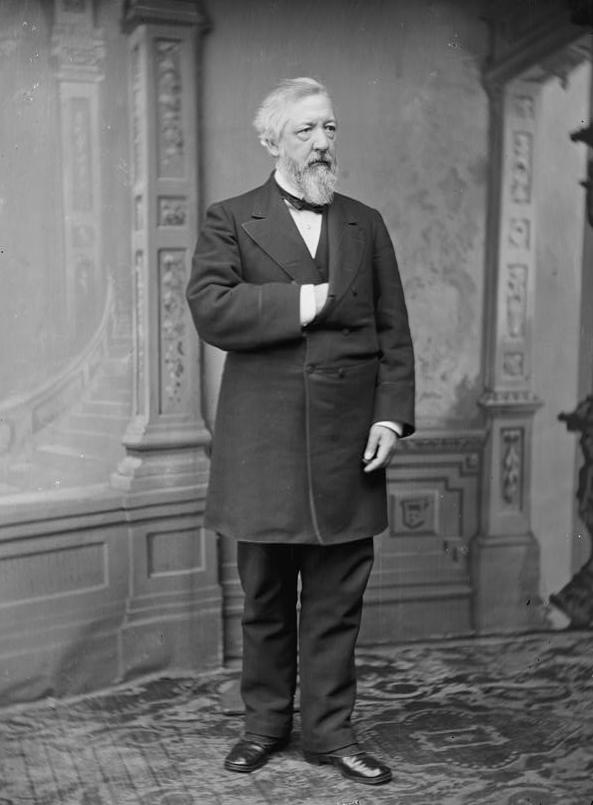
James G. Blaine in the 1870s

Blaine entered the 1876 presidential campaign as the favorite, but his chances were almost immediately harmed by the emergence of a scandal. Rumors had begun to spread in February that Blaine had been involved in a transaction with the Union Pacific Railroad which had paid Blaine $64,000 (Note: Equivalent to $1.94 million in 2025) for some Little Rock and Fort Smith Railroad bonds he owned even though they were nearly worthless. In essence, the alleged transaction was presented as a sham designed to bribe Blaine. Blaine denied the charges, as did the Union Pacific's directors. Blaine claimed that he never had any dealings with the Little Rock and Fort Smith Railroad except to purchase bonds at market price and that he had lost money on the transaction. Democrats in the House of Representatives, however, demanded a congressional investigation. The testimony appeared to favor Blaine's version of events until May 31, when James Mulligan, a Boston clerk who had been employed by Blaine's brother-in-law, testified that the allegations were true, that he had arranged the transaction, and that he had letters to prove it. The letters ended with the damning phrase: "Kindly burn this letter." When the investigating committee recessed, Blaine met with Mulligan that night in his hotel room. What happened between the men is unclear, but Blaine acquired the letters or, as Mulligan told the committee, snatched them from Mulligan's hands, and fled the room. In any event, Blaine had the letters and refused the committee's demand to turn them over.

Opinion swiftly turned against Blaine. The June 3 New York Times carried the headline "Blaine's Nomination Now Out of the Question." Blaine took his case to the House floor on June 5, theatrically proclaiming his innocence and calling the investigation a partisan attack by Southern Democrats in revenge for his exclusion of Jefferson Davis from the amnesty bill of the previous year. He read selected passages from the letters aloud and said, "Thank God Almighty, I am not afraid to show them!" Blaine even succeeded in extracting an apology from the committee chairman. The political tide turned anew in Blaine's favor, but the pressure had begun to affect Blaine's health, and he collapsed while leaving church services on June 14. His opponents called the collapse a political stunt, with one Democratic newspaper reporting the event as "Blaine Feigns a Faint." Rumors of Blaine's ill health, combined with the lack of hard evidence against him, garnered him sympathy among Republicans and, when the Republican convention began in Cincinnati later that month, he was again seen as the frontrunner.

=== Plumed Knight ===
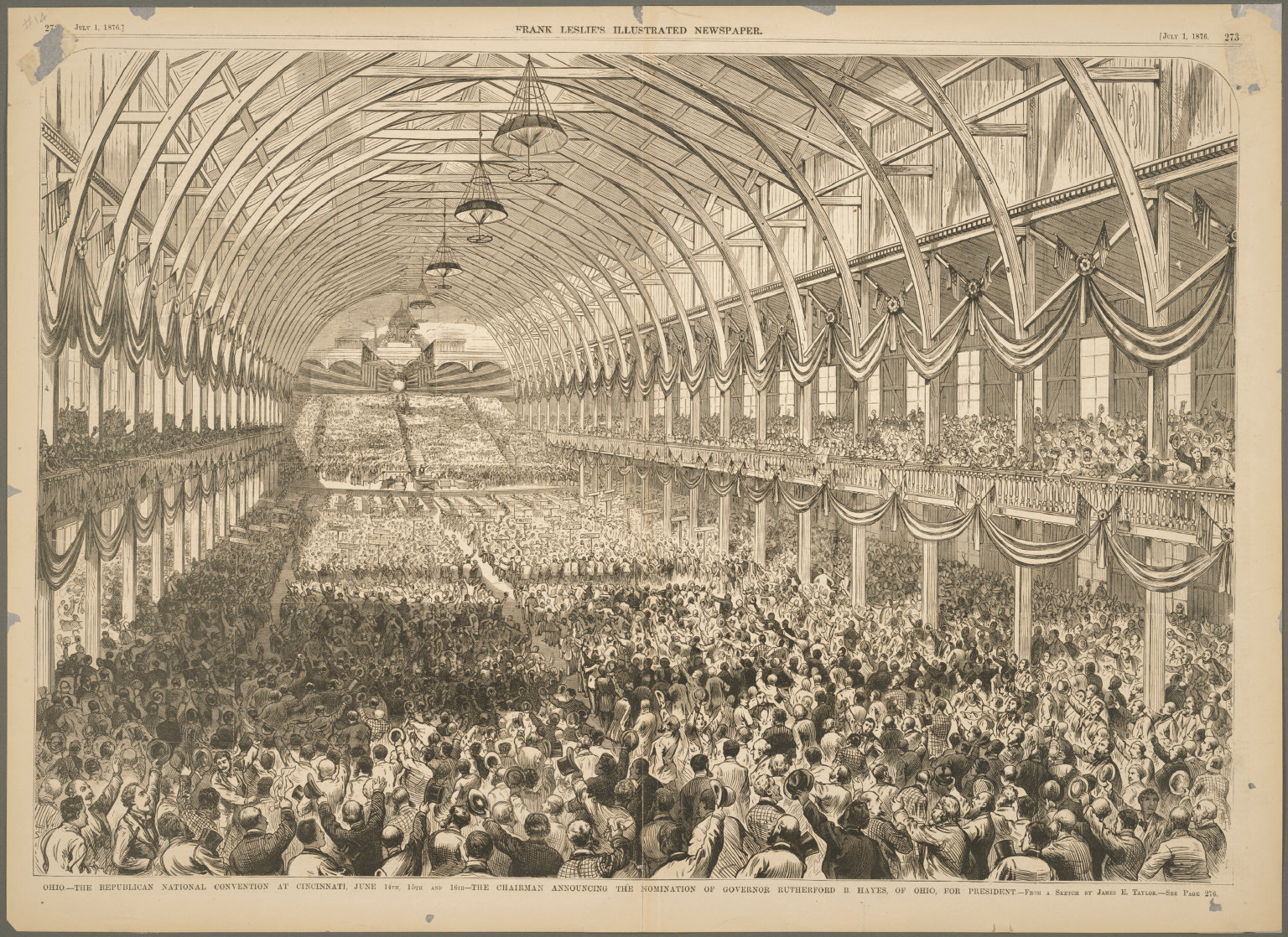
Exposition Hall of Cincinnati during the announcement of Rutherford B. Hayes as the Republican nominee

Though he was damaged by the Mulligan letters, Blaine entered the convention as the favorite. Five other men were also considered serious candidates: Benjamin Bristow, the Kentucky-born Treasury Secretary; Roscoe Conkling, Blaine's old enemy and now a senator from New York; Senator Oliver P. Morton of Indiana; Governor Rutherford B. Hayes of Ohio; and Governor John F. Hartranft of Pennsylvania.

Blaine was nominated by Illinois orator Robert G. Ingersoll in what became a famous speech:

This is a grand year—a year filled with recollections of the Revolution ... a year in which the people call for the man who has torn from the throat of treason the tongue of slander, the man who has snatched the mask of Democracy from the hideous face of rebellion ... Like an armed warrior, like a plumed knight, James G. Blaine from the state of Maine marched down the halls of the American Congress and threw his shining lance full and fair against the brazen foreheads of every traitor to his country and every maligner of his fair reputation.

The speech was a success and Ingersoll's description of Blaine as a "plumed knight" remained a nickname for Blaine for years to come. On the first ballot, no candidate received the required majority of 378, but Blaine had the most votes, with 285, and no other candidate had more than 125. There were a few vote shifts in the next five ballots, and Blaine climbed to 308 votes, with his nearest competitor having just 111. On the seventh ballot, however, the situation shifted drastically because anti-Blaine delegates began to coalesce around Hayes. By the time the balloting ended, Blaine's votes had risen to 351, but Hayes surpassed him with 384, a majority.

Blaine received the news at his home in Washington and telegraphed Hayes his congratulations. In the subsequent contest of 1876, Hayes was elected after a contentious compromise over disputed electoral votes. The results of the convention had further effects on Blaine's political career because Bristow, having lost the nomination, resigned as Treasury Secretary three days after the convention ended. President Grant selected Senator Lot M. Morrill of Maine to fill the cabinet post, and Maine's governor, Seldon Connor, appointed Blaine to the now-vacant Senate seat. When the Maine Legislature reconvened that autumn, it confirmed Blaine's appointment and elected him to the full six-year term that would begin on March 4, 1877. (Note: Before the passage of the Seventeenth Amendment to the United States Constitution in 1913, Senators were chosen by their states' legislatures.)

== United States Senate, 1876–1881 ==
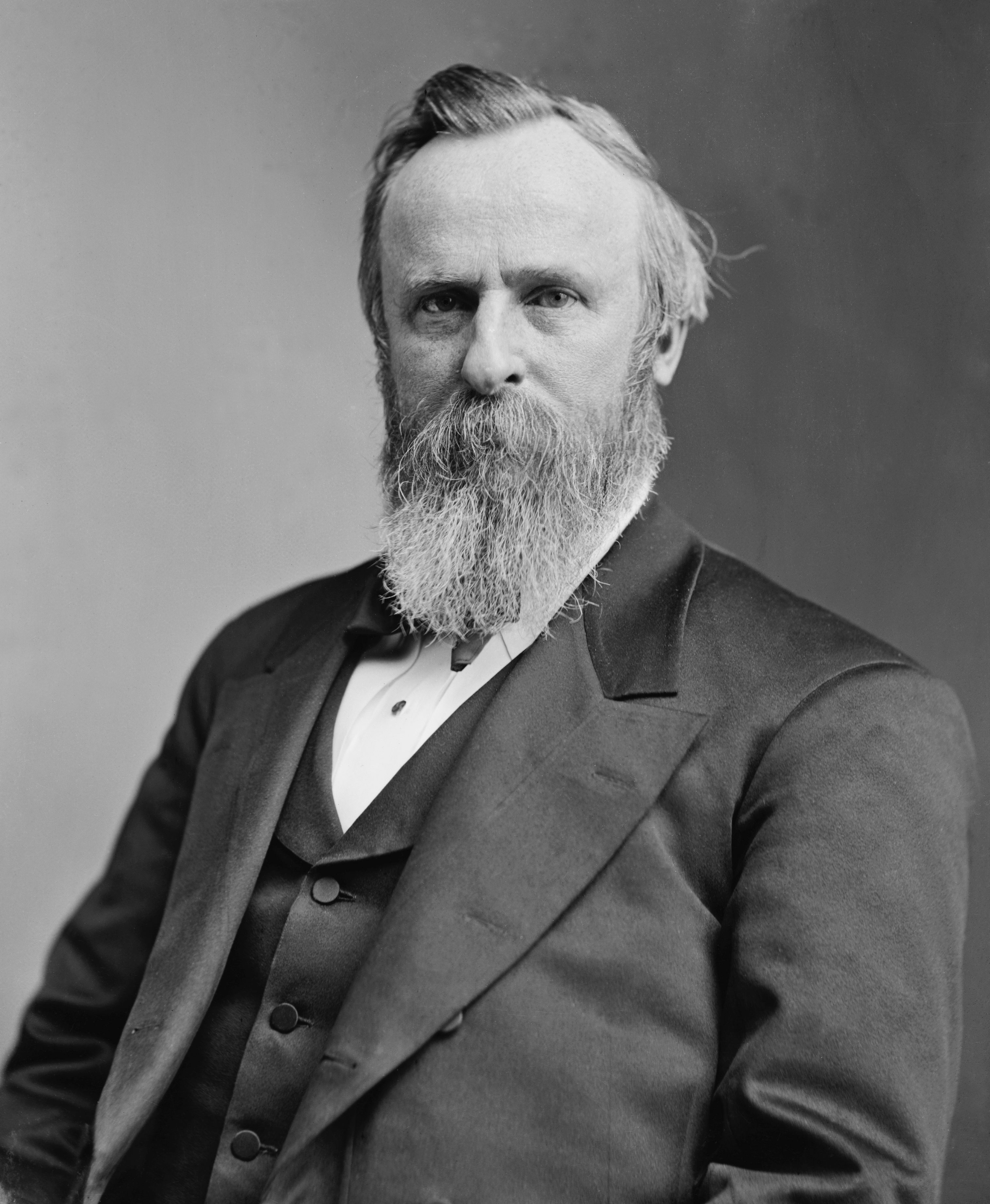
Blaine worked with President Hayes (pictured) at times, but was never among his chief defenders in the Senate

Blaine was appointed to the Senate on July 10, 1876, but did not begin his duties there until the Senate convened in December of that year. While in the Senate, he served on the Appropriations Committee and held the chairmanship of the Committee on Civil Service and Retrenchment, but he never achieved the role of leadership that he had held as a member of the House. The Senate in the 45th Congress was controlled by a narrow Republican majority, but it was a majority often divided against itself and against the Hayes administration. Blaine did not number himself among the administration's defenders—later known as the Half-Breeds—but neither could he join the Republicans led by Conkling—later known as the Stalwarts—who opposed Hayes, because of the deep personal enmity between Blaine and Conkling. He opposed Hayes's withdrawal of federal troops from Southern capitals, which effectively ended the Reconstruction of the South, but to no avail. Blaine continued to antagonize Southern Democrats, voting against bills passed in the Democrat-controlled House that would reduce the Army's appropriation and repeal the post-war Enforcement Acts he had helped pass. Such bills passed Congress several times and Hayes vetoed them several times; ultimately, the Enforcement Acts remained in place, but the funds to enforce them dwindled. By 1879, there were only 1,155 soldiers stationed in the former Confederacy, and Blaine believed that this small force could never guarantee the civil and political rights of black Southerners—which would mean an end to the Republican party in the South.

On monetary issues, Blaine continued the advocacy for a strong dollar that he had begun as a Representative. This stance was in opposition to Senate Republican leadership, including Senate president pro tempore Thomas W. Ferry, who generally supported the greenback movement. The issue had shifted from debate over greenbacks to debate over which metal should back the dollar: gold and silver, or gold alone. The Coinage Act of 1873 stopped the coinage of silver for all coins worth a dollar or more, effectively tying the dollar to the value of gold. As a result, the money supply contracted and the effects of the Panic of 1873 grew worse, making it more expensive for debtors to pay debts they had entered into when currency was less valuable. Farmers and laborers, especially, clamored for the return of coinage in both metals, believing the increased money supply would restore wages and property values. Democratic Representative Richard P. Bland of Missouri proposed a bill, which passed the House, that required the United States to coin as much silver as miners could sell the government, thus increasing the money supply and aiding debtors. In the Senate, William B. Allison, a Republican from Iowa offered an amendment to limit the silver coinage to two to four million dollars per month. This was still too much for Blaine, and he denounced the bill and the proposed amendment, but the amended Bland–Allison Act passed the Senate by a 48 to 21 vote. Hayes vetoed the bill, but Congress mustered the two-thirds vote to pass it over his veto. Even after the Bland–Allison Act's passage, Blaine continued his opposition, making a series of speeches against it during the 1878 congressional campaign season.

His time in the Senate allowed Blaine to develop his foreign policy ideas. He advocated expansion of the American navy and merchant marine, which had been in decline since the Civil War. Blaine also bitterly opposed the results of the arbitration with Great Britain over American fishermen's right to fish in Canadian waters, which resulted in a $5.5 million (Note: Equivalent to $158 million in 2025) award to Britain. Blaine's Anglophobia combined with his support of high tariffs. He had initially opposed a reciprocity treaty with Canada that would have reduced tariffs between the two nations, but by the end of his time in the Senate, he had changed his mind, believing that Americans had more to gain by increasing exports than they would lose by the risk of cheap imports.

== 1880 presidential election ==
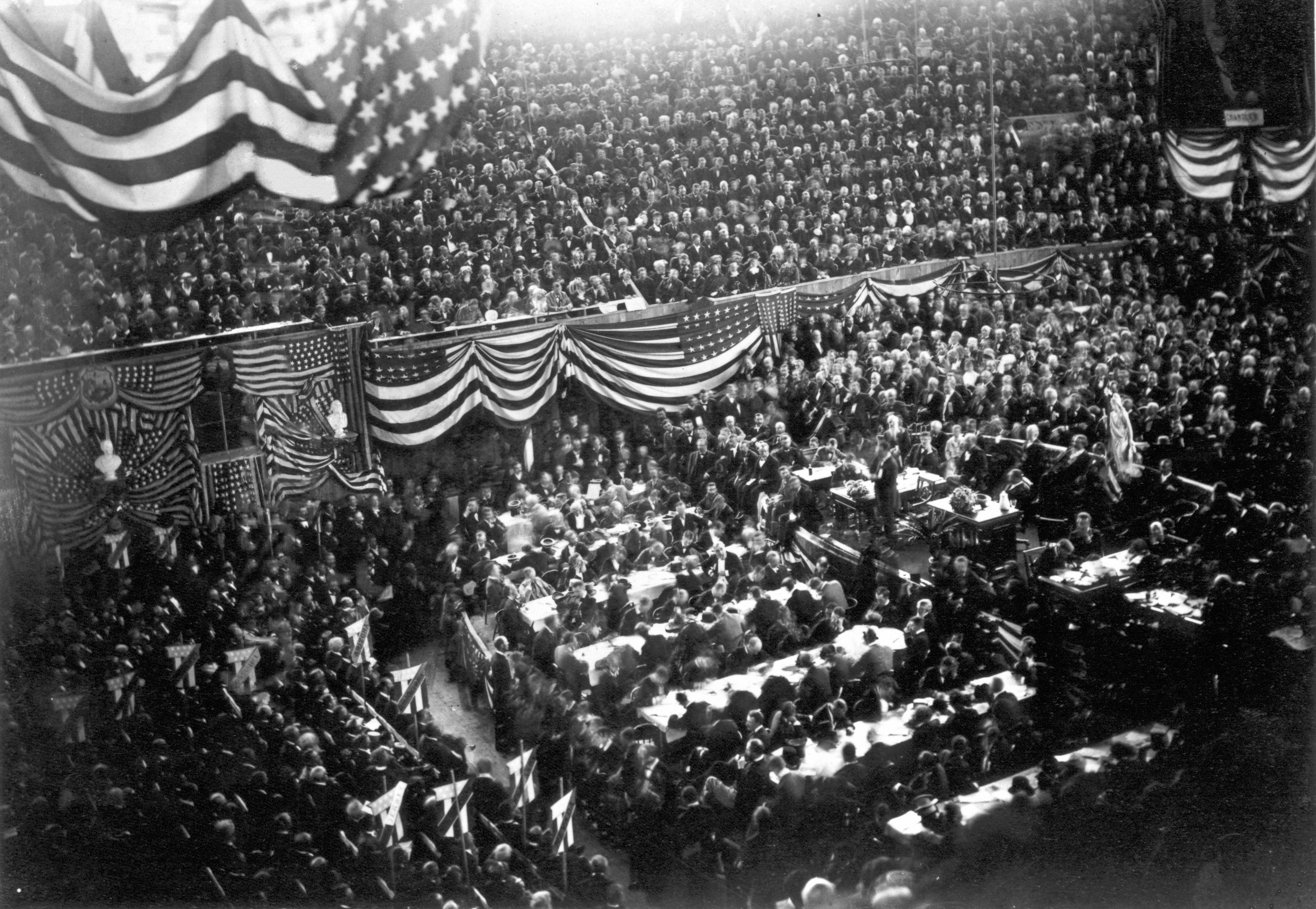
The Interstate Exposition Building (known as the "Glass Palace") during the convention; James A. Garfield is on the podium, waiting to speak.

Hayes had announced early in his presidency that he would not seek another term which meant that the contest for the Republican nomination in 1880 was open to all challengers—including Blaine. Blaine was among the early favorites for the nomination, as were former president Grant, Treasury Secretary John Sherman of Ohio, and Senator George F. Edmunds of Vermont. Although Grant did not actively promote his candidacy, his entry into the race re-energized the Stalwarts and when the convention met in Chicago in June 1880, they instantly polarized the delegates into Grant and anti-Grant factions, with Blaine the most popular choice of the latter group. Blaine was nominated by James Frederick Joy of Michigan, but in contrast to Ingersoll's exciting speech of 1876, Joy's lengthy oration was remembered only for its maladroitness. After the other candidates were nominated, the first ballot showed Grant leading with 304 votes and Blaine in second with 284; no other candidate had more than Sherman's 93, and none had the required majority of 379. Sherman's delegates could swing the nomination to either Grant or Blaine, but he refused to release them through twenty-eight ballots in the hope that the anti-Grant forces would desert Blaine and flock to him. Eventually, they did desert Blaine, but instead of Sherman they shifted their votes to Ohio Congressman James A. Garfield, and by the thirty-sixth ballot he had 399 votes, enough for victory.

Garfield placated the Stalwarts by endorsing Chester A. Arthur of New York, a Conkling loyalist, as nominee for vice president, but it was to Blaine and his delegates that Garfield owed his nomination. When Garfield was elected over Democrat Winfield Scott Hancock, he turned to Blaine to guide him in selection of his cabinet and offered him the preeminent position: Secretary of State. Blaine accepted, resigning from the Senate on March 4, 1881.

== Blaine Clubs ==
George B. Cox set up the Young Men's Blaine Club of Cincinnati, Ohio. Charles A. Boutelle served as the president of the Maine Blaine Club at the national convention of 1880.

== Secretary of State, 1881 ==
=== Foreign policy initiatives ===
Blaine saw presiding over the cabinet as a chance to preside over the Washington social scene, as well, and soon ordered construction of a new, larger home near Dupont Circle. Although his foreign policy experience was minimal, Blaine quickly threw himself into his new duties. By 1881, Blaine had completely abandoned his protectionist leanings and now used his position as Secretary of State to promote freer trade, especially within the Western Hemisphere. His reasons were twofold: firstly, Blaine's old fear of British interference in the Americas was undiminished, and he saw increased trade with Latin America as the best way to keep Britain from dominating the region. Secondly, he believed that by encouraging exports, he could increase American prosperity, and by doing so position the Republican party as the author of that prosperity, ensuring continued electoral success. Garfield agreed with his Secretary of State's vision and Blaine called for a Pan-American conference in 1882 to mediate disputes among the Latin American nations and to serve as a forum for talks on increasing trade. At the same time, Blaine hoped to negotiate a peace in the War of the Pacific then being fought by Bolivia, Chile, and Peru. Blaine favored a resolution that would not result in Peru yielding any territory, but Chile, which had by 1881 occupied the Peruvian capital, rejected any negotiations that would gain them nothing. Blaine sought to expand American influence in other areas, calling for renegotiation of the Clayton–Bulwer Treaty to allow the United States to construct a canal through Panama without British involvement, as well as attempting to reduce British involvement in the strategically located Kingdom of Hawaii. His plans for the United States' involvement in the world stretched even beyond the Western Hemisphere, as he sought commercial treaties with Korea and Madagascar.

=== Garfield's assassination ===
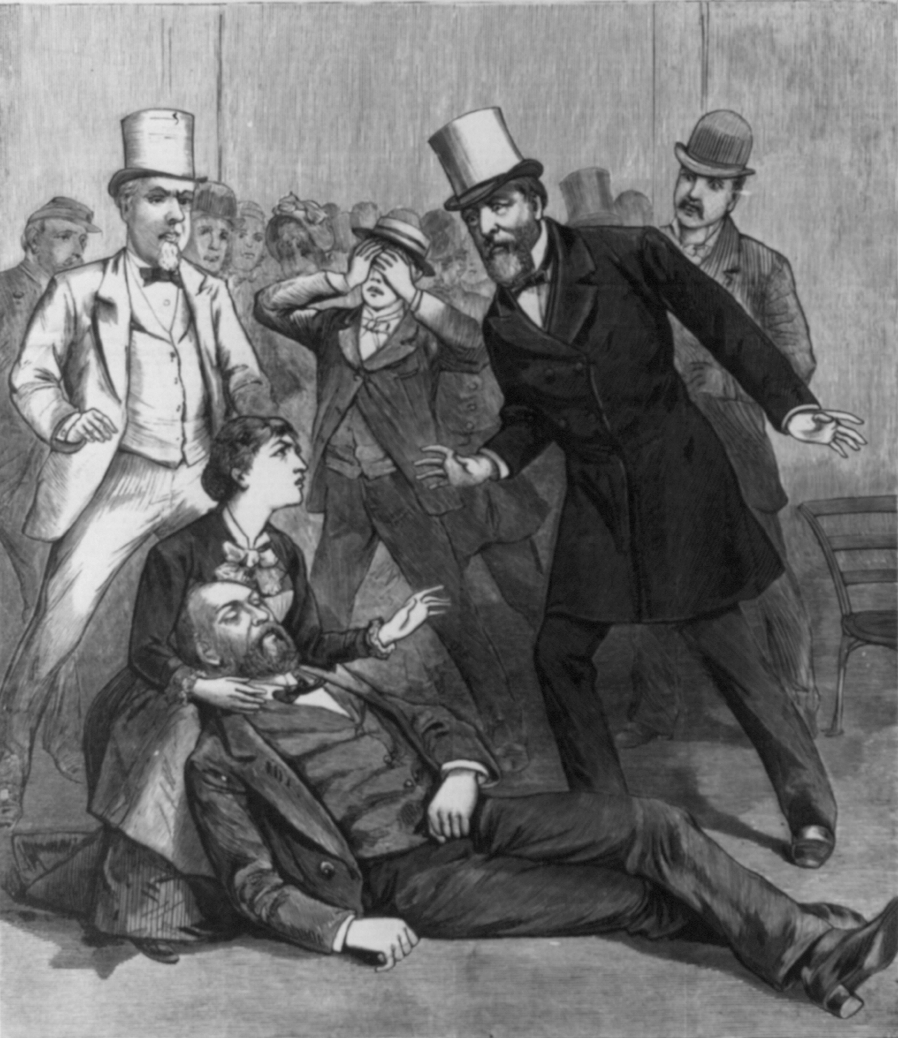
Blaine (right) was present at Garfield's shooting.

On July 2, 1881, Blaine and Garfield were walking through the Sixth Street Station of the Baltimore and Potomac Railroad in Washington when Garfield was shot by Charles J. Guiteau, a crazed office seeker who had made repeated demands for Blaine and other State Department officials to appoint him to a consulship for which he was grossly unqualified. On May 14, 1881, Guiteau had encountered Blaine just outside the State Department. Guiteau's request for a position in the US Consul's office in France was met by an angry rebuke from Blaine: "Never speak to me about the Paris Consulship again as long as you live!"

Guiteau, a self-professed Stalwart, believed that after assassinating the president, he would strike a blow to unite the two factions of the Republican Party, allowing him to ingratiate himself with Vice President Arthur and receive his coveted position. Guiteau was arrested immediately, while Garfield lingered for two months before he died on September 19, 1881. Guiteau was convicted of killing Garfield and hanged in 1882.

Garfield's death was not just a personal tragedy for Blaine; it also meant the end of his dominance of the cabinet, and the end of his foreign policy initiatives. With Arthur's ascent to the presidency, the Stalwart faction now held sway, and Blaine's days at the State Department were numbered. While Arthur asked all of the cabinet members to postpone their resignations until Congress recessed that December, Blaine nonetheless tendered his resignation on October 19, 1881, but he agreed to remain in office until December 19, when his successor would be in place.

Blaine's replacement was Frederick T. Frelinghuysen, a New Jersey Stalwart; while Arthur and Frelinghuysen undid much of Blaine's work, cancelling the call for a Pan-American conference and stopping the effort to end the War of the Pacific, they did continue the drive for tariff reductions, signing a reciprocity treaty with Mexico in 1882.

=== Private life ===
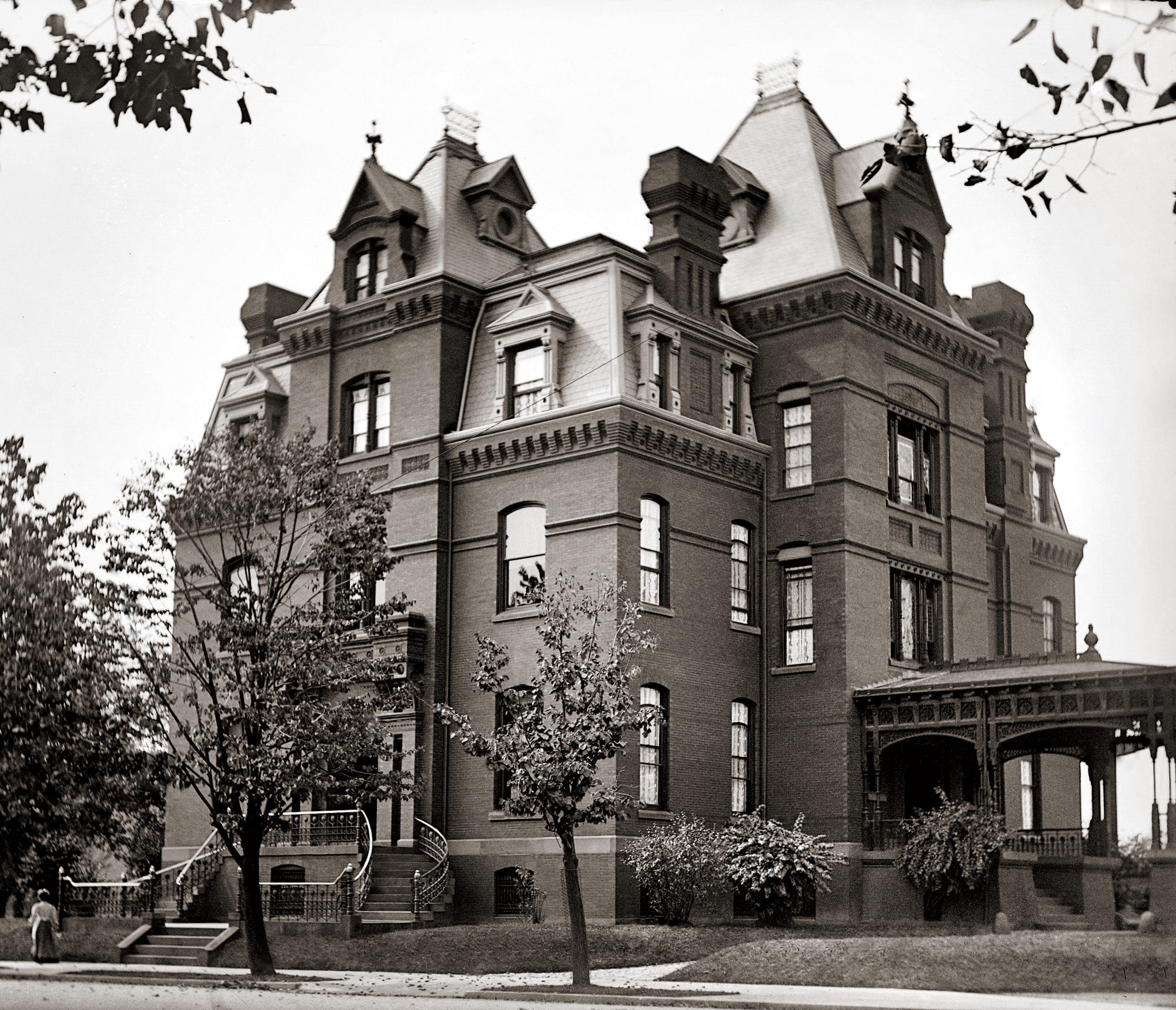
Blaine's mansion in Dupont Circle

Blaine began the year 1882 without a political office for the first time since 1859. Troubled by poor health, (Note: The exact state of Blaine's health is debatable; many of his biographers believe him to have been a hypochondriac.) he sought no employment other than the completion of the first volume of his memoir, Twenty Years of Congress: From Lincoln to Garfield. Friends in Maine petitioned Blaine to run for Congress in the 1882 elections, but he declined, preferring to spend his time writing and supervising the move to the new home. His income from mining and railroad investments was sufficient to sustain the family's lifestyle and to allow for the construction of a vacation cottage, "Stanwood" on Mount Desert Island, Maine, designed by Frank Furness. Blaine appeared before Congress in 1882 during an investigation into his War of the Pacific diplomacy, defending himself against allegations that he owned an interest in the Peruvian guano deposits being occupied by Chile, but otherwise stayed away from the Capitol. The publication of the first volume of Twenty Years in early 1884 added to Blaine's financial security and thrust him back into the political spotlight. As the 1884 campaign loomed, Blaine's name was being circulated once more as a potential nominee, and despite some reservations, he soon found himself back in the hunt for the presidency.

== 1884 presidential election ==
=== Nomination ===
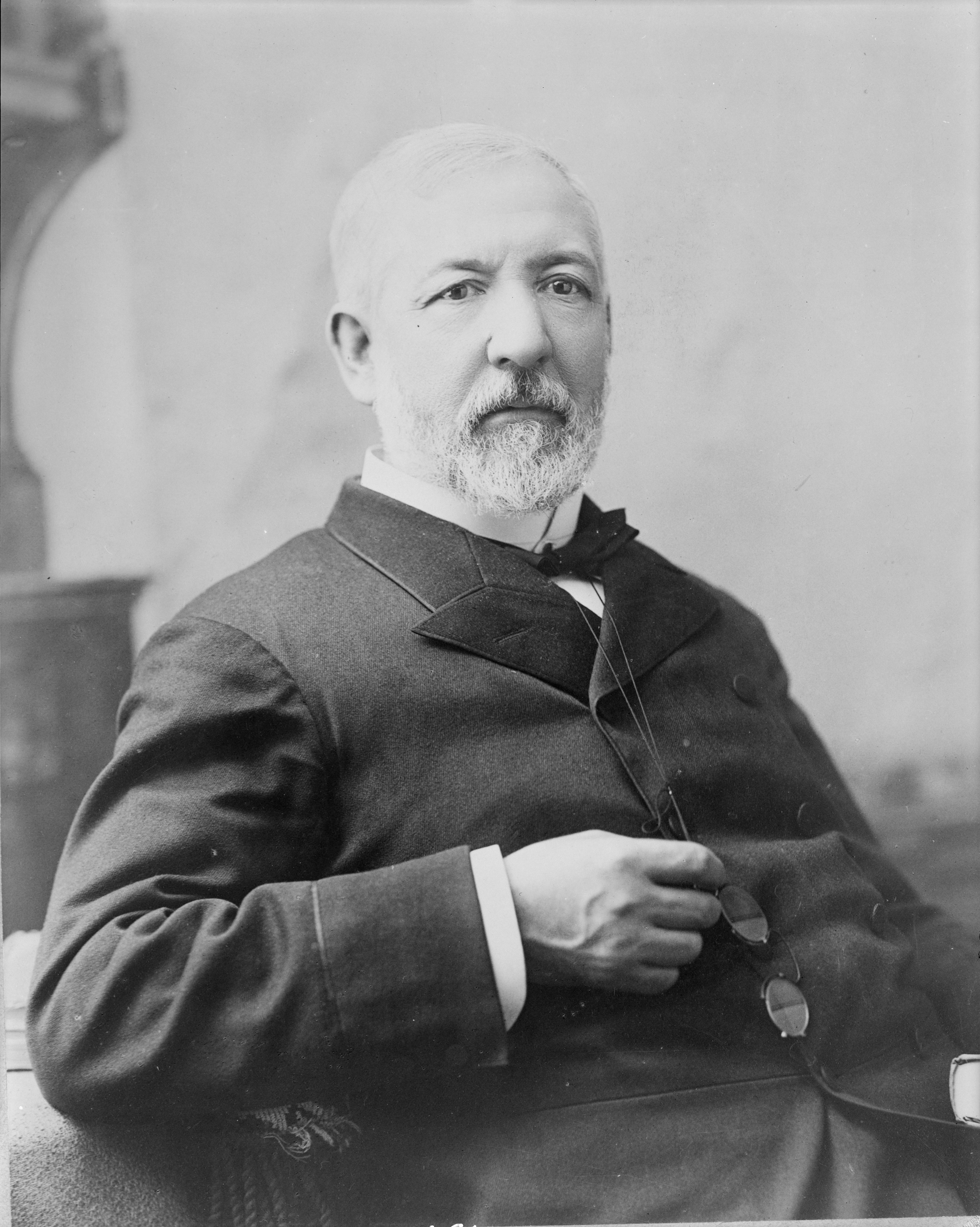
Blaine, c. 1884

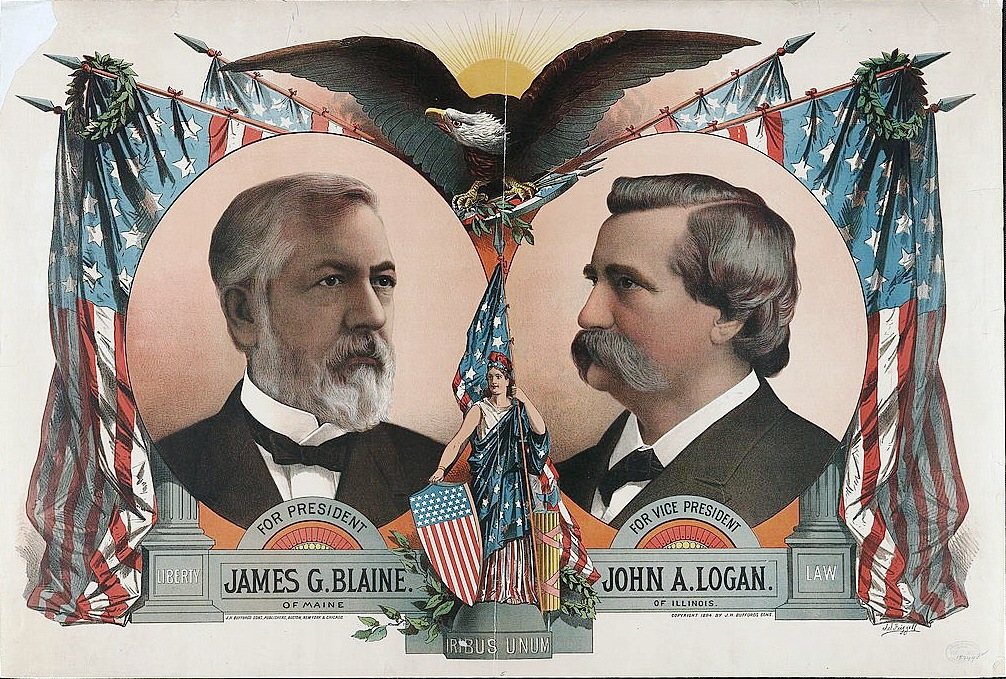
Blaine/Logan campaign poster

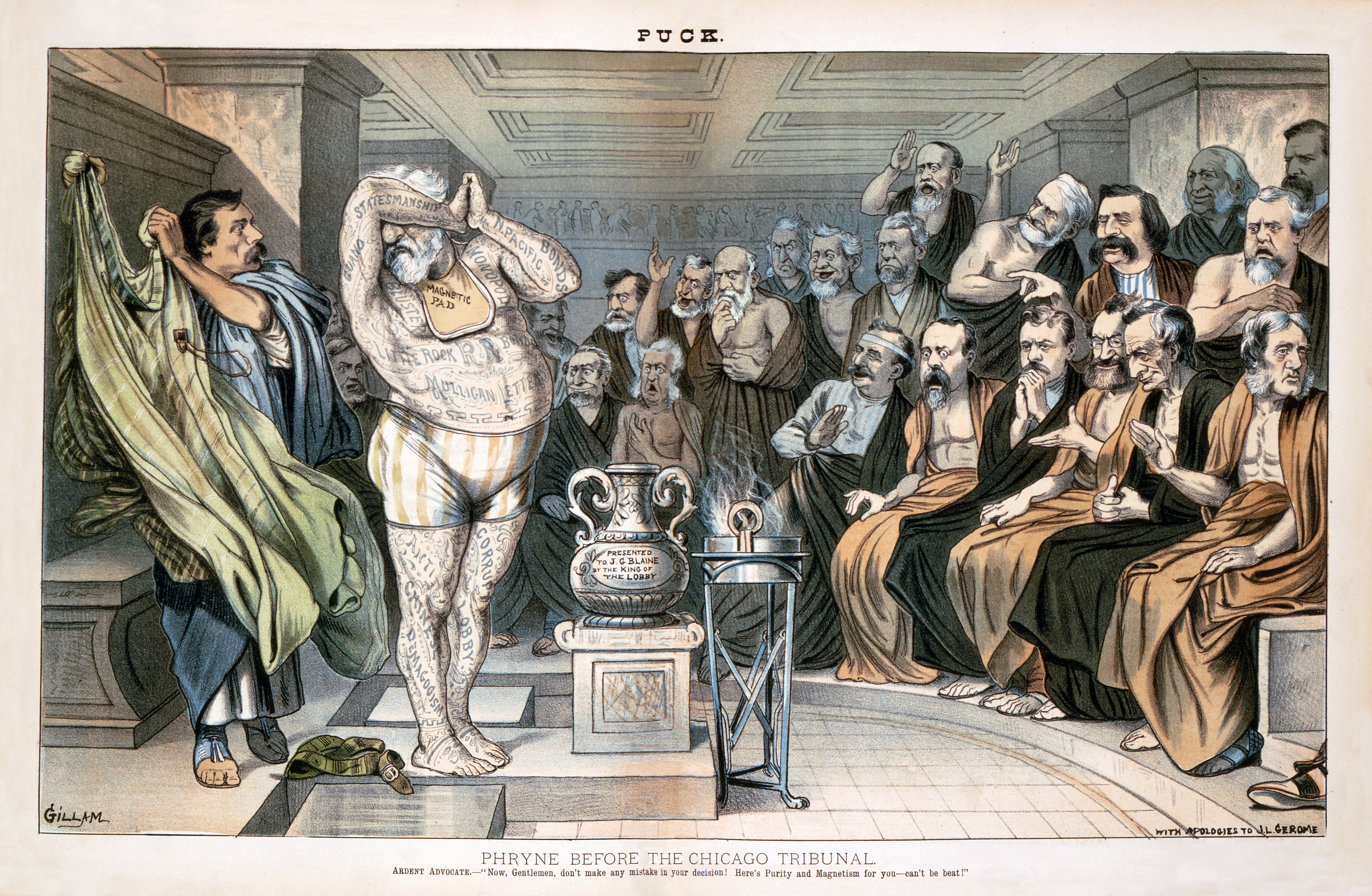
An 1884 cartoon by Bernhard Gillam in Puck ridicules Blaine as the tattooed-man with many indelible scandals. (Note: The cartoon is based on Phryne before the Areopagus, a painting by Jean-Léon Gérôme.)

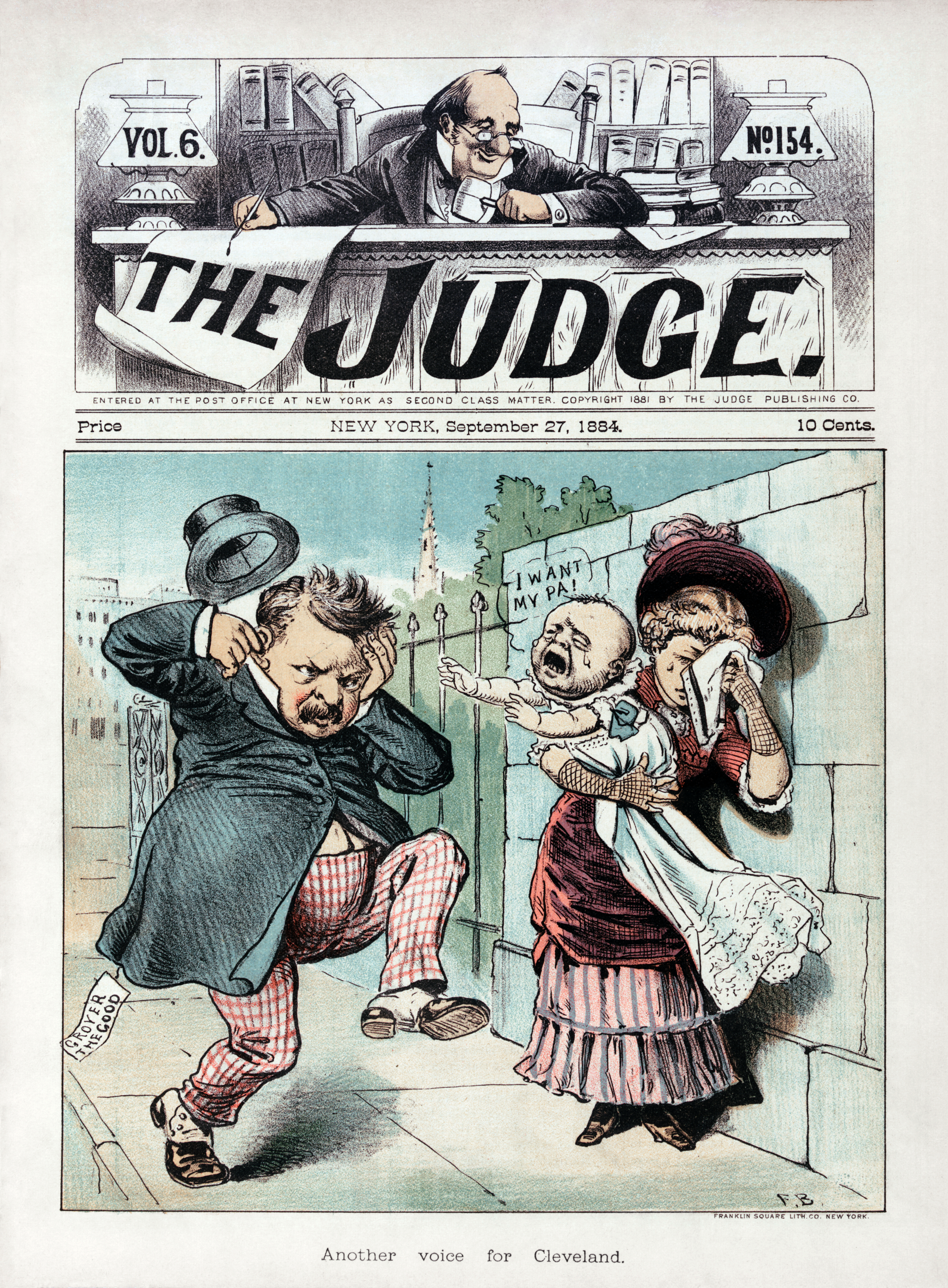
An 1884 anti-Cleveland cartoon from Judge highlights the Halpin scandal.

In the months leading up to the 1884 convention, Blaine was once more considered the favorite for the nomination, but President Arthur was contemplating a run for election in his own right. George Edmunds was again the favored candidate among reformers and John Sherman had a few delegates pledged to him, but neither was expected to command much support at the convention. John A. Logan of Illinois hoped to attract Stalwart votes if Arthur's campaign was unsuccessful. Blaine was unsure he wanted to try for the nomination for the third time and even encouraged General William T. Sherman, John Sherman's older brother, to accept it if it came to him, but ultimately Blaine agreed to be a candidate again.

William H. West of Ohio nominated Blaine with an enthusiastic speech and after the first ballot, Blaine led the count with 334½ votes. While short of the necessary 417 for nomination, Blaine had far more than any other candidate with Arthur in second place at 278 votes. Blaine was unacceptable to the Arthur delegates just as Blaine's own delegates would never vote for the president, so the contest was between the two for the delegates of the remaining candidates. Blaine's total steadily increased as Logan and Sherman withdrew in his favor and some of the Edmunds delegates defected to him. Unlike in previous conventions, the momentum for Blaine in 1884 would not be halted. On the fourth ballot, Blaine received 541 votes and was, at last, nominated. Logan was named vice presidential nominee on the first ballot, and the Republicans had their ticket.

=== Campaign against Cleveland ===
The Democrats held their convention in Chicago the following month and nominated Governor Grover Cleveland of New York. Cleveland's time on the national scene was brief, but Democrats hoped that his reputation as a reformer and an opponent of corruption would attract Republicans dissatisfied with Blaine and his reputation for scandal. They were correct, as reform-minded Republicans (called "Mugwumps") denounced Blaine as corrupt and flocked to Cleveland. The Mugwumps, including such men as Carl Schurz and Henry Ward Beecher, were more concerned with morality than with party, and felt Cleveland was a kindred soul who would promote civil service reform and fight for efficiency in government. However, even as the Democrats gained support from the Mugwumps, they lost some blue-collar workers to the Greenback Party, led by Benjamin F. Butler, Blaine's antagonist from their early days in the House.

The campaign focused on the candidates' personalities, as each candidate's supporters cast aspersions on their opponents. Cleveland's supporters rehashed the old allegations from the Mulligan letters that Blaine had corruptly influenced legislation in favor of railroads, later profiting on the sale of bonds he owned in both companies. Although the stories of Blaine's favors to the railroads had made the rounds eight years earlier, this time more of his correspondence was discovered, making his earlier denials less plausible. Blaine acknowledged that the letters were genuine, but denied that anything in them impugned his integrity or contradicted his earlier explanations. Nevertheless, what Blaine described as "stale slander" served to focus the public's attention negatively on his character. On some of the most damaging correspondence, Blaine had written "Burn this letter," giving Democrats the last line to their rallying cry: "Blaine, Blaine, James G. Blaine, the continental liar from the state of Maine, 'Burn this letter!'"

To counter Cleveland's image of superior morality, Republicans discovered reports that Cleveland had fathered an illegitimate child while he was a lawyer in Buffalo, New York, and chanted "Ma, Ma, where's my Pa?"—to which the Democrats, after Cleveland had been elected, appended, "Gone to the White House, Ha! Ha! Ha!" Cleveland admitted to paying child support in 1874 to Maria Crofts Halpin, the woman who claimed he fathered her child named Oscar Folsom Cleveland. Halpin was involved with several men at the time, including Cleveland's friend and law partner, Oscar Folsom, for whom the child was also named. Cleveland did not know which man was the father, and is believed to have assumed responsibility because he was the only bachelor among them. At the same time, Democratic operatives accused Blaine and his wife of not having been married when their eldest son, Stanwood, was born in 1851; this rumor was false, however, and caused little excitement in the campaign. (Note: The rumor arose because the Blaines had not filed a marriage license when they married in 1850. Licenses were not required in Kentucky until 1852.) Halpin disputed the claims of being involved with several men, accusing Cleveland of raping and impregnating her, then institutionalizing her against her will to gain control of their child.

Both candidates believed that the states of New York, New Jersey, Indiana, and Connecticut would determine the election. In New York, Blaine received less support than he anticipated when Arthur and Conkling, still powerful in the New York Republican party, failed to actively campaign for him. Blaine hoped that he would have more support from Irish Americans than Republicans typically did; while the Irish were mainly a Democratic constituency in the 19th century, Blaine's mother was Irish Catholic, and he believed his career-long opposition to the British government would resonate with the Irish. Blaine's hope for Irish defections to the Republican standard were dashed late in the campaign when one of his supporters, Samuel D. Burchard, gave a speech denouncing the Democrats as the party of "Rum, Romanism, and Rebellion." The Democrats spread the word of this insult in the days before the election, and Cleveland narrowly won all four of the swing states, including New York by just over one thousand votes. While the popular vote total was close, with Cleveland winning by just one-quarter of a percent, the electoral votes gave Cleveland a majority of 219–182.

== Party leader in exile ==
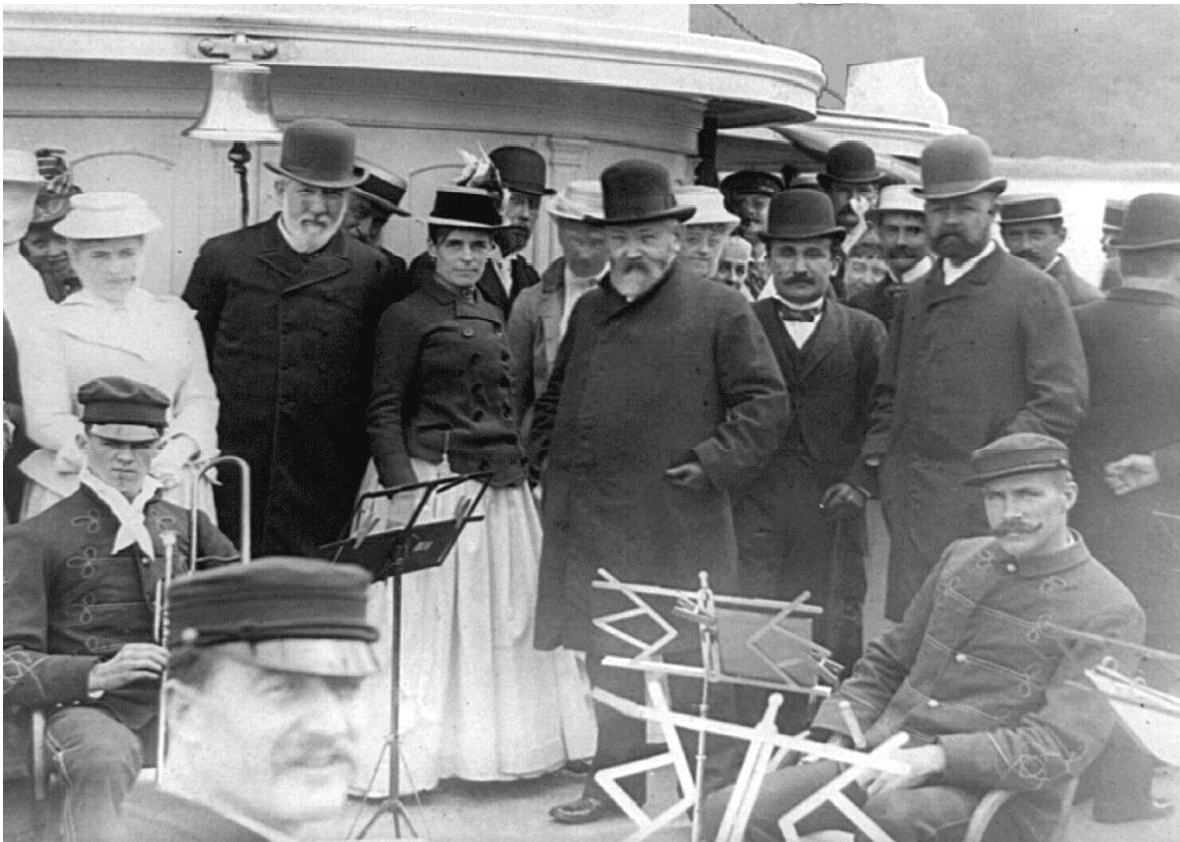
Blaine, Benjamin Harrison, and Henry Cabot Lodge and their families on vacation in Bar Harbor, Maine.

Blaine accepted his narrow defeat and spent most of the next year working on the second volume of Twenty Years of Congress. The book continued to earn him enough money to support his lavish household and pay off his debts. Although he spoke to friends of retiring from politics, Blaine still attended dinners and commented on the Cleveland administration's policies. By the time of the 1886 Congressional elections, Blaine was giving speeches and promoting Republican candidates, especially in his home state of Maine. Republicans were successful in Maine, and after the Maine elections in September, Blaine went on a speaking tour from Pennsylvania to Tennessee, hoping to boost the prospects of Republican candidates there. Republicans were less successful nationwide, gaining seats in the House while losing seats in the Senate, but Blaine's speeches kept him and his opinions in the spotlight.

Blaine and his wife and daughters sailed for Europe in June 1887, visiting England, Ireland, Germany, France, Austria-Hungary, and finally Scotland, where they stayed at the summer home of Andrew Carnegie. While in France, Blaine wrote a letter to the New-York Tribune criticizing Cleveland's plans to reduce the tariff, saying that free trade with Europe would impoverish American workers and farmers. The family returned to the United States in August 1887. His letter in the Tribune had raised his political profile even higher, and by 1888 Theodore Roosevelt and Henry Cabot Lodge, both former opponents, urged Blaine to run against Cleveland again. Opinion within the party was overwhelmingly in favor of renominating Blaine.

As the state conventions drew nearer, Blaine announced that he would not be a candidate. His supporters doubted his sincerity and continued to encourage him to run, but Blaine still demurred. Hoping to make his intentions clear, Blaine left the country and was staying with Carnegie in Scotland when the 1888 Republican National Convention began in Chicago. Carnegie encouraged Blaine to accept if the convention nominated him, but the delegates finally accepted Blaine's refusal. John Sherman was the most prominent candidate and sought to attract the Blaine supporters to his candidacy, but instead found them flocking to former senator Benjamin Harrison of Indiana after a telegram from Carnegie suggested that Blaine favored him. Blaine returned to the United States in August 1888 and visited Harrison at his home in October, where twenty-five thousand residents paraded in Blaine's honor. Harrison defeated Cleveland in a close election, and offered Blaine his former position as Secretary of State.

== Secretary of State, 1889–1892 ==
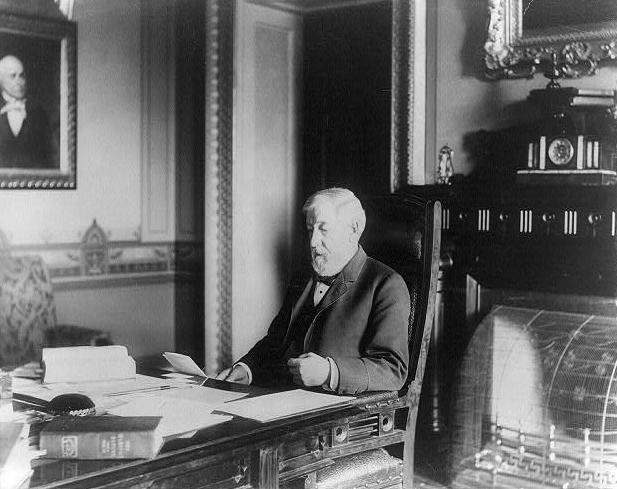
Blaine in his office, 1890

Harrison had developed his foreign policy based largely on Blaine's ideas, and at the start of his term, Harrison and Blaine had very similar views on the United States' place in the world. In spite of their shared worldview, however, the two men became personally unfriendly as the term went on. Harrison was conscious that his Secretary of State was more popular than he, and while he admired Blaine's gift for diplomacy, he grew displeased with Blaine's frequent absence from his post because of illness, and suspected that Blaine was angling for the presidential nomination in 1892. Harrison tried to limit how many "Blaine men" filled subordinate positions in the State Department and denied Blaine's request that his son, Walker, be appointed First Assistant Secretary, instead naming him Solicitor of the Department of State. Despite the growing personal rancor, the two men continued, with one exception, to agree on the foreign policy questions of the day.

=== Pacific diplomacy ===
Blaine and Harrison wished to see American power and trade expanded across the Pacific and were especially interested in securing rights to harbors in Pearl Harbor, Hawaii, and Pago Pago, Samoa. When Blaine entered office, the United States, Great Britain, and the German Empire were disputing their respective rights in Samoa. Thomas F. Bayard, Blaine's predecessor, had accepted an invitation to a three-party conference in Berlin aimed at resolving the dispute, and Blaine appointed American representatives to attend. The result was a treaty that created a condominium among the three powers, allowing all of them access to the harbor.

In Hawaii, Blaine worked to bind the kingdom more closely to the United States and to avoid its becoming a British protectorate. When the McKinley Tariff of 1890 eliminated the duty on sugar, Hawaiian sugar-growers looked for a way to retain their once-exclusive access to the American market. The Hawaiian minister to the United States, Henry A. P. Carter, tried to arrange for Hawaii to have complete trade reciprocity with the United States, but Blaine proposed instead that Hawaii become an American protectorate; Carter favored the idea, but the Hawaiian king, Kalākaua, rejected the infringement on his sovereignty. Blaine next procured the appointment of his former newspaper colleague John L. Stevens as minister to Hawaii. Stevens had long believed that the United States should annex Hawaii, and as minister he co-operated with Americans living in Hawaii in their efforts to bring about annexation. Their efforts ultimately culminated in a coup d'état against Kalākaua's successor, Liliuokalani, in 1893. Blaine's precise involvement is undocumented, but the results of Stevens' diplomacy were in accord with his ambitions for American power in the region. The new government petitioned the United States for annexation, but by that time Blaine was no longer in office.

=== Latin America and reciprocity ===
Soon after taking office, Blaine revived his old idea of an international conference of Western Hemisphere nations. The result was the First International Conference of American States, which met in Washington in 1890. Blaine and Harrison had high hopes for the conference, including proposals for a customs union, a pan-American railroad line, and an arbitration process to settle disputes among member nations. Their overall goal was to extend trade and political influence over the entire hemisphere; some of the other nations understood this and were wary of deepening ties with the United States to the exclusion of European powers. Blaine said publicly that his only interest was in "annexation of trade," not annexation of territory, but privately he wrote to Harrison of a desire for some territorial enlargement of the United States:

I think there are only three places that are of value enough to be taken ... One is Hawaii and the others are Cuba and Porto Rico [sic]. Cuba and Porto Rico are not now imminent and will not be for a generation. Hawaii may come up for decision at an unexpected hour and I hope we shall be prepared to decide it in the affirmative.

Congress was not as enthusiastic about a customs union as Blaine and Harrison were, but tariff reciprocity provisions were ultimately included in the McKinley Tariff that reduced duties on some inter-American trade. Otherwise, the conference achieved none of Blaine's goals in the short-term, but did lead to further communication and what would eventually become the Organization of American States.

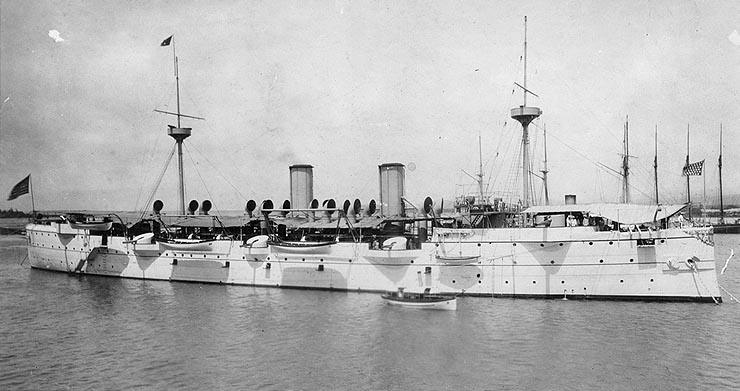
Sailors from the USS Baltimore caused the major foreign affairs crisis of Blaine's second term as Secretary of State.

In 1891, a diplomatic crisis arose in Chile that drove a wedge between Harrison and Blaine. The American minister to Chile, Patrick Egan, a political friend of Blaine's, granted asylum to Chileans who were seeking refuge from the Chilean Civil War. Chile was already suspicious of Blaine because of his War of the Pacific diplomacy ten years earlier, and this incident raised tensions even further. When sailors from the Baltimore took shore leave in Valparaíso, a fight broke out, resulting in the deaths of two American sailors and three dozen arrested. When the news reached Washington, Blaine was in Bar Harbor recuperating from a bout of ill health and Harrison himself drafted a demand for reparations. The Chilean foreign minister, Manuel Antonio Matta, replied that Harrison's message was "erroneous or deliberately incorrect" and said that the Chilean government was treating the affair the same as any other criminal matter. Tensions increased as Harrison threatened to break off diplomatic relations unless the United States received a suitable apology. Blaine returned to the capital and made conciliatory overtures to the Chilean government, offering to submit the dispute to arbitration and recall Egan. Harrison still insisted on an apology and submitted a special message to Congress about the threat of war. Chile issued an apology for the incident, and the threat of war subsided.

=== Relations with European powers ===
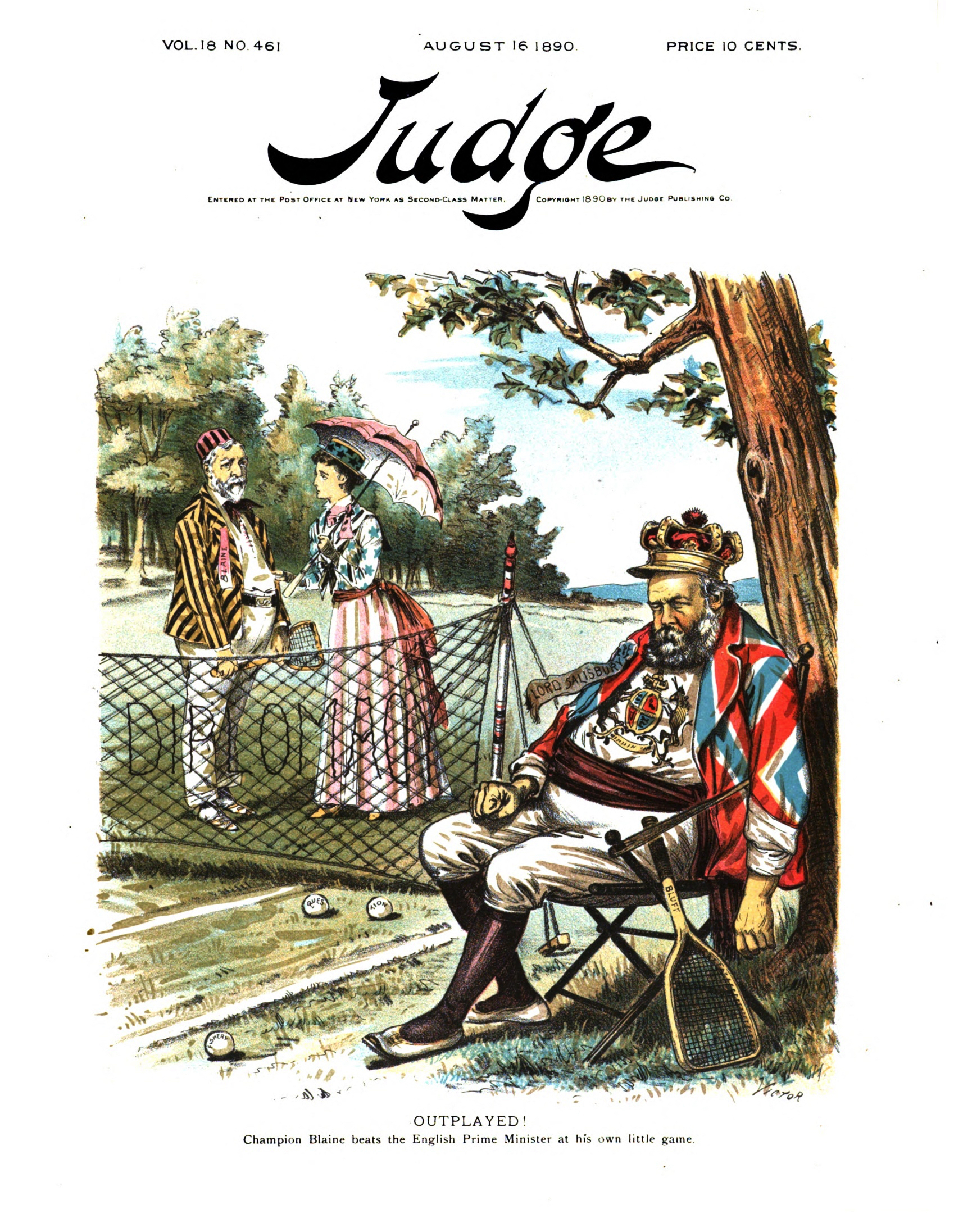
1890 political cartoon from Judge depicting Blaine "outplaying" British Prime Minister Robert Gascoyne-Cecil, 3rd Marquess of Salisbury.

Blaine's earliest expressions in the foreign policy sphere were those of a reactionary Anglophobe, but by the end of his career his relationship with the United Kingdom had become more moderate and nuanced. (Note: Some scholars have suggested that Blaine's Anglophobia was always more for political advantage than out of genuine sentiment.) A dispute over seal hunting in the waters off Alaska was the cause of Blaine's first interaction with Britain as Harrison's Secretary of State. A law passed in 1889 required Harrison to ban seal hunting in Alaskan waters, but Canadian fishermen believed they had the right to continue fishing there. Soon thereafter, the United States Navy seized several Canadian ships near the Pribilof Islands. Blaine entered into negotiations with Britain and the two nations agreed to submit the dispute to arbitration by a neutral tribunal. Blaine was no longer in office when the tribunal began its work, but the result was to allow the hunting once more, albeit with some regulation, and to require the United States to pay damages of $473,151. (Note: Equivalent to $15.6 million in 2025) Ultimately, the nations signed the North Pacific Fur Seal Convention of 1911, which outlawed open-water seal hunting.

At the same time as the Pribilof Islands dispute, an outbreak of mob violence in New Orleans became an international incident. After New Orleans police chief David Hennessy led a crackdown against local mafiosi, he was assassinated on October 14, 1890. After the alleged murderers were found not guilty on March 14, 1891, a mob stormed the jail and lynched eleven of them. Since many of those killed were Italian citizens the Italian minister, Saverio Fava, protested to Blaine. Blaine explained that federal officials could not control how state officials deal with criminal matters, and Fava announced that he would withdraw the legation back to Italy. Blaine and Harrison believed the Italians' response to be an overreaction, and did nothing. Tensions slowly cooled, and after nearly a year, the Italian minister returned to the United States to negotiate an indemnity. After some internal dispute—Blaine wanted conciliation with Italy, Harrison was reluctant to admit fault—the United States agreed to pay an indemnity of $25,000, (Note: Equivalent to $800,124 in 2025) and normal diplomatic relations resumed.

== Retirement and death ==
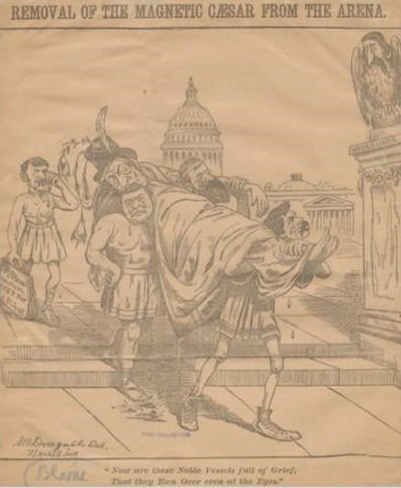
Political cartoon by Walt McDougall depicting the death and funeral of Blaine.

Blaine had always believed his health to be fragile, and by the time he joined Harrison's cabinet he truly was unwell. The years at the State Department also brought Blaine personal tragedy as two of his children, Walker and Alice, died suddenly in 1890. Another son, Emmons, died in 1892. With these family losses and his declining health, Blaine decided to retire and announced that he would resign from the cabinet on June 4, 1892. Because of their growing animosity, and because Blaine's resignation came three days before the 1892 Republican National Convention began, Harrison suspected that Blaine was preparing to run against him for the party's nomination for president.

Harrison was unpopular with the party and the country, and many of Blaine's old supporters encouraged him to run for the nomination. Blaine had denied any interest in the nomination months before his resignation, but some of his friends, including Senator Matthew Quay of Pennsylvania and James S. Clarkson, chairman of the Republican National Committee, took it for false modesty and worked for his nomination anyway. When Blaine resigned from the cabinet, his boosters were certain that he was a candidate, but the majority of the party stood by the incumbent. Harrison was renominated on the first ballot, but die-hard Blaine delegates still gave their champion 182 and 1/6 votes, good enough for second place.

Blaine spent the summer of 1892 at his Bar Harbor cottage, and did not involve himself in the presidential campaign other than to make a single speech in New York in October. Harrison was defeated soundly in his rematch against former president Cleveland and when Blaine returned to Washington at the close of 1892, he and Harrison were friendlier than they had been in years. Blaine's health declined rapidly in the winter of 1892–1893, and he died in his Washington home on January 27, 1893, four days before turning sixty-three. After a funeral at the Presbyterian Church of the Covenant, he was buried in Oak Hill Cemetery in Washington. He was later re-interred in Blaine Memorial Park, Augusta, Maine, in 1920.

== Legacy ==
Shortly after his passing, James G. Blaine Elementary School was built in 1895. It is located within the Lakeview neighborhood in Chicago, Illinois.

Blaine, Minnesota, a suburb of Minneapolis-St. Paul was named after him.

A towering figure in the Republican party of his day, Blaine fell into obscurity fairly soon after his death. A 1905 biography by his wife's cousin, Edward Stanwood, was written when the question was still in doubt, but by the time David Saville Muzzey published his biography of Blaine in 1934, the subtitle "A Political Idol of Other Days" already spoke to its subject's fading place in the popular mind, perhaps because of the nine men the Republican Party nominated for the presidency from 1860 to 1912, Blaine is the only one who never became president. Although several authors studied Blaine's foreign policy career, including Edward P. Crapol's 2000 work, Muzzey's was the last full-scale biography of the man until Neil Rolde's 2006 book. Historian R. Hal Williams was working on a new biography of Blaine, tentatively titled James G. Blaine: A Life in Politics, until his death in 2016.

During the 2016 United States presidential election, both Donald Trump and Hillary Clinton were compared to Blaine for their controversies. Blaine's status as a former Secretary of State who sought to erase evidence of his personal corruption drew parallels to Clinton, while his appeals to anti-Chinese sentiment were compared to Trump's anti-Muslim rhetoric. Similarly, the Mugwumps who opposed Blaine in 1884 have been compared to the Never Trump movement.

=== In media ===
Blaine was portrayed by Bradley Whitford in the 2025 miniseries Death by Lightning.

== Notes ==
U.S. House of Representatives
Preceded by Samuel C. Fessenden	Member of the U.S. House of Representatives from Maine's 3rd congressional district 1863–1876	Succeeded by Edwin Flye
Preceded by ???	Chair of the House Rules Committee; 1873–1876	Succeeded by J. Warren Keifer
Political offices
Preceded by Theodore Pomeroy	Speaker of the United States House of Representatives; 1869–1875	Succeeded by Michael C. Kerr
Preceded by William M. Evarts	United States Secretary of State; 1881	Succeeded by Frederick T. Frelinghuysen
Preceded by Thomas F. Bayard	United States Secretary of State; 1889–1892	Succeeded by John W. Foster
U.S. Senate
Preceded by Lot M. Morrill	U.S. Senator (Class 2) from Maine; 1876–1881; Served alongside: Hannibal Hamlin	Succeeded by William P. Frye
Preceded by Powell Clayton	Chair of the Senate Civil Service Committee; 1877	Succeeded by Henry Teller
Preceded by Thomas Ferry	Chair of the Senate Rules Committee; 1877–1879	Succeeded by John T. Morgan
Party political offices
Preceded by James A. Garfield	Republican nominee for President of the United States; 1884	Succeeded by Benjamin Harrison
