= Edward Stanwood =

American writer and historian

Edward Stanwood Sr. (September 16, 1841 – October 11, 1923) was a writer, journalist, historian, and editor from Maine.

He was born to Daniel Caldwell Stanwood (1811–1863) and Mary Augusta Webster Stanwood in Augusta, Maine. His father was a bookseller, militia member, city clerk, and state legislator. His father was a state representative in 1856.

Joseph Homan Manley was his classmate. Edward Stanwood lived in what became known as the Edward Stanwood House on High Street in Brookline, Massachusetts. Completed in 1879, the Queen Anne architecture style home was designed by Boston architect Clarence Sumner Luce. Thomas Dewing worked on the interior design.

He graduated from Bowdoin College in 1861. He was married to Eliza Maxwell Topliff Stanwood November 16, 1870. She was the daughter of Samuel Tooliff. Their daughter Ethel Stanwood became a writer and artist. Her husband Charles Knowles Bolton wrote books including a history of Brookline titled The History of a Favored Town and was a librarian. Bolton's "Memoir of Edward Stanwood" was published in 1924.

He spent summers on Squirrel Island. Fred Demmler painted him. He was a member of Brookline's Whist Club and wrote a history of it. He aligned with the Democratic Party.

He updated his book A History of the Presidency and it was retitled and reprinted. He served as Senior Editor of Youth's Companion, a magazine for children. A letter he wrote survives. He served as secretary and treasurer of the Arkwright Club. He was a trustee of the Brookline library and served as an overseer of Bowdoin College and as a member of its board of trustees.

== Books ==
- Boston illustrated, J. R. Osgood (1873)
- American tariff controversies in the nineteenth century (1904)
- A History of the Presidency from 1897 to 1909
- A History of Presidential Elections
- James Gillespie Blaine in the American Statesman series
