= A. LeRoy Greason =

American academic administrator

A. Leroy Greason

12th President of Bowdoin College
- In office 1981–1990
- Preceded by: Willard F. Enteman
- Succeeded by: Robert H. Edwards

Personal details
- Born: September 13, 1922 Newport, Rhode Island
- Died: August 28, 2011 (aged 88) Brunswick, Maine
- Education: Wesleyan University; Harvard University

Arthur LeRoy Greason, Jr. (born September 13, 1922 - August 28, 2011) was the twelfth president of Bowdoin College in Brunswick, Maine, serving from 1981 to 1990.

== Early life and career ==
A native of Newport, Rhode Island, Greason graduated from Wesleyan University in 1944 as both a member of Phi Beta Kappa and the president of Wesleyan's student government. He subsequently attended Harvard University to earn his master's and doctorate degrees, and taught at both Wesleyan and Harvard.

Greason began his Bowdoin career in 1952 as an instructor in English, becoming a full professor in 1966 with a specialty in 18th-century English literature. Greason served as both dean of students and dean of the college before stepping down in 1975 to return to full-time teaching. Nevertheless, five years later, following the departure of President Willard F. Enteman, Greason was asked to serve as acting president. In the fall of 1981, he became the third faculty member at Bowdoin to become President of the College.

== Bowdoin College presidency ==
During Greason's presidency, the college expanded its full-time teaching faculty from 100 to 125 and launched and successfully completed a $56 million capital campaign, the Campaign for Bowdoin. Additionally, the college constructed the Farley Field House, the Bowdoin College Swimming Pool, and the Campus Mall, which transformed the cross-campus access road into a pedestrian-friendly mall with an open-air stage, in response to concerns about through-traffic and parking hazards along that route. Construction on the Hatch Science Library also began.

Greason's curricular achievements included reinstating the course distribution requirements Bowdoin had abolished in 1970, establishing its Department of Computer Science, and instituting its Arctic Studies, Asian Studies and Women's Studies programs. In 1987, Greason asked a special panel to decide whether fraternities should be abolished at Bowdoin. His successor, Robert Hazard Edwards, ultimately effected that change.

== Honors ==
Greason received honorary degrees from his alma mater, Wesleyan University, and from Bates College, Colby College, the University of New England, and the University of Maine at Presque Isle. After retiring from Bowdoin's presidency in 1990, the college "awarded him a Doctor of Humane Letters."

== Remembrance ==
Following Greason's death at age 88, Bowdoin College President Barry Mills remembered him as follows on Bowdoin's website: “During his 10-year presidency, he expanded and strengthened academic offerings, increased the size and diversity of the faculty, and established strong ties between the college, alumni and the community... His greatest gift was his ability to find common ground among disparate people and to inspire them to work together. Bowdoin is a stronger, more humane place because of his service.”

The Bowdoin College Swimming Pool was renamed the LeRoy Greason Pool in his memory. The pool has hosted NESCAC and NCAA Championship events, and Olympic swimmers have trained along its sixteen 25-yard deep-water lanes.

Preceded by Willard F. Enteman	President of Bowdoin College; 1981–1990	Succeeded by Robert H. Edwards
