= Willard F. Enteman =

11th President of Bowdoin College
- In office 1978–1980
- Preceded by: Roger Howell, Jr.
- Succeeded by: A. LeRoy Greason

Personal details
- Education: Williams College; Harvard Business School; Boston University

Willard Finley Enteman (born 1936) was the eleventh president of Bowdoin College in Brunswick, Maine.

== Career ==
Enteman attended the Pingry School, then graduated from the Hotchkiss School in 1955 before attending Williams College in Williamstown, Massachusetts. After graduating in 1959, he attended Harvard Business School, where he received an M.B.A., and earned a Ph.D. from Boston University. Before teaching at Bowdoin, Enteman taught at Wheaton College in Norton, Massachusetts, and was chair of the philosophy department at Union College in Schenectady, New York.

Enteman was president of Bowdoin from 1978 to 1980, by far the shortest tenure of any president to date. Soon after beginning his term, he appointed a committee that recommended that Bowdoin remove its ties with companies deeply involved with South Africa and set up scholarship funds for South African students. He also appointed a committee to investigate gender discrimination in fraternities for not allowing women to be full members. In the summer of 1980, the governing boards of the college appointed a committee to review his performance; on November 10, he resigned.

He went on to teach philosophy at Rhode Island College in Providence, Rhode Island, and has served on the board of the Senior Initiative. He has written books on free will, management, and retirement. Enteman retired in Providence. More recent Bowdoin students and faculty have cited his legacy in calls for disinvestment from companies involved in atrocities in Darfur and in fossil fuels.

Preceded by Roger Howell, Jr.	President of Bowdoin College; 1978–80	Succeeded by A. LeRoy Greason
