= Robert H. Edwards =

American academic administrator (1935–2025)

Robert Hazard Edwards

13th President of Bowdoin College
- In office 1990–2001
- Preceded by: A. LeRoy Greason
- Succeeded by: Barry Mills

7th President of Carleton College
- In office 1977–1986
- Preceded by: Howard R. Swearer
- Succeeded by: David Porter

Personal details
- Born: May 26, 1935 London, England
- Died: November 30, 2025 (aged 90) Newcastle, Maine, U.S.
- Education: Princeton University (A.B.); Cambridge University (B.A., M.A.); Harvard University (LL.B.)

Robert Hazard Edwards (May 26, 1935 – November 30, 2025) was an American educator who was the seventh president of Carleton College and the thirteenth president of Bowdoin College.

== Education and early career ==
Edwards was born on May 26, 1935. A graduate of Deerfield Academy, Edwards attended Princeton University and graduated magna cum laude with an A.B. in English in 1957 after completing a senior thesis titled "The Lesson of the Master." He also earned a B.A. and an M.A. at Cambridge University and an LL.B. from Harvard Law School. In 1961, after law school, he earned admission to the U.S. federal bar. For several years he worked for the U.S. State Department on matters related to African countries that had been colonies and were making the transition to independent nationhood. After leaving the U.S. government, he joined the Ford Foundation, where he worked from 1965 to 1977 in Pakistan and New York, heading the foundation's Middle East and Africa Office.

== Carleton College ==
In 1977 Edwards became president of Carleton College. As Carleton's president, he helped launch the "Science, Technology, and Public Policy" program and expanded and remodeled the school's library. While at Carleton, he was a respected leader who challenged the faculty and raised awareness throughout the community. When he left in 1986, he received an honorary doctorate of Humane Letters.

== Work for the Aga Khan ==
After leaving Carleton, Edwards returned to Pakistan, going to Karachi to join the Secretariat of His Highness the Aga Khan, heading the Department of Health, Education and Housing. He also served on the board of trustees of Aga Khan University from 1987 to 1990.

== Bowdoin College ==
In 1990, he became president of Bowdoin, where he significantly changed the college's governance and residential life. In 1995, he merged all board members from Trustees and Overseers into a single Board of Trustees. The next year, the Trustees voted to phase out fraternities, immediately terminating the recruitment of new members, and to abolish fraternities entirely by 2000. The college acquired all fraternity chapter houses by the summer of 2000, to be absorbed after renovation into the college's new residential house system.

Additionally, the sizes of both the faculty and student body were expanded, from 130.8 to 154.8, and from 1410 to 1600, respectively. In the midst of a $135 million capital campaign starting in 1994 and ending in 1998 (with $136 million), the college's campus and academic programs were dramatically expanded. During his tenure, many Academic buildings were constructed or renovated included Druckenmiller, Cleaveland and Searles Halls, Memorial Hall and Wish Theatres, Hawthorne Longfellow Library and the Coastal Studies Center. Additionally, several new residential halls, a new student union, a new fitness center, and a new dining complex were built and several new programs were established including the Educational Technology Center, the Learning and Teaching Center, the Off-Campus Studies office, and the Coastal Studies Program.

In 1999, Edwards became a member of the board of trustees of Aga Khan University again. He was elected to the American Academy of Arts and Sciences in 2000. He was succeeded as president of Bowdoin by Barry Mills in 2001.

Colby College awarded Edwards an honorary degree in 2001.

== Personal life and death ==
Edwards married Ellen Ramsay Turnbull in 1966. He died in Newcastle, Maine, on November 30, 2025, at the age of 90.

Preceded by A. LeRoy Greason	President of Bowdoin College; 1990–2001	Succeeded by Barry Mills
