= Clayton Rose =

American acadrmic

15th President of Bowdoin College
- In office July 1, 2015 – July 1, 2023
- Preceded by: Barry Mills
- Succeeded by: Safa Zaki

Personal details
- Born: August 22, 1958 (age 67) San Rafael, California, U.S.
- Spouse: Julianne Rose
- Children: 2
- Education: University of Chicago (BA, MBA); University of Pennsylvania (MA, PhD)

Clayton Stuart Rose is an American academic administrator who served as the 15th president of Bowdoin College in Brunswick, Maine.

== Early life and education ==
Originally from San Rafael, California, Rose graduated from the University of Chicago with a bachelor's degree in 1980 and with a Master of Business Administration in 1981. In 2003, following a 20-year leadership and management career in finance, he enrolled in the doctoral program in sociology at the University of Pennsylvania to study issues of race in America, earning his master's degree in 2005 and his PhD with distinction in 2007.

== Career ==
Rose worked as a professor at Harvard Business School from 2007 until his appointment at Bowdoin. Rose officially succeeded Barry Mills as president of Bowdoin on July 1, 2015. In April of 2022 Rose announced that he would be stepping down from his position after the conclusion of the 2023 academic year.

Preceded by Barry Mills	President of Bowdoin College; 2015–2023	Succeeded by Safa Zaki
