= Safa Zaki =

College president

16th President of Bowdoin College
- Incumbent
- Assumed office July 1, 2023
- Preceded by: Clayton Rose

Personal details
- Born: Cairo, Egypt
- Spouse: Huff Templeton
- Children: 2
- Education: American University in Cairo (BA); Arizona State University (MA, PhD)

Safa Zaki is an Egyptian-American psychologist and academic administrator serving as the 16th president of Bowdoin College in Brunswick, Maine. She is the first woman to lead Bowdoin since its founding in 1794. Prior to her work at Bowdoin, Zaki served as dean of faculty at Williams College.

== Early life and education ==
Zaki was born in 1968 in Cairo, Egypt, and raised in Tanzania, Syria, Jordan, and Trinidad and Tobago. Zaki graduated from the American University in Cairo with a B.A. in psychology. She continued her education in the United States at Arizona State University, earning her master's degree and Ph.D. in psychology.

== Career ==
Prior to her appointment at Bowdoin, Zaki served on the faculty of Williams College for 22 years. She joined the Williams faculty in 2002 as an assistant professor of psychology. She was appointed the dean of faculty at Williams in 2020.

Zaki was elected President of Bowdoin College on March 9, 2023 and began her term on July 1, 2023. She was officially inaugurated on Saturday, October 14, 2023.

== Personal life ==
In 1995, Zaki married Huff Templeton, a fellow graduate student at Arizona State.

Preceded by Clayton Rose	President of Bowdoin College; 2023–	Succeeded by N/A
