= Richard E. Morgan =

American academic

- Born: May 17, 1937 Philipsburg, Pennsylvania
- Died: November 13, 2014 (aged 77) Harpswell, Maine
- Occupation: Constitutional theorist, professor of government and legal studies

Richard Ernest Morgan (May 17, 1937 – November 13, 2014) was a conservative author, contributing editor of City Journal, and the William Nelson Cromwell Professor of Government at Bowdoin College in Brunswick, Maine, United States. His areas of academic interest included the history, law and politics of the First Amendment. At the time of his death, Morgan was one of the leading conservatives of his generation.

== Works ==
Authored, co-authored or edited:

- The Politics of Religious Conflict
- The Supreme Court and Religion
- Domestic Intelligence: Monitoring Dissent in America
- American Politics: Direction of Change, Dynamics of Choice and People, Power and Politics
- Disabling America: The Rights Industry in Our Time
