= Barry Mills (college president) =

American academic administrator

Chancellor of UMass Boston
- Interim
- In office 1 July 2017 – 1 July 2018
- Preceded by: J. Keith Motley
- Succeeded by: Katherine Newman (interim)

14th President of Bowdoin College
- In office October 2001 – 1 July 2015
- Preceded by: Robert H. Edwards
- Succeeded by: Clayton Rose

Personal details
- Born: September 8, 1950 (age 75) Warwick, Rhode Island, U.S.
- Spouse: Karen Mills
- Children: 3
- Education: Bowdoin College (BS); Syracuse University (PhD); Columbia University (JD)

Barry Mills (born September 8, 1950) is an American lawyer who was the fourteenth president of Bowdoin College.

== Early life and education ==
A native of Warwick, Rhode Island, Mills graduated cum laude with a double major in biochemistry and government from Bowdoin College in 1972. He then went on to earn a Ph.D. in biology at Syracuse University in 1976 and a J.D. from Columbia University in 1979, where he was a Harlan Fiske Stone Scholar. Upon graduating, he soon began working at the law firm, Debevoise & Plimpton, where he became a partner in 1986.

== Career ==
A member of the Board of Trustees from 1994 through 2000, Mills became president of Bowdoin College in October 2001. Since then, Mills has dramatically changed Bowdoin's curriculum and campus. As part of a master plan first designed by Skidmore, Owings & Merrill in 2004, the college has built new residential dorms, a recital hall, a hockey arena, a fitness center, converted one of the college's pools into an architecturally distinctive recital hall, and has undergone a highly publicized renovation to the Bowdoin College Museum of Art.

In 2011, Bowdoin set a record low rate of admissions for the class of 2015 at 15.7%. Three years earlier, in 2008, it was recognized as "School of the Year" by College Prowler. Additionally, that January, Mills announced that all student loans would be replaced by grants beginning in September.

Mills presented the Bowdoin Campaign in 2006, a $250 million fund-raising campaign set to be finished in June 2009 and focusing on new faculty positions and financial aid. Aided by a $10 million gift by Subway Sandwiches co-founder Peter Buck, the goal was met that February. In response to the 2008 financial crisis, in September 2008, Mills announced that the college would slow down the rate of new capital projects and faculty positions but would retain job security at the college.

In April 2014, Mills announced he would "step down as president of the College ... at the conclusion of the 2014-15 academic year." He officially stepped down on July 1, 2015, and was succeeded by Clayton Rose.

In March 2017, Mills was appointed deputy chancellor and chief operating officer at the University of Massachusetts Boston. In that role, he oversaw the academic and research program and campus operations. He stepped down from the role at the end of the 2017-18 academic year.

== Personal life ==
On December 19, 2008, his wife, Karen Mills, was nominated by President Barack Obama to serve in his administration as Administrator of the Small Business Administration, in which role she served until February 11, 2013.

| Preceded by Robert H. Edwards | President of Bowdoin College | Succeeded by Clayton Rose |
