= Bowdoin College =

Private college in Brunswick, Maine, US

- Motto: Ut Aquila Versus Coelum (Latin)
- Motto in English: "As an eagle towards the sky"
- Type: Private liberal arts college
- Established: June 24, 1794 (232 years ago)
- Accreditation: NECHE
- Academic affiliations: Annapolis Group; CBBC; CLAC; COFHE; Oberlin Group; Space-grant
- Endowment: $2.92 billion (2025)
- President: Safa Zaki
- Faculty: 211
- Undergraduates: 1,841 students on campus and 186 off campus (fall 2025)
- Location: Brunswick, Maine, United States; 43°54′31″N 69°57′46″W
- Campus: Suburban, 207 acres (84 ha)
- Newspaper: The Bowdoin Orient
- Colors: Black and white
- Nickname: Polar Bears
- Sporting affiliations: NCAA Division III –: NESCAC; NEISA; EISA
- Mascot: Peary the Polar Bear
- Website: bowdoin.edu
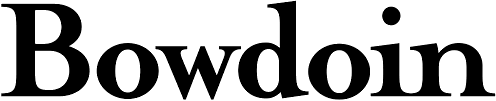

Bowdoin College (/ˈboʊdɪn/ BOH-din) is a private liberal arts college in Brunswick, Maine, United States. It was chartered in 1794.

In addition to its Brunswick campus, Bowdoin owns a 118-acre (48 ha) coastal studies center on Orr's Island and a 200-acre (81 ha) scientific field station on Kent Island in the Bay of Fundy.

The college was a founding member of its athletic conference, the New England Small College Athletic Conference, and the Colby-Bates-Bowdoin Consortium, an athletic conference and inter-library exchange with Bates College and Colby College. Bowdoin has over 30 varsity teams, and the school mascot was selected as a polar bear in 1913 to honor Robert Peary, a Bowdoin alumnus who claimed to have led the first successful expedition to the North Pole.

== History ==
=== Early years ===
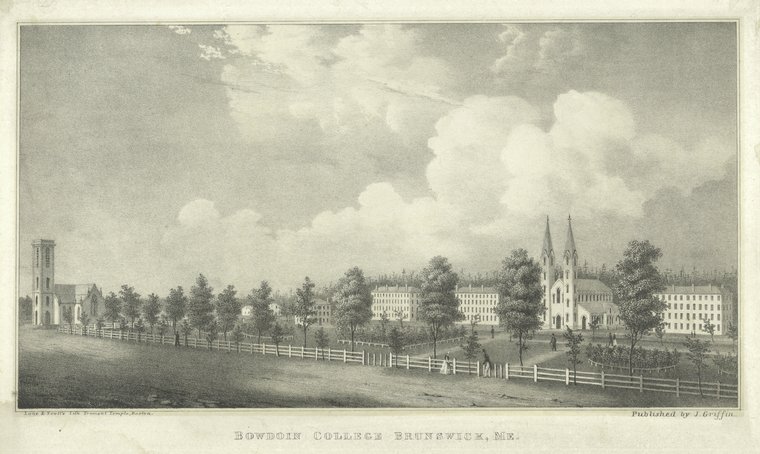
Bowdoin College, c. 1845 (Lithograph by Fitz Hugh Lane)

Bowdoin College was chartered in 1794 by the Massachusetts State Legislature and was later redirected under the jurisdiction of the Maine Legislature. It was named for former Massachusetts governor James Bowdoin, whose son James Bowdoin III was an early benefactor.

Bowdoin began to develop in the 1820s when Maine became an independent state following the Missouri Compromise. Future U.S. President Franklin Pierce attended the school, along with Nathaniel Hawthorne and Henry Wadsworth Longfellow, who graduated Phi Beta Kappa in 1825. Pierce and Hawthorne began an official militia company called the 'Bowdoin Cadets'. The Phi Beta Kappa Society was active at Bowdoin before the Civil War and featured anti-slavery speakers.

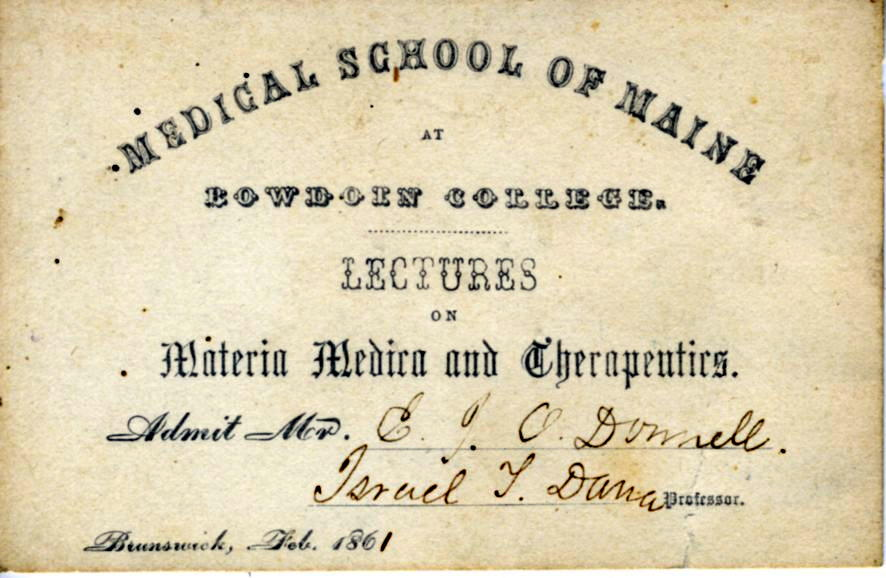
Bowdoin included the Medical School of Maine from 1821 to 1921

From its founding, Bowdoin was popular among the sons of the political elite and "catered very largely to the wealthy conservative from the state of Maine". During the first half of the 19th century, Bowdoin required of its students a certificate of "good moral character" as well as knowledge of Latin and Ancient Greek, geography, algebra, and the major works of Cicero, Xenophon, Virgil and Homer.

Harriet Beecher Stowe started writing her anti-slavery novel, Uncle Tom's Cabin, in Brunswick while her husband was teaching at the college. Brigadier General (and Brevet Major General) Joshua Chamberlain, a Bowdoin alumnus and professor, was present at the surrender of the Army of Northern Virginia at Appomattox Court House in 1865. Chamberlain, a Medal of Honor recipient who later served as governor of Maine and president of Bowdoin, fought at Gettysburg, where he commanded the 20th Maine in defense of Little Round Top. Other notable Civil War-era alumni include Major General Oliver Otis Howard, class of 1850, who led the Freedmen's Bureau and later founded Howard University; Massachusetts Governor John Andrew, class of 1837, who was responsible for forming the 54th Massachusetts; and William P. Fessenden (1823) and Hugh McCulloch (1827), both of whom served as Secretary of the Treasury during the Lincoln Administration.

With strained relations over slavery between political parties, President Franklin Pierce appointed Jefferson Davis as his Secretary of War, and the college awarded the future President of the Confederacy an honorary degree. The Jefferson Davis Award was established in 1972 following a donation from the United Daughters of the Confederacy and was given to students excelling in legal studies. The award was discontinued in 2015, with the college president citing it as inappropriate because it honored someone "whose mission was to preserve and institutionalize slavery".

=== 20th century ===
Although Bowdoin's Medical School of Maine closed in 1921, it produced notable graduates, including Augustus Stinchfield, who received his M.D. in 1868 and became one of the co-founders of the Mayo Clinic in Rochester, Minnesota. In 1877, the college graduated Charles Morse, the American banker who established a near-monopoly of the ice business in New York, which contributed to the financial Panic of 1907.

Graduates include Arctic explorers Robert E. Peary, class of 1877, and Donald B. MacMillan, class of 1898. Peary named Bowdoin Fjord and Bowdoin Glacier after his alma mater. Peary led what he claimed was the first successful expedition to reach the North Pole in April 1909, and MacMillan, a member of Peary's crew, explored Greenland, Baffin Island, and Labrador in the schooner Bowdoin between 1908 and 1954.

Wallace H. White, Jr., class of 1899, served as Senate Minority Leader from 1944 to 1947 and Senate Majority Leader from 1947 to 1949. George J. Mitchell, class of 1954, served as Senate Majority Leader from 1989 to 1995 before assuming an active role in the Northern Ireland peace process.

In 1970, the college became one of a small number of liberal arts colleges to make the SAT optional in the admissions process. In 1971, after nearly 180 years as a men's college, Bowdoin admitted its first class of women. Also in 1971, Bowdoin became a founding member of the New England Small College Athletic Conference (NESCAC) and began competing in the Colby-Bates-Bowdoin Consortium with Bates College and Colby College. The consortium became both an athletic rivalry and an academic exchange program. On February 28, 1997, Bowdoin's Board of Trustees approved a plan to phase out fraternities on campus, replacing them with a system of college-owned social houses.

=== 21st century ===
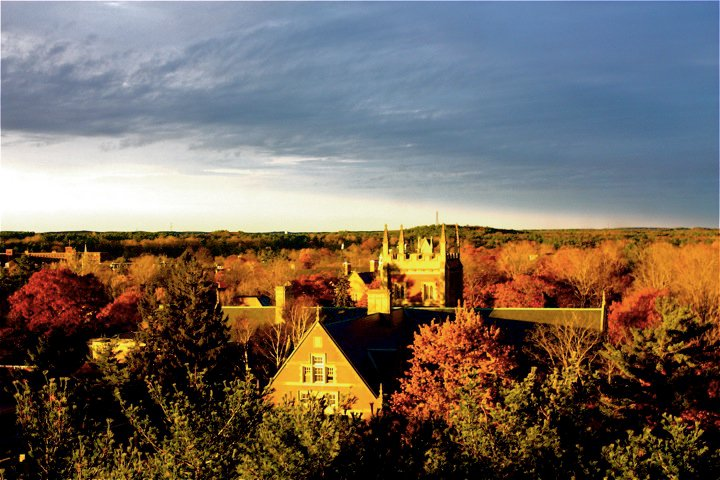
View of the campus from Coles Tower

On January 18, 2008, Bowdoin announced that it would eliminate loans for all students receiving financial aid, replacing those loans with grants beginning with the 2008–2009 academic year. President Barry Mills stated, "Some see a calling in such vital but often low-paying fields such as teaching or social work. With significant debt at graduation, some students will undoubtedly be forced to make career or education choices not based on their talents, interests, and promise in a particular field but rather on their capacity to repay student loans. As an institution devoted to the common good, Bowdoin must consider the fairness of such a result."

In February 2009, following a $10 million donation by Subway co-founder and alumnus Peter Buck, class of 1952, the college completed a $250 million capital campaign. The college also completed major construction projects on campus, including a renovation of the art museum and a new fitness center named after Peter Buck.

On July 1, 2015, Clayton Rose succeeded Mills as president. Eight years later, on July 1, 2023, Safa Zaki succeeded Rose as the first woman to serve as president of the college.

In February 2025, students occupied the Smith Union building to demand that the university divest from arms manufacturers, marking the first pro-Palestinian encampment during the second Trump administration. The encampment followed Trump's comments on occupying Gaza and perceived inaction following an Israel divestment referendum passed by the student body a year prior.

== Admissions ==
The acceptance rate for the class of 2030 was 6.5%.The college received more than 14,727 applications for the class of 2030 – the highest application number in the college's history and a continuation of the rise in applications over the past four years. Applications increased by about 50%, since the class of 2024 and about 100% since the class of 2021.

Admission Statistics
Class	Applicants	Admits	Selectivity	Matriculants	Yield	SAT scores
2030	14,727	962	6.5%	557	57.9%	TBD
2029	14,045	957	6.8%	515	53.8%	1460-1550
2028	13,265	946	7.1%	507	53.6%	1470–1550
2027	10,930	879	8.0%	504	57.3%	1480–1550
2026	9,376	862	9.2%	508	58.9%	1340–1540
2025	9,325	822	8.8%	517	62.9%	1320–1520

U.S. News & World Report classifies Bowdoin as "most selective". Of enrolling students, 89% are in the top 10% of their high school graduating class. Although Bowdoin does not require the SAT in admissions, all students may submit a score upon application. The middle 50% SAT range for the verbal and math sections of the SAT is 660–750 and 660–750, respectively—numbers of only those submitting scores during the admissions process. The middle 50% ACT range is 30–33.

The April 17, 2008, edition of The Economist noted Bowdoin in an article on university admissions: "So-called 'almost-Ivies' such as Bowdoin and Middlebury also saw record low admission rates this year (18% each). It is now as hard to get into Bowdoin, says the college's admissions director, as it was to get into Princeton in the 1970s." Many students apply for financial aid, and around 85% of those who apply to receive aid. Bowdoin is a need-blind and no-loans institution. While a significant portion of the student body hails from New England—including nearly 25% from Massachusetts and 10% from Maine—recent classes have drawn from an increasingly national and international pool. The median family income of Bowdoin students is $195,900, with 57% of students coming from the top 10% of highest-earning families and 17.5% from the bottom 60%. Although Bowdoin once had a reputation for homogeneity (both ethnically and socioeconomically), a diversity campaign has increased the percentage of students of color in recent classes to more than 31%. In fact, admission of minorities goes back at least as far as John Brown Russwurm 1826, Bowdoin's first Black college graduate and the third Black graduate of any American college.

== Academics ==
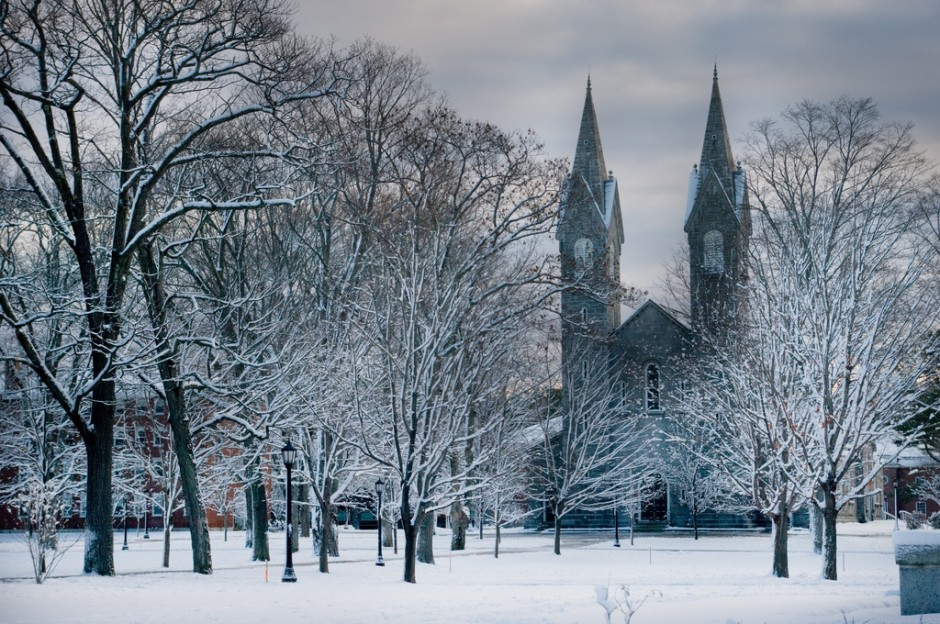
Bowdoin Chapel during the winter semester

Course distribution requirements were abolished in the 1970s but were reinstated by a faculty majority vote in 1981 due to an initiative by oral communication and film professor Barbara Kaster. She insisted that distribution requirements would ensure students a more well-rounded education in a diversity of fields and therefore present them with more career possibilities. The requirements of at least two courses in each of the categories of Natural Sciences/mathematics, social and behavioral sciences, humanities/Fine Arts, and foreign studies (including languages) took effect for the class of 1987 and have been gradually amended since then. Current requirements require one course each in natural sciences, quantitative reasoning, visual and performing arts, international perspectives, and difference, power, and inequity. A small writing-intensive course, called a first-year seminar, is also required. The most popular majors, by 2021 graduates, were:

Political Science and Government (82)
Econometrics and Quantitative Economics (61)
Biology/Biological Sciences (30)
Biochemistry (28)
Neuroscience (25)
English Language and Literature (25)
Mathematics (25)

In 1990, the Bowdoin faculty voted to change the four-level grading system to the traditional A, B, C, D, and F system. The previous system, consisting of high honors, honors, pass, and fail, was devised primarily to de-emphasize the importance of grades and to reduce competition. In 2002, the faculty decided to change the grading system to incorporate plus and minus grades. In 2006, Bowdoin was named a "Top Producer of Fulbright Awards for American Students" by the Institute of International Education.

Other notable Bowdoin faculty include (or have included): Edville Gerhardt Abbott, Charles Beitz, John Bisbee, Paul Chadbourne, Kenneth Chenault, Thomas Cornell, Kristen R. Ghodsee, Eddie Glaude, Joseph E. Johnson, Richard E. Morgan, Elliott Schwartz, and Scott Sehon.

=== Rankings ===
Academic rankings

Liberal arts
- U.S. News & World Report: 3
- Washington Monthly: 11

National
- Forbes: 24
- WSJ/College Pulse: 38

In the 2026 edition of the U.S. News & World Report rankings, Bowdoin was ranked tied at 3rd-best overall among liberal arts colleges in the United States. In previous U.S. News & World Report rankings, Bowdoin has tied at 6th for "Best Undergraduate Teaching", 7th in "Best Value Schools", and tied at 30th for "Most Innovative Schools".

In the 2026 Forbes college rankings, Bowdoin was ranked 24th overall among 500 universities, liberal arts colleges, and service academies and 2nd among private liberal arts colleges.

Bowdoin College is accredited by the New England Commission of Higher Education.

Bowdoin was ranked first among 1,204 small colleges in the U.S. by Niche in 2017, but has since fallen to 5th.

Based on students' SAT scores, Bowdoin is tied with Williams for 5th in Business Insider's smartest liberal arts colleges, with an average score of 1435 for math and critical reading combined. Among all colleges, it is tied with Brown, Carnegie Mellon, and Williams for 22nd.

The college was ranked 5th in the country by Washington Monthly in 2019 based on its contribution to the public good, as measured by social mobility, research, and promoting public service.

In 2006, Newsweek described Bowdoin as a "New Ivy", one of a number of liberal arts colleges and universities outside of the Ivy League, and it has also been dubbed a "Hidden Ivy".

== Student life ==
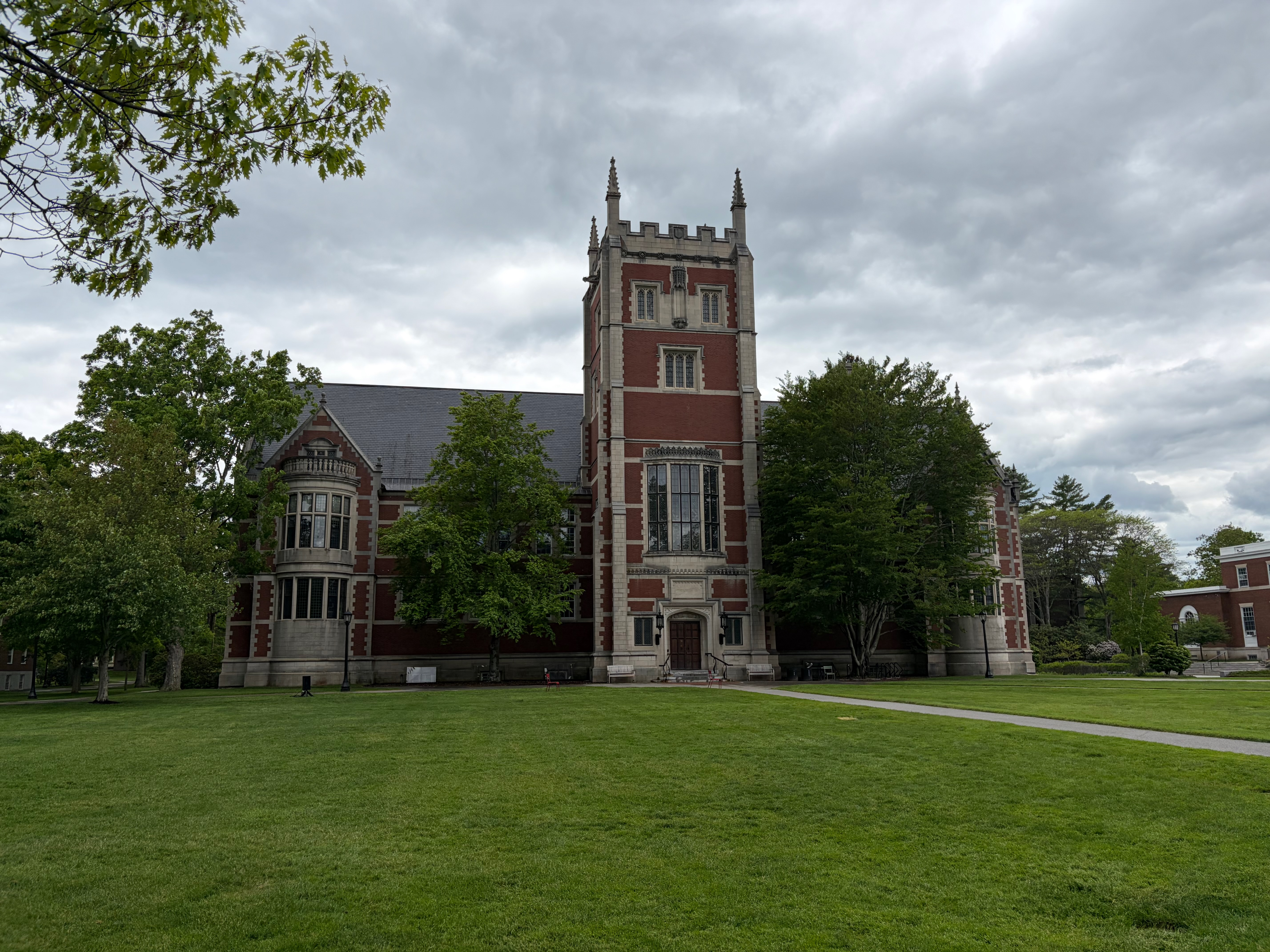
Hubbard Hall, once the college's library

Bowdoin's dining services have been ranked No. 1 among all universities and colleges nationally by Princeton Review in 2004, 2006, 2007, 2011, 2013, 2014, and 2016, with The New York Times reporting: "If it weren't for the trays, and for the fact that most diners are under 25, you'd think it was a restaurant."

Bowdoin uses food from its organic garden in its two major dining halls, and every academic year begins with a lobster bake outside Farley Fieldhouse.

Recalling his days at Bowdoin in a 2005 interview, Professor Richard E. Morgan (class of 1959) described student life at the then-all-male school as "monastic" and noted that "the only things to do were either work or drink". This is corroborated by the Official Preppy Handbook, which in 1980 ranked Bowdoin the number two drinking school in the country, behind Dartmouth. These days, Morgan observed, the college offers a far broader array of recreational opportunities: "If we could have looked forward in time to Bowdoin's standard of living today, we would have been astounded."

Since abolishing Greek fraternities in the late 1990s, Bowdoin has switched to a system in which entering students are assigned a "college house" affiliation correlating with their first-year dormitory. While six houses were originally established following the construction of two new dorms, two were added effective in the fall of 2007, and one added in the fall of 2019, bringing the current total to eight: Baxter, Quinby, MacMillan, Howell, Helmreich, Reed, Burnett, and Boody-Johnson. The college houses are physical buildings around campus that host parties and other events throughout the year. Those students who choose not to live in their affiliated house retain their affiliation and are considered members throughout their Bowdoin career.

=== Clubs ===
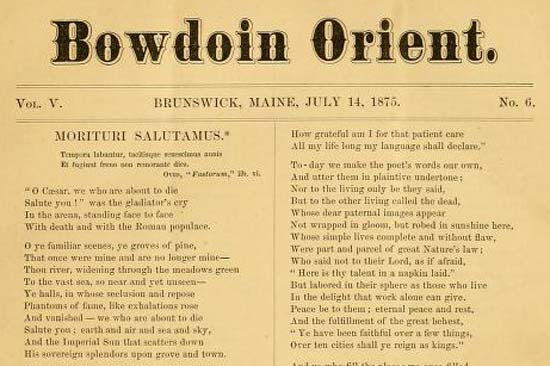
The Orient, the college newspaper

The largest student group on campus is the Outing Club, which leads canoeing, kayaking, rafting, camping, and backpacking trips throughout Maine. One of the school's two historic rival literary societies, The Peucinian Society, was refounded in 2007 after a century's long slumber. Founded in 1805 due to the minimal access to the College's library, originally housed in the oldest building on campus, Massachusetts Hall, Peucinian disbanned in the late 19th century after the rise of fraternities on campus. This organization counts such people as Henry Wadsworth Longfellow and Joshua Lawrence Chamberlain among its former members. The other, the now-defunct Athenian Society, included Nathaniel Hawthorne and Franklin Pierce as members.

Bowdoin competes in the Standard Platform League of RoboCup as the Northern Bites, where teams compete with five autonomous Aldebaran Nao robots. Bowdoin won the world championship in RoboCup 2007, beating Carnegie Mellon University, and finished 2nd in the 2015 US Open.

==== Media and publications ====
Bowdoin's student newspaper, The Bowdoin Orient, is the oldest continuously published college weekly in the United States. The Orient was named the second-best tabloid-sized college weekly at a Collegiate Associated Press conference in March 2007 and the best college newspaper in New England by the New England Society of News Editors in 2018.

The school's literary magazine, The Quill, was published between 1897 and 2015. The Bowdoin Globalist, an international news, culture, and politics magazine affiliated with the Global21 organization of college magazines, has been publishing since 2012. The Bowdoin Globalist transitioned to a digital-only platform in 2015 and changed its name to The Bowdoin Review. The college's radio station, WBOR, has been operating since the early 1940s. In 1999, The Bowdoin Cable Network was formed, producing a weekly newscast and several student-created shows per semester.

==== A cappella ====
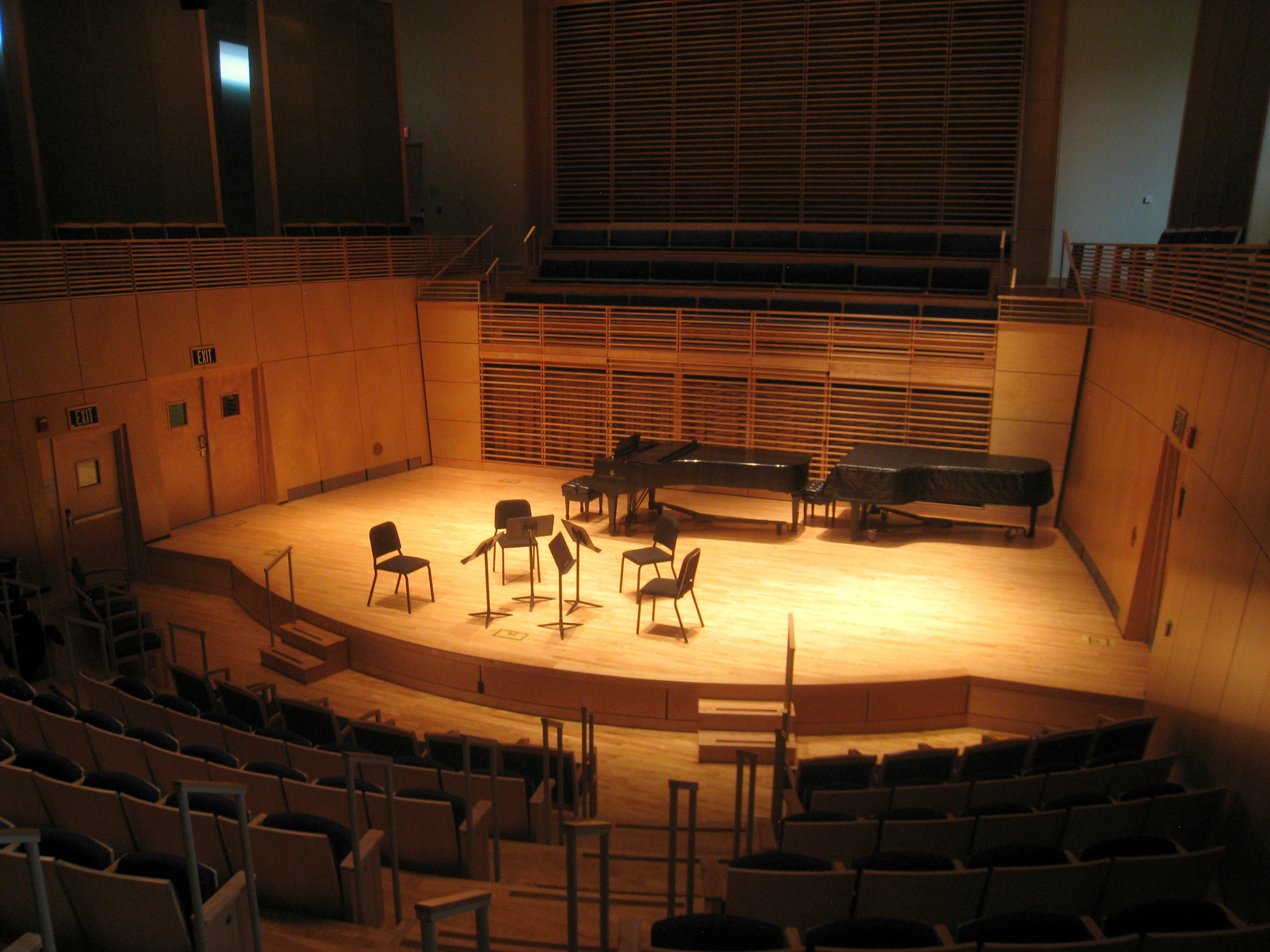
Studzinski Recital Hall

Six a cappella groups are on campus; the Meddiebempsters are the oldest. Founded in the spring of 1937, the Meddies performed in USO shows after World War II.

== Environmental record ==
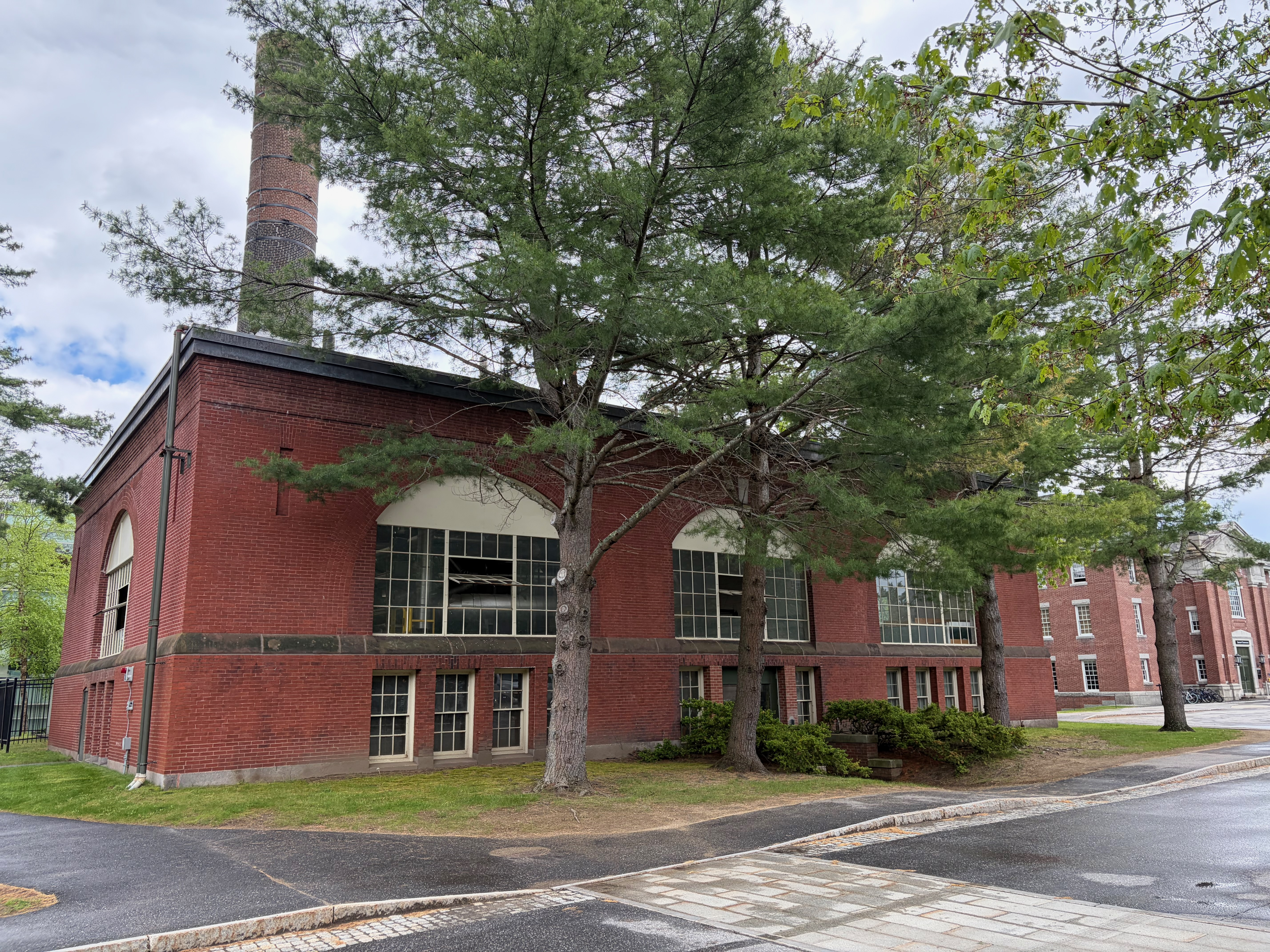
The college's heating plant

Bowdoin College signed on to the American College and University President's Climate Commitment in 2007. The college followed through with a carbon neutrality plan released in 2009, with 2020 as the target year for carbon neutrality. According to the plan, general improvements to Maine's electricity grid will account for 7% of carbon reductions, commuting improvements will account for 1%, and the purchase of renewable energy credits will account for 41%. The plan includes the construction of a solar thermal system, part of the "Thorne Solar Hot Water Project"; co-generation in the central heating plant (for which Bowdoin received $400,000 in federal grants); lighting upgrades to all campus buildings; and modern monitoring systems of energy usage on campus. In 2017, the college was on track to meet the 28% own source reduction target, and efforts have continued in the areas of energy conservation, efficiency upgrades and transitioning to lower carbon fuel sources. Bowdoin's facilities are heated by an on-campus heating plant that burns natural gas.

Between 2002 and 2008, Bowdoin College decreased its CO_{2} emissions by 40%. It achieved that reduction by switching from No. 6 to No. 2 oil in its heating plant, reducing the campus set heating point from 72 to 68 degrees, and by adhering to its own Green Design Standards in renovations. In addition, Bowdoin runs a single stream recycling program, and its dining services department has begun composting food waste and unbleached paper napkins. Bowdoin received an overall "B−" grade for its sustainability efforts on the College Sustainability Report Card 2009 published by the Sustainable Endowments Institute.

In 2003, Bowdoin committed to achieving LEED-certification for all new campus buildings. The college has since completed construction on Osher and West residency halls, the Peter Buck Center for Health & Fitness, the Sidney J. Watson Arena, 216 Maine Street, and 52 Harpswell all of which have attained LEED, Silver LEED or Gold LEED certification. The new dorms partially use collected rainwater as part of an advanced flushing system. The new Park Row Apartments and Schiller Coastal Studies Center are Passive House Certified through Phius.

== Campus ==
=== Brunswick main campus ===
Bowdoin College's main campus in Brunswick ranges over an area of 215 acres (87 ha) and includes 120 buildings, some of which date back to the 18th century. Prominent buildings on the campus include the college's oldest building, Massachusetts Hall, the Parker Cleaveland House, and the Harriet Beecher Stowe House. The campus has two museums: the Bowdoin College Museum of Art, in the Walker Art Building, and the Peary-MacMillan Arctic Museum, in the Gibbons Center for Arctic Studies.

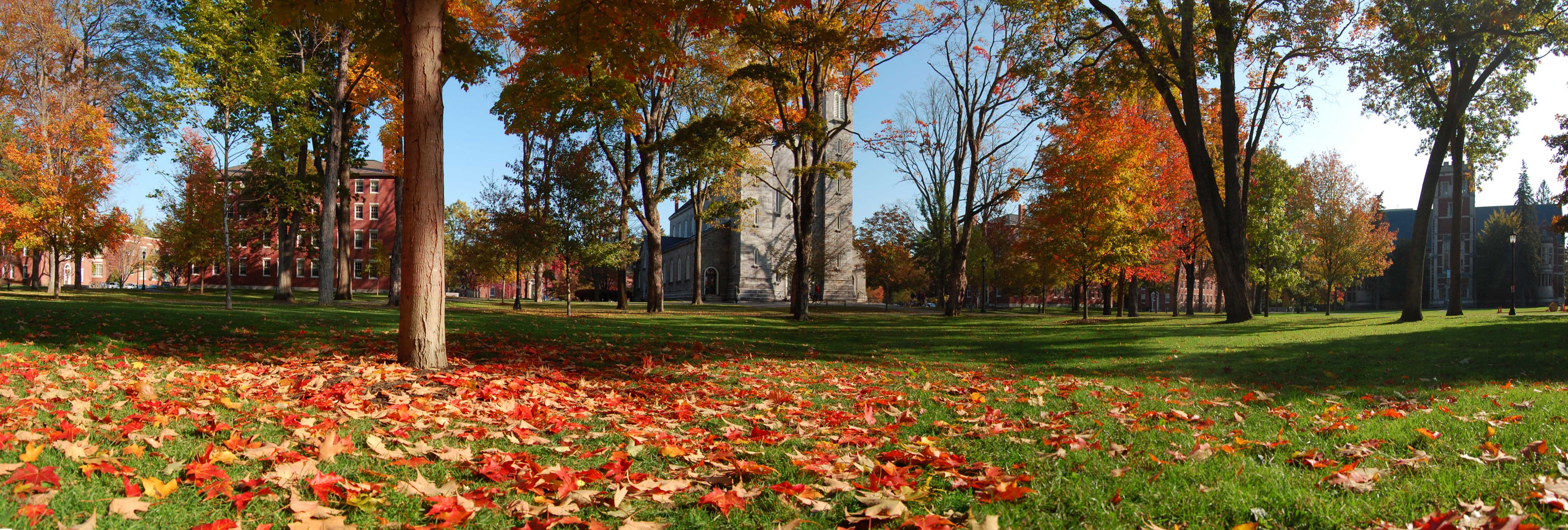
The main Quad of Bowdoin College in the middle of autumn

=== Other properties ===
The 118-acre (48 ha) Schiller Coastal Studies Center is located 8 miles (13 km) south of Orr's Island in Harpswell, Maine.

Bowdoin College operates the Bowdoin Scientific Station on Kent Island in the Bay of Fundy in New Brunswick.

== Athletics ==
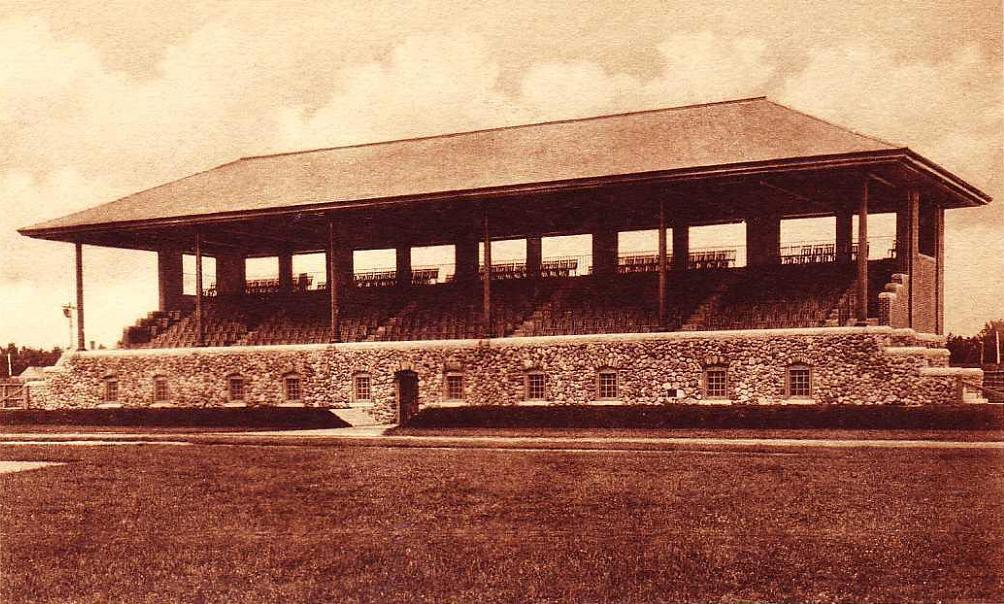
Hubbard Grandstand in 1912, built in 1904 at Whittier Field

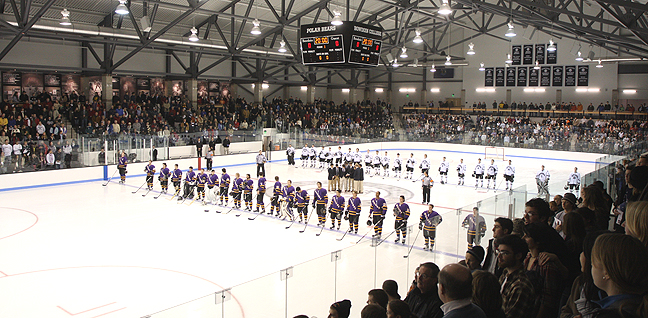
Before a match between Bowdoin and Williams at Watson Arena, built in 2009

Organized athletics at Bowdoin began in 1828 with a gymnastics program established by the "father of athletics in Maine", John Neal. In the proceeding years, Neal agitated for more programs, and himself taught bowling, boxing, and other sports.

Bowdoin College teams are known as the Polar Bears. They compete as a member of the National Collegiate Athletic Association (NCAA) Division III level, primarily competing in the New England Small College Athletic Conference (NESCAC), of which they were a founding member in 1971.

The mascot for all Bowdoin College athletic teams is the Polar bear, generally referred to in the plural, i.e., "The Polar Bears". The uniform color is white. The fight song, Forward The White, was composed by Kenneth A. Robinson, class of 1914.

The college's rowing club competes in the Colby-Bates-Bowdoin Chase Regatta annually. The rowing club also competes as a member of the American Collegiate Rowing Association; the women's team won its first national championship in 2023. The field hockey team are four-time NCAA Division III National Champions; winning the title in 2007 (defeating Middlebury College), 2008 (defeating Tufts University), 2010 (defeating Messiah College), and 2013 (defeating Salisbury University). The men's tennis team won the 2016 NCAA Division III Championship after defeating Emory University in Kalamazoo, Michigan.

Principal athletic facilities include Whittier Field (capacity: 9,000), Morrell Gymnasium (1,500), Sidney J. Watson Arena (2,300), Pickard Fields, and the Buck Center for Health and Wellness.

== Notable alumni ==
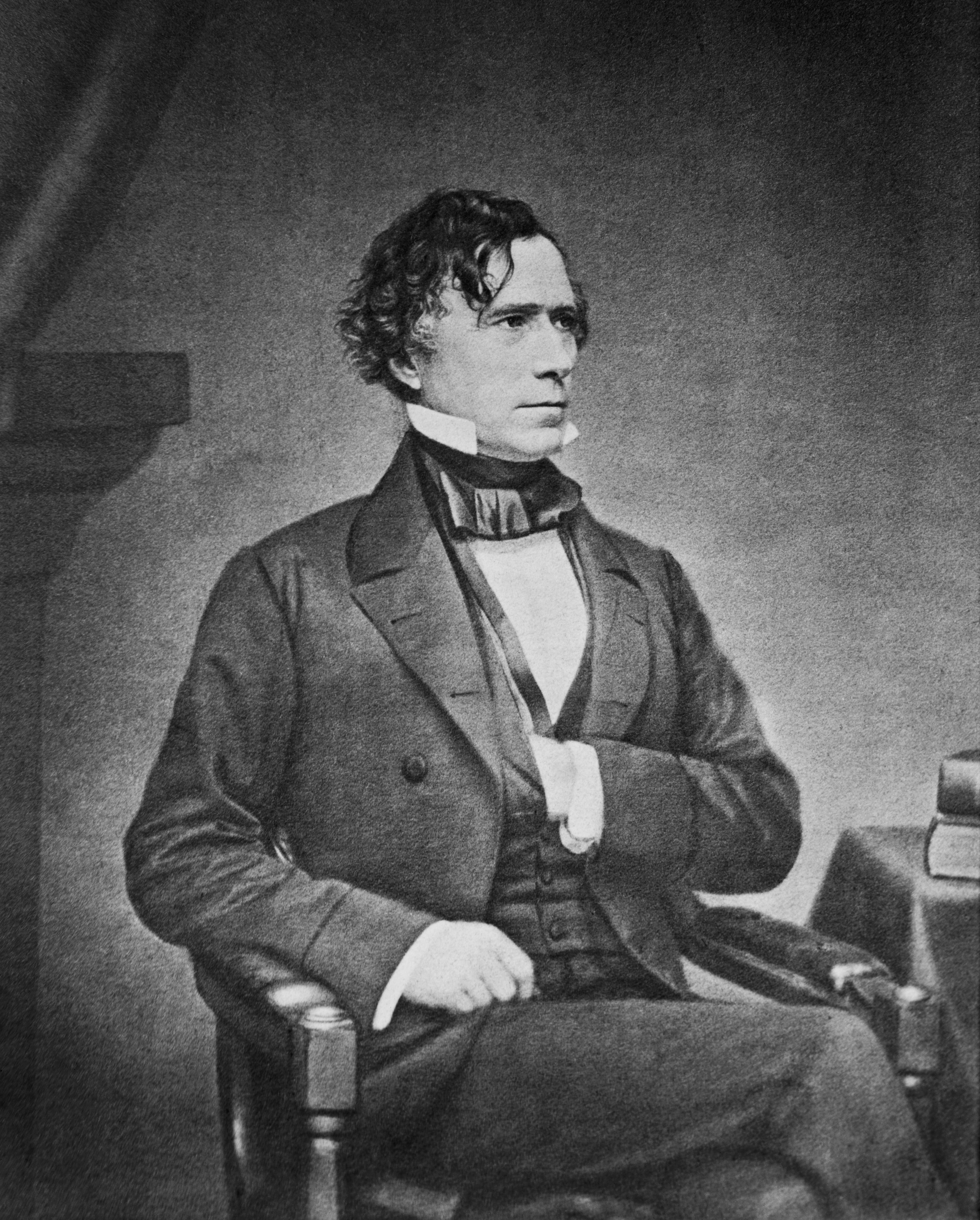
Franklin Pierce, 14th President of the United States

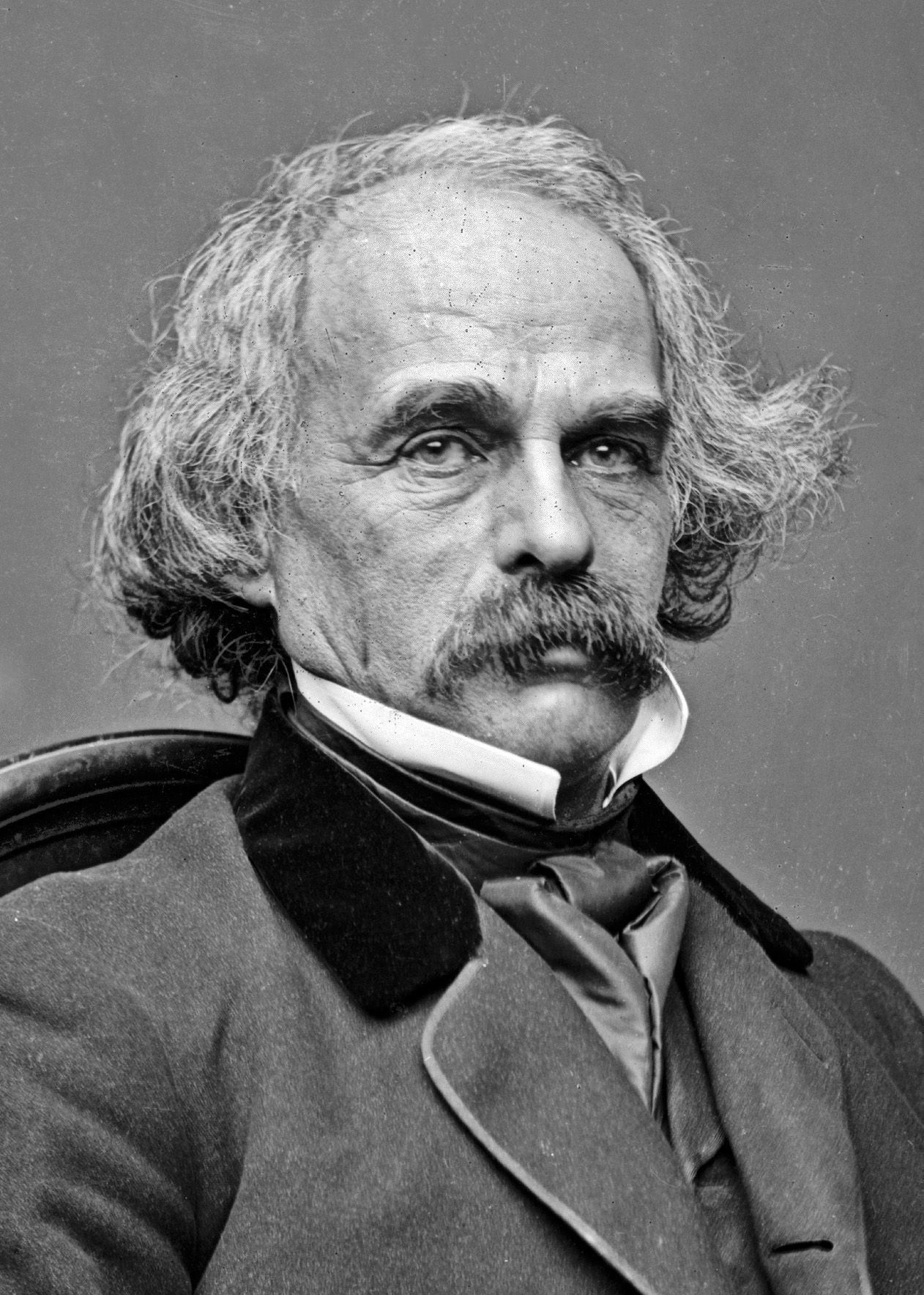
Nathaniel Hawthorne, novelist

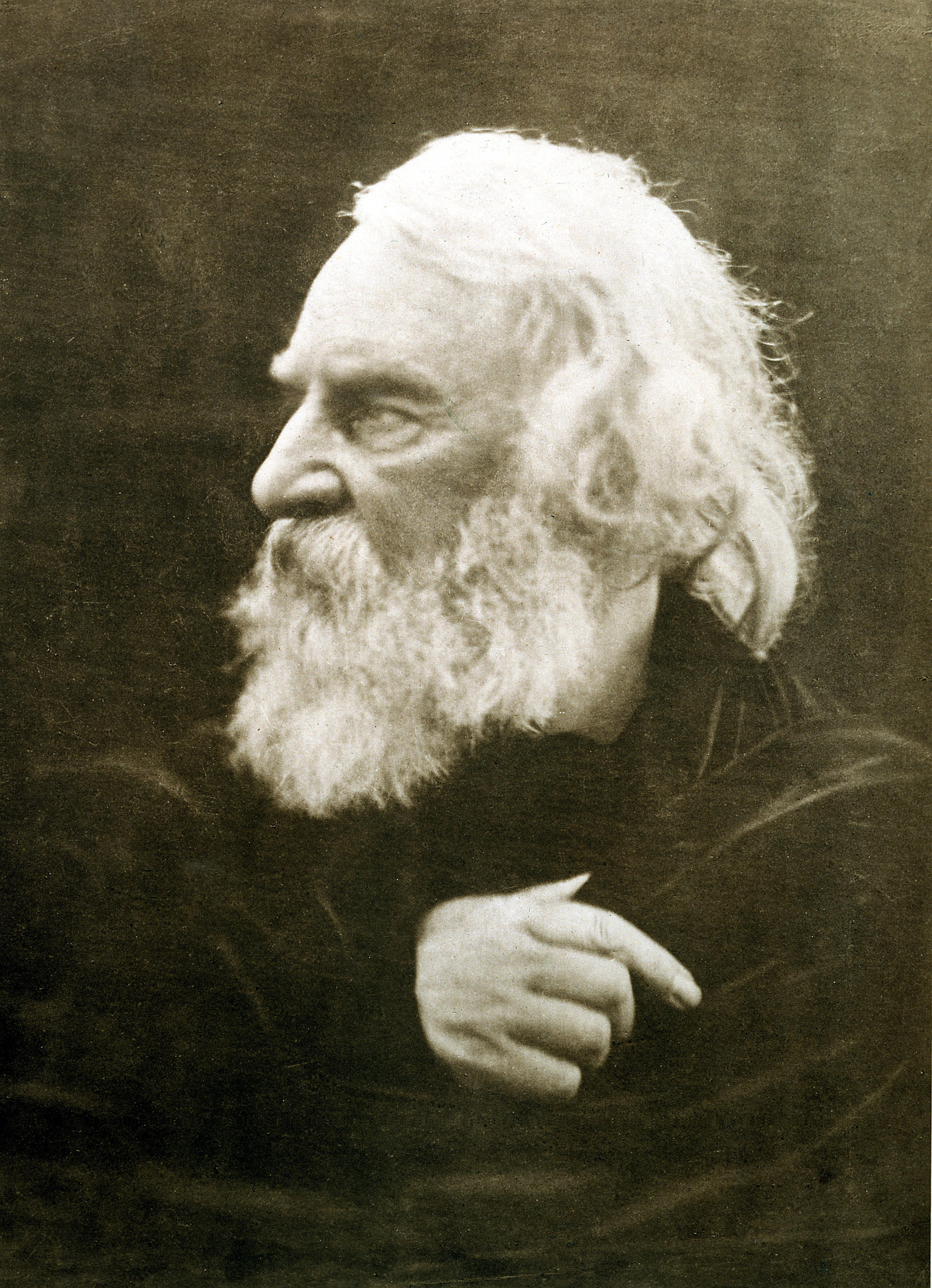
Henry Wadsworth Longfellow, poet

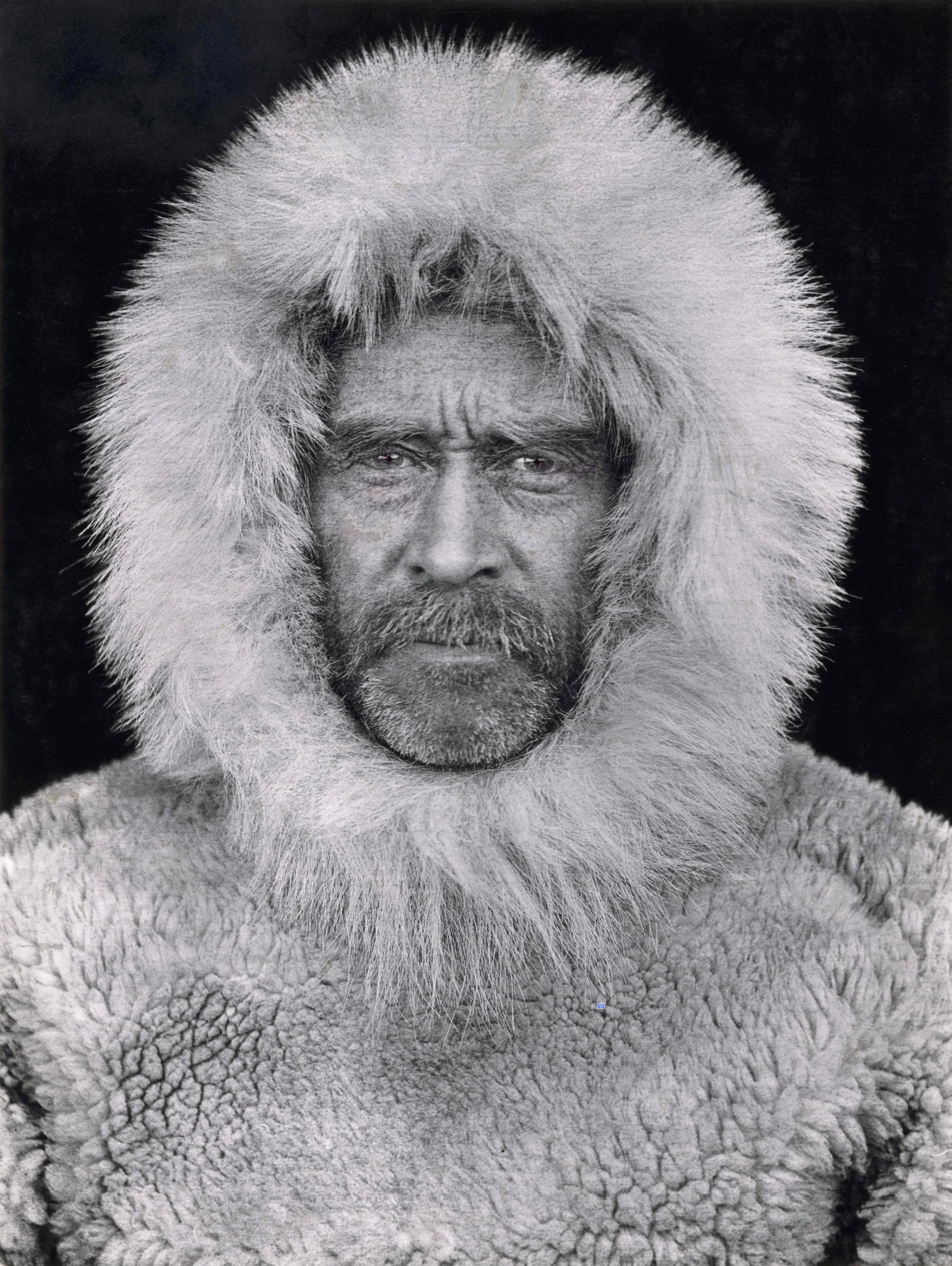
Robert Peary, explorer, who claimed to be the first person to reach the North Pole

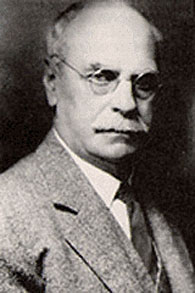
Edwin Hall, physicist who discovered the Hall effect

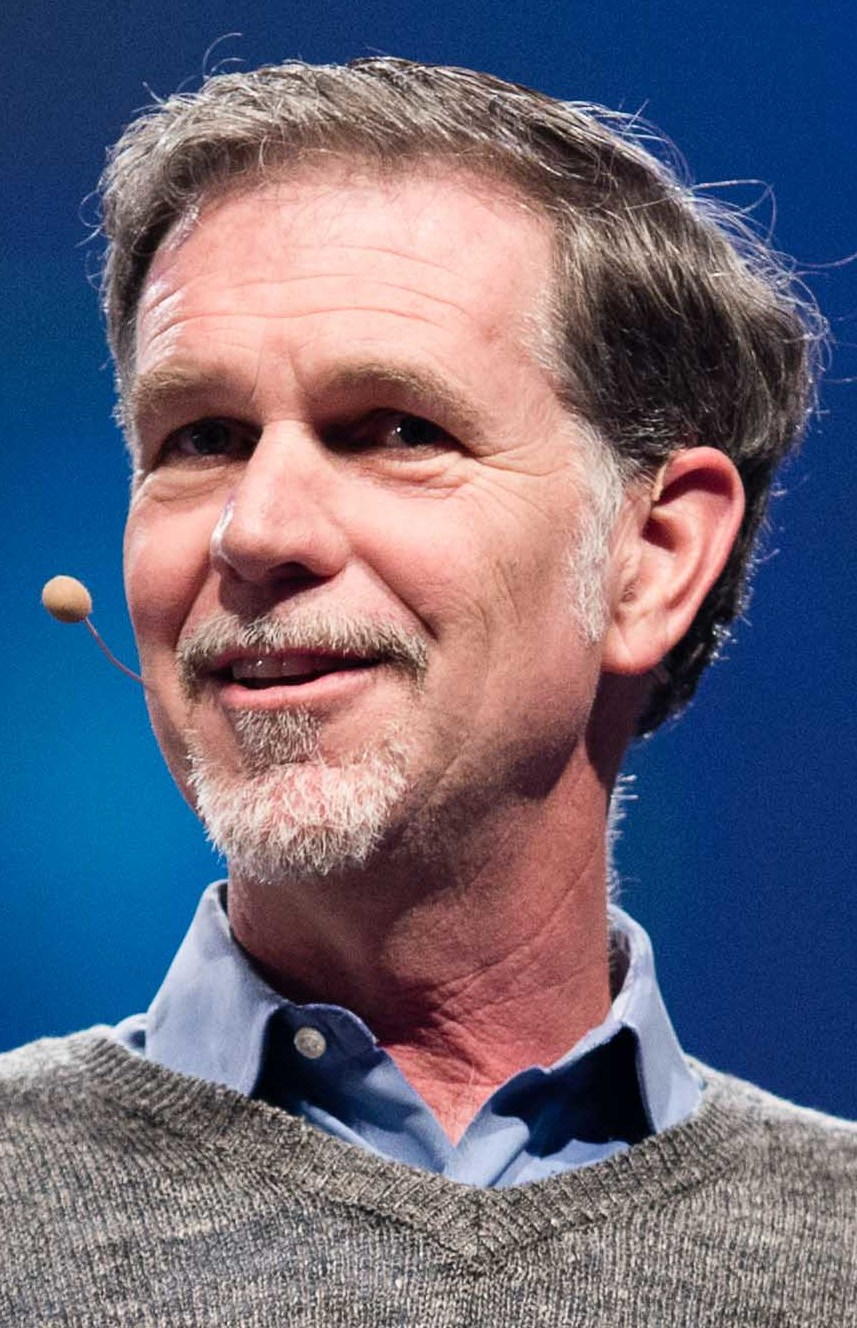
Reed Hastings, co-founder of Netflix

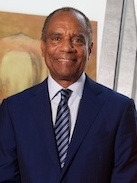
Kenneth Chenault, former chairman and CEO of American Express

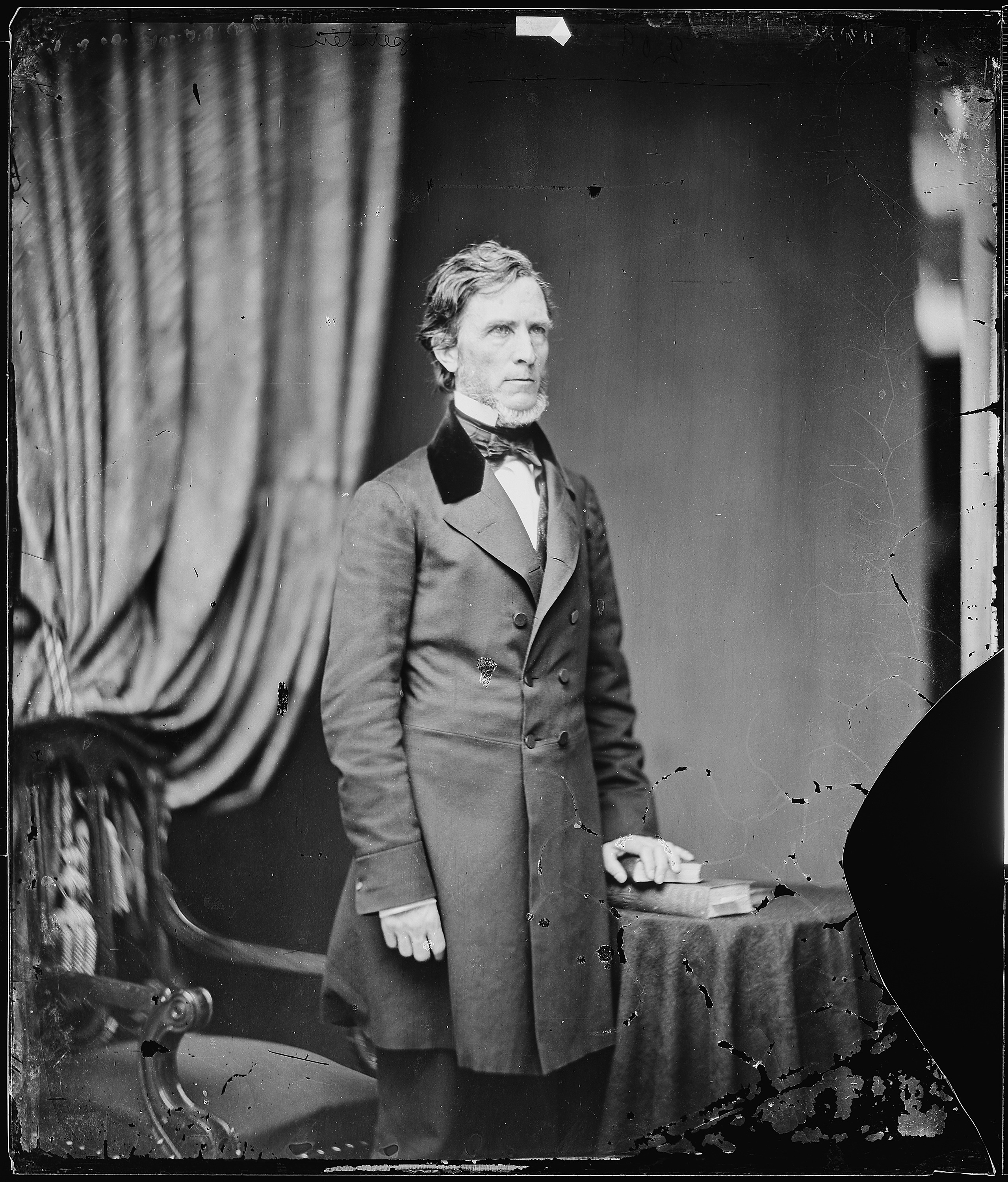
William P. Fessenden, former U.S. Secretary of the Treasury

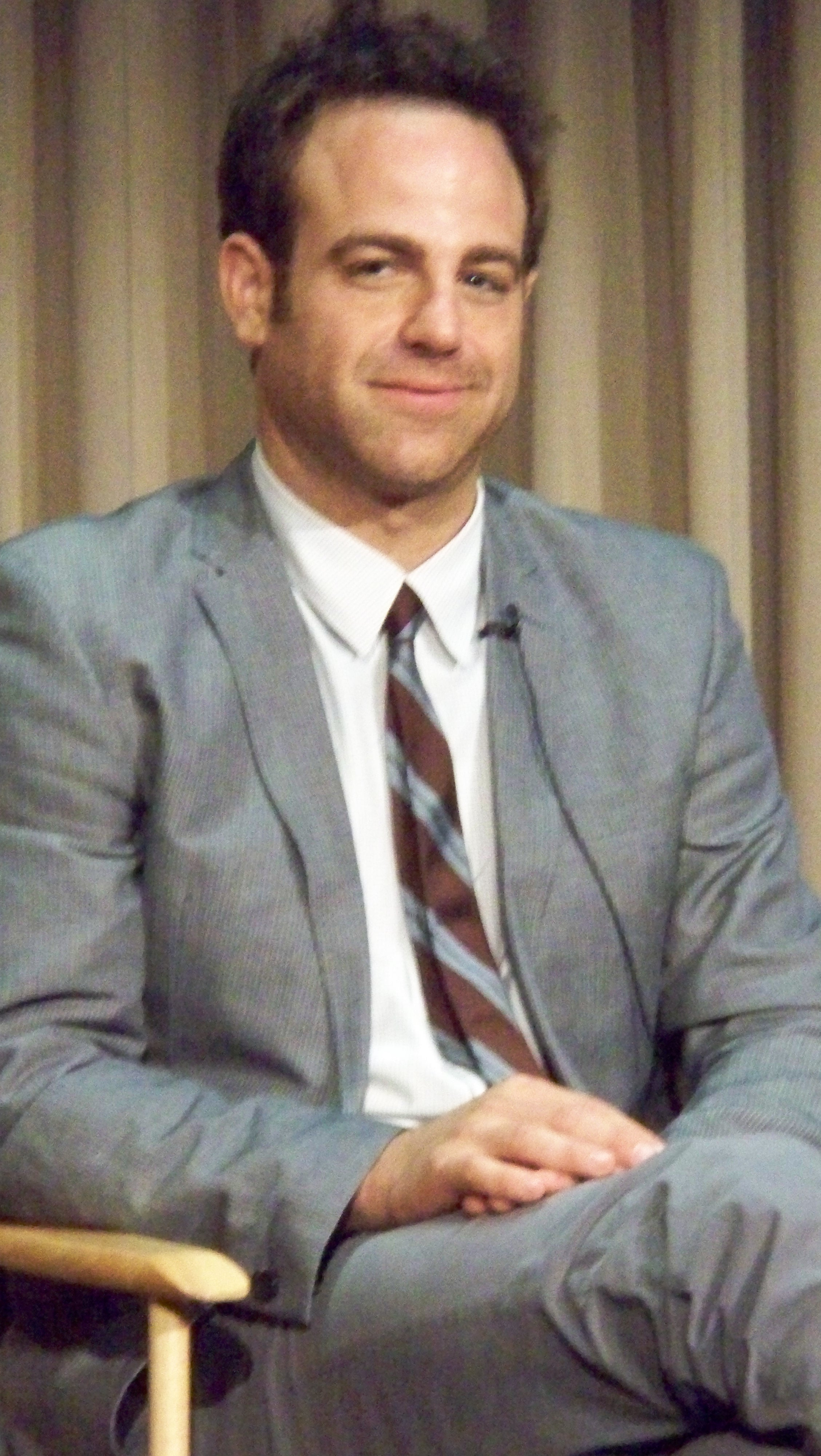
Paul Adelstein, actor

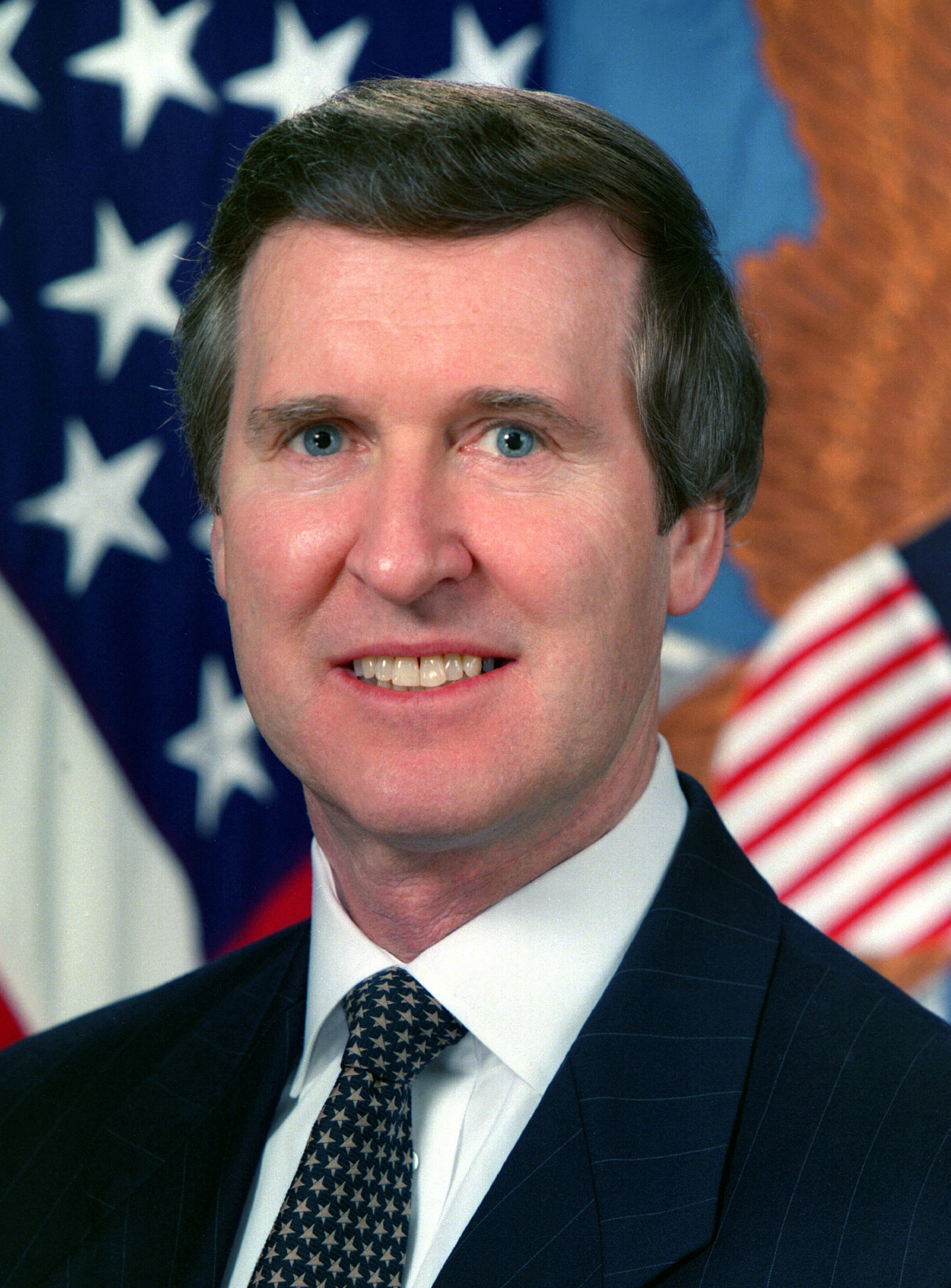
William Cohen, 20th U.S. Secretary of Defense and former U.S. Senator

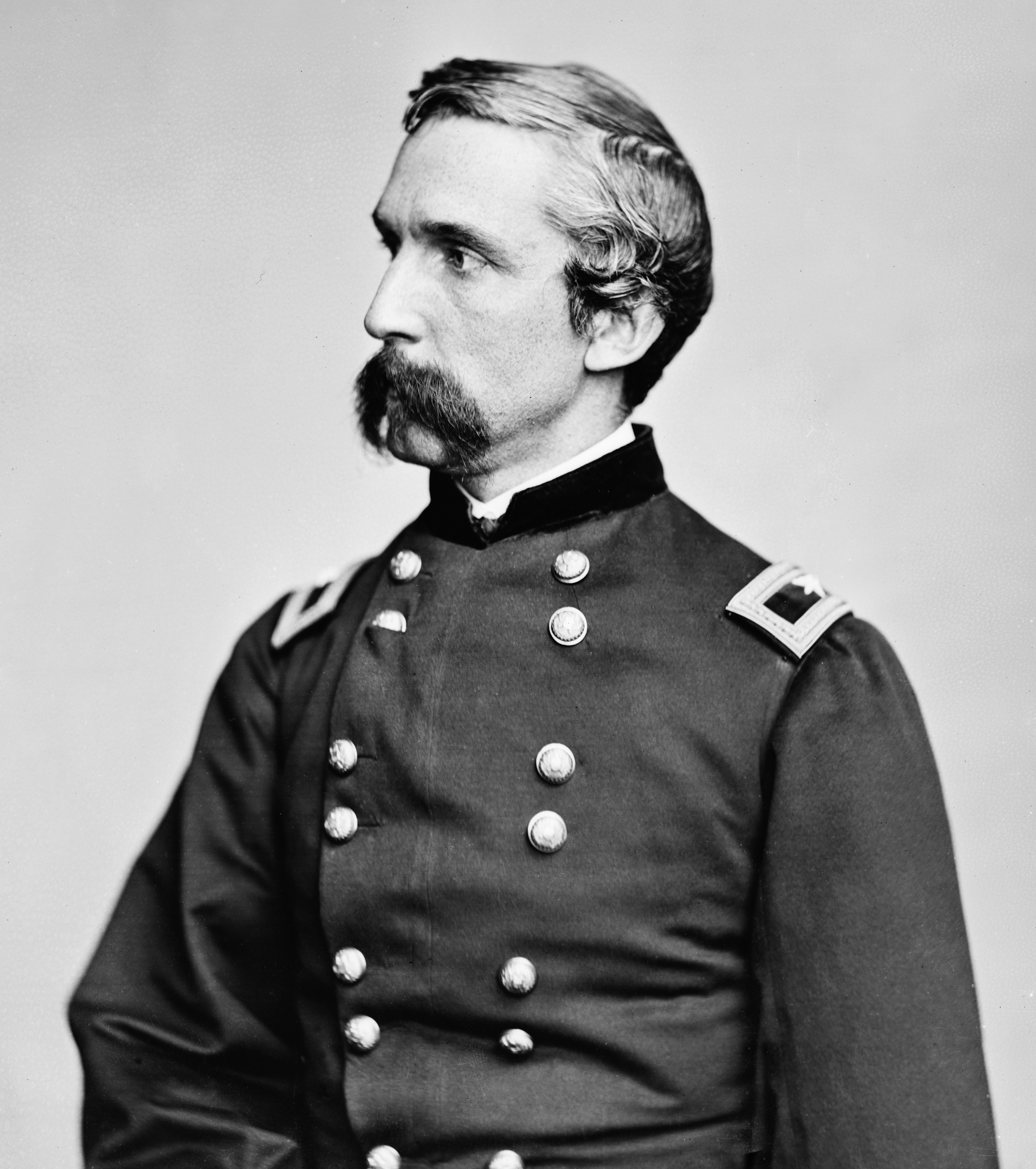
Joshua Chamberlain, brigadier general in the Union Army

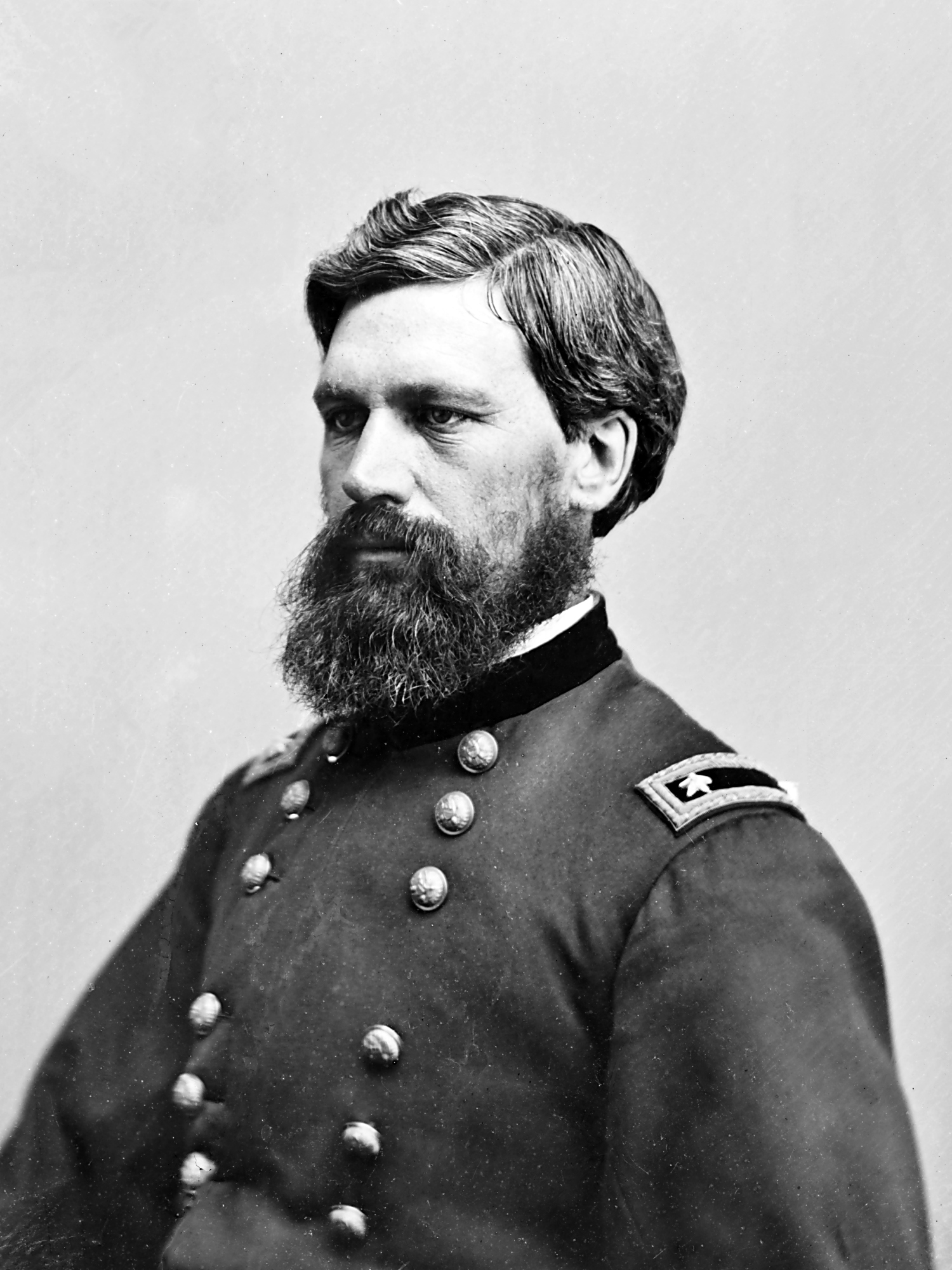
Oliver Otis Howard, major general in the Union Army

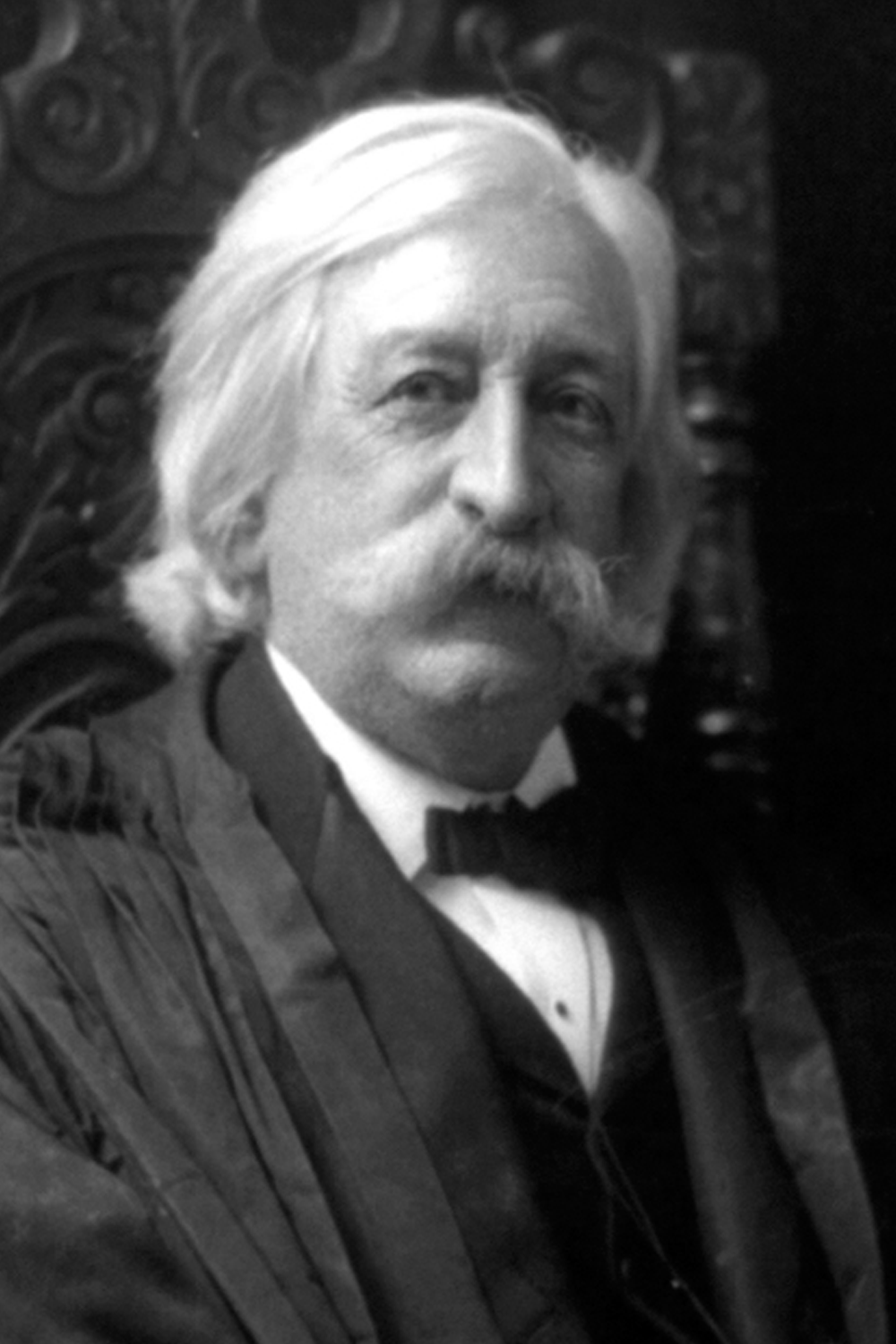
Melville Fuller, 8th Chief Justice of the United States

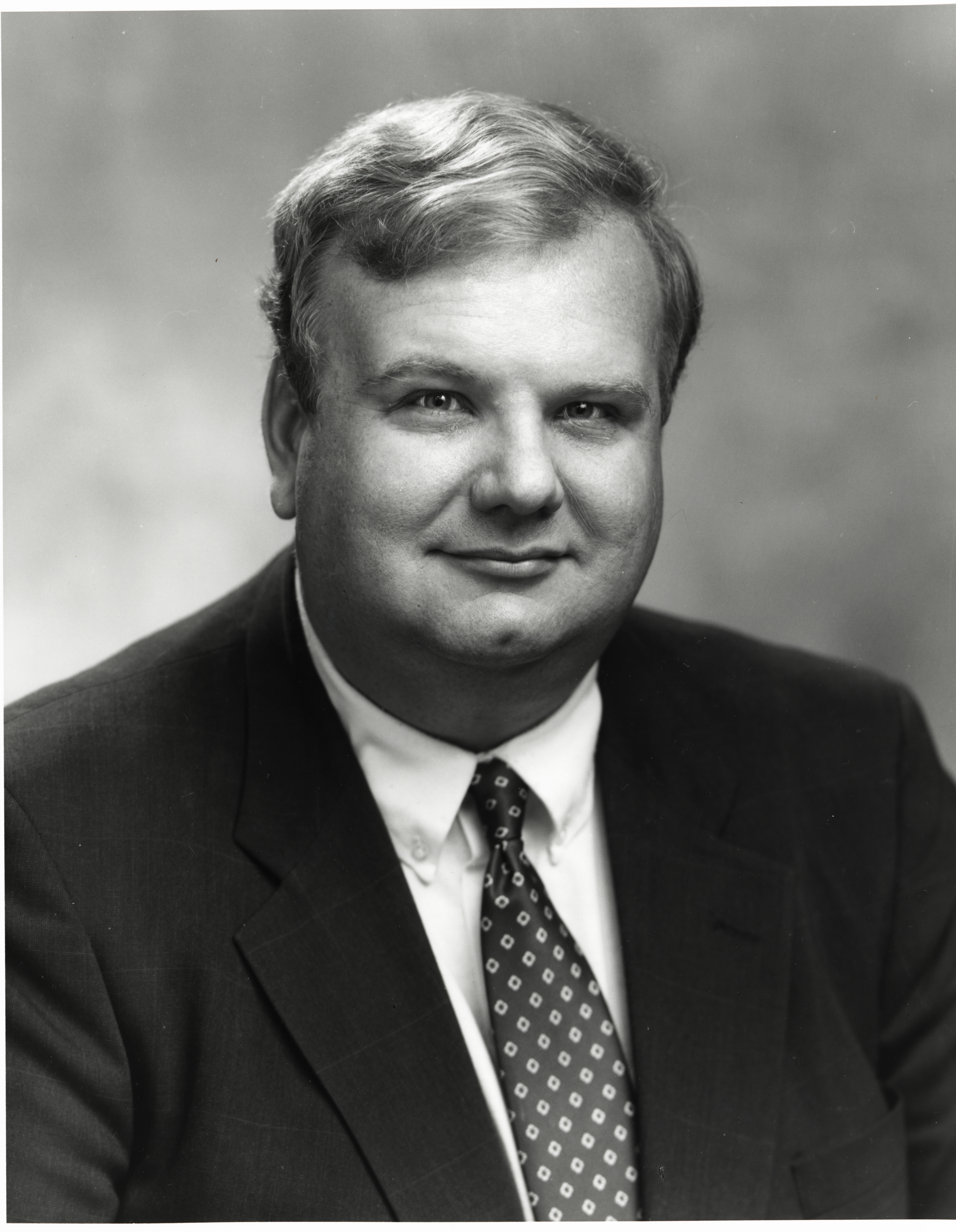
Lawrence B. Lindsey, Member of the Federal Reserve Board of Governors

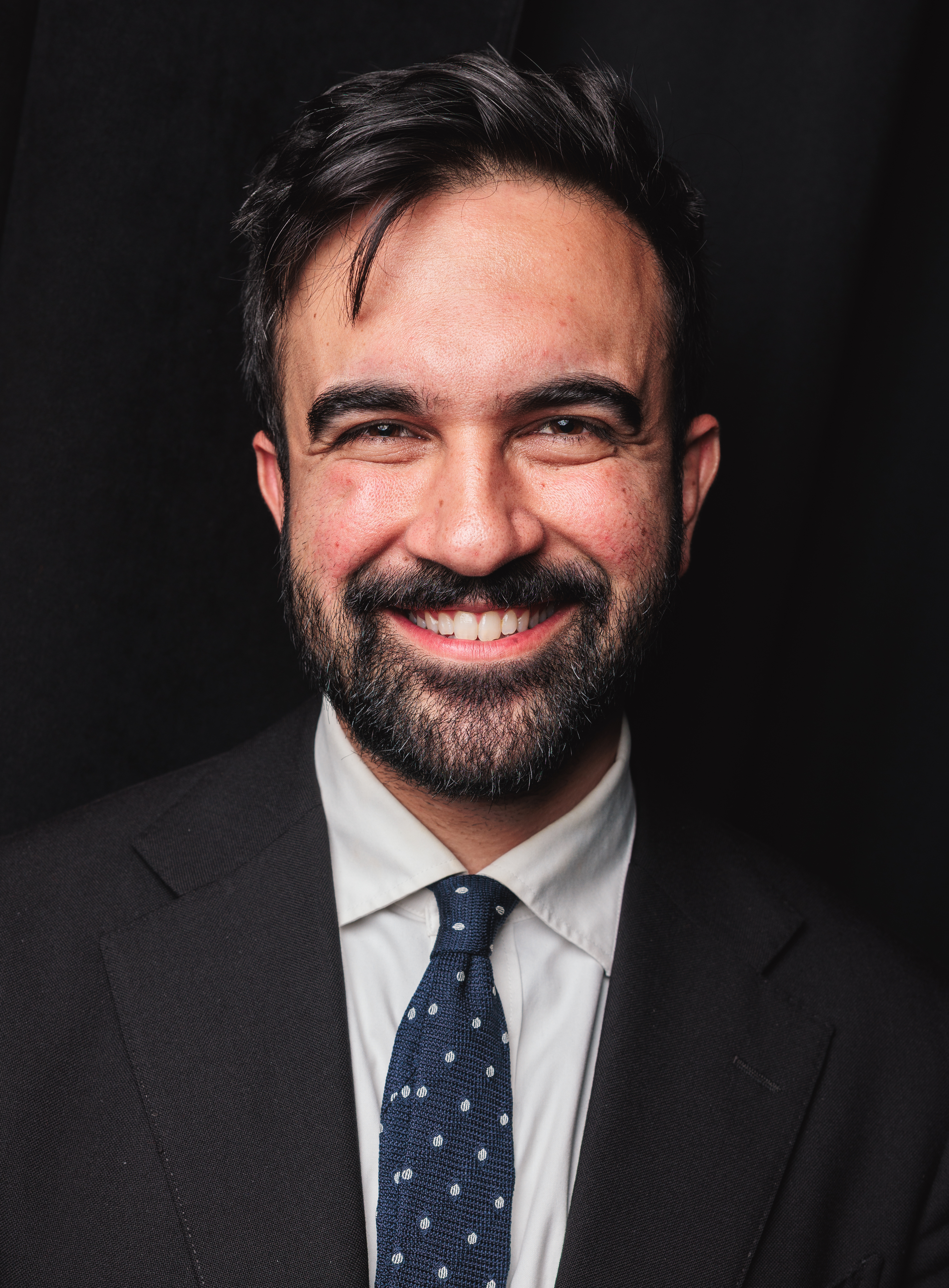
Zohran Mamdani, 112th mayor of New York City

Bowdoin graduates have led all three branches of the American federal government, including both houses of Congress. Franklin Pierce (1824) was America's fourteenth President; Melville Weston Fuller (1853) served as Chief Justice of the United States; Thomas Brackett Reed (1860) was twice elected Speaker of the House of Representatives; and Wallace H. White, Jr. (1899) and George J. Mitchell (1954) both served as Majority Leader of the United States Senate.
