= Carver College (disambiguation) =

Carver College is a private bible college in Atlanta, Georgia.

Carver College may also refer to:

- Carver Junior College (Florida), a former segregated college in Cocoa, Florida
- Carver Junior College (Maryland), a former segregated college in Rockville, Maryland
- Carver College (Charlotte, North Carolina), a former segregated junior college
- Roy J. and Lucille A. Carver College of Medicine, the medical school of the University of Iowa in Iowa City, Iowa
