= Theophilus McKinney =

American university professor and administrator (1933–2004)

Theophilus Elisha McKinney, Jr
- Born: 20 January 1933; Charlotte, North Carolina
- Died: January 15, 2004; Dover, Delaware
- Occupations: Academic and university administrator

Theophilus Elisha McKinney, Jr (1933–2004) was a American professor of political science. He served as vice president of academic affairs at Howard University from 1969 to 1970 and academic dean at Delaware State College from 1975 to 1977. McKinney was appointed vice-president of student affairs at Delaware State College in 1977. His father, Theophilus E. McKinney, Sr. was dean at Johnson C. Smith University and his grandfather, George Patterson McKinney, had been the President of Florida Memorial College.

== Early life and education ==
McKinney was born in Charlotte, North Carolina on January 20, 1933. He was the son of Martha and Theophilus Elisha McKinney, Sr. His father, a Presbyterian minister, was dean of Johnson C. Smith University and his mother was a teacher who taught at West Charlotte High School and Mecklenburg Junior College.

McKinney attended West Charlotte High School. About 1947, McKinney, his mother and sister moved to Boston, Massachusetts where he attended The English High School. He graduated in 1950 and won a $700 scholarship to attend Bowdoin College and an additional $300 scholarship from the Edwards Scholarship Fund.

In 1951, he was in the news when the fraternity he had pledged, Delta Upsilon, was suspended by the national body for admitting a black member. US senator Paul Douglas urged the local chapter not to back down. The university chapter later withdrew from the national fraternity as a result.

At Bowdoin, he worked on the student newspaper, The Bowdoin Orient. In 1954, McKinney graduated from Bowdoin with a bachelor of arts degree and received a Danforth Fellowship Award to attend Tufts University. He obtained a master of arts in law and diplomacy from Tufts in 1957. In 1963, he obtained a PhD from Tufts in 1963.

== Career ==
After graduating from Bowdoin, McKinney got job as a lecturer at Carver College in 1955. This was followed by a position at Tufts. In 1958, he became a teaching fellow at the University of Rangoon in Burma. He was an assistant professor of political science at Florida A&M University from 1959 to 1961 and a professor of political science at Southern University from 1961 to 1965. In 1968, he joined the faculty of Sarah Lawrence College.

In 1969, he became the vice president of academic affairs at Howard University. This was followed, in 1970, by a position as director of research and educational services at the United Negro College Fund.

In 1975, he became an academic dean at Delaware State College, but was replaced in 1977. The same year, he was appointed vice-president of student affairs at Delaware State College.

== Personal life ==
McKinney married Sarah Louise Evans in 1957 and the couple had three daughters.

McKinney died on January 15, 2004 in Dover, Delaware. He was 70.
