= The Bowdoin Orient =

Student newspaper of Bowdoin College

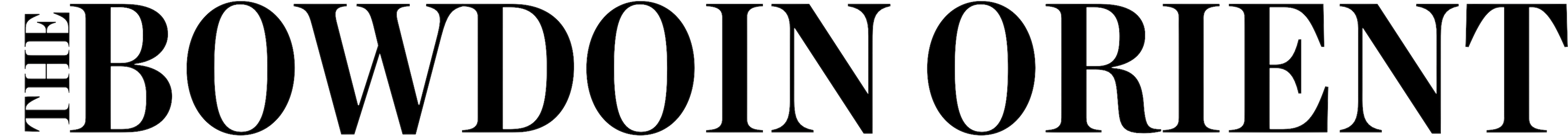

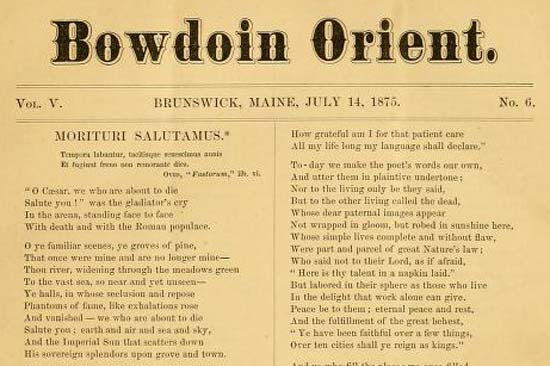
- In July 1875, the paper published Morituri Salutamus, a poem by Henry Wadsworth Longfellow, Bowdoin Class of 1825, delivered for Bowdoin's 1875 commencement.
- Type: Weekly student newspaper
- Format: Broadsheet
- Owner: Bowdoin College
- Editor-in-chief: Ava Arepally and Margaret Unger
- Founded: 1871 (155 years ago)
- Language: English
- Headquarters: 12 Cleveland Street, Brunswick, Maine, U.S.
- Country: United States
- Circulation: 1,500
- OCLC number: 1013419982
- Website: bowdoinorient.com

The Bowdoin Orient is the student newspaper of Bowdoin College in Brunswick, Maine, United States. Established in 1871, the Orient is the oldest continuously published college weekly in the United States.

== History ==
The Bowdoin Orient was established in 1871 as Bowdoin College's newspaper and literary magazine. Originally issued bi-weekly, it has been a weekly since April 1899. It is considered to be the oldest continuously-published college weekly in the U.S., which means that it has been in publication every academic year that Bowdoin has been in session since it began publishing weekly. (Other college weeklies stopped printing during certain war years.)

In the beginning, the Orient was laid out in a smaller magazine format and included literary material such as poems and fiction alongside its news. In 1897, the literary society formed its own publication, The Quill, and the Orient has since primarily focused on reporting news. In 1921, the Orient abandoned the magazine format and moved to a larger broadsheet layout to keep up with the trend of the times. Since then, it has variously moved between broadsheet and tabloid sizes and has seen major format updates every decade or two.

In 1912, The Bowdoin Publishing Company was established as the formal publisher of the Orient, and remained independent of the college for many years, while using college facilities and working with faculty-member advisers. The Bowdoin Publishing Company was a legal, non-profit corporation in the state of Maine for many years, at least from 1968 to 1989, though it was most likely an independent corporation since its inception. In 2002, the college forced the Orient to close the Bowdoin Publishing Company's off-campus checking account, which represented the final step in the company's dissolution.

The Orient building has its own archives, with issues dating back to 1873, but it is missing several periods of time. The Hawthorne-Longfellow Library at Bowdoin College has a nearly complete archive of past Orient issues, both in print and on microform. Virtually all print issues are available from 1871 to the present in the library's George J. Mitchell Department of Special Collections & Archives. Bound copies from 1871 to 1921 can be found in the periodicals section of the library. The Orient is available on microfilm for issues from 1921 to the present. Archives are also available online through the Internet Archive.

== Circulation and distribution ==
The Orient currently has an on-campus print distribution of approximately 1,000, and mails the paper to several hundred paid subscribers, including alumni, parents and other friends of the College. The paper is published each Friday that classes are in session at the presses of the Portland Press Herald. It is distributed to the dining halls, the library, the student union and various other College buildings, as well as in a number of businesses and restaurants in downtown Brunswick.

The Orient began publishing its content on the Web around 2000. Running on a custom content management system, it was redesigned in 2001; 2004, becoming database-driven; 2009, with a visual overhaul; and 2012. The most recent version is a responsive design intended to work better across all devices, including phones and tablets. Web content has always been free. The paper launched online advertisements in 2017.

== Mission statement ==
The current mission statement, published in every edition, reads: "The Bowdoin Orient is a student-run weekly publication dedicated to providing news and information relevant to the College community. Editorially independent of the College and its administrators, the Orient pursues such content freely and thoroughly, following professional journalistic standards in writing and reporting. The Orient is committed to serving as an open forum for thoughtful and diverse discussion and debate on issues of interest to the College community."

== Notable alumni ==
- Kary Antholis, former HBO executive and director of One Survivor Remembers
- Jay Caspian Kang, staff writer at The New York Times Magazine
- Evan Gershkovich, reporter for The Wall Street Journal, detained by Russia in 2023
- Zohran Mamdani, mayor of New York City
- Edward Page Mitchell, co-founder, editorialist for The Sun and early science fiction author
- Cynthia McFadden, NBC News correspondent, former co-anchor of Nightline
- Theophilus McKinney Jr, professor and university administrator
