= Lamplight City =

2018 point-and-click adventure video game

- Developer: Grundislav Games
- Publisher: Application Systems
- Designer: Francisco González
- Composer: Mark Benis
- Engine: Adventure Game Studio
- Platforms: Nintendo Switch, Windows, macOS, Linux
- Release: WW: September 13, 2018
- Genre: Point-and-click adventure

Lamplight City is a point-and-click adventure game developed by American studio Grundislav Games and released in 2018 by Application Systems Heidelberg. The game takes place in an alternate history version of 19th century America that incorporates steampunk elements, in which players take control of a private detective who tackles a series of cases while trying to uncover the identity of a criminal who caused their partner's death. Players can decide how to acquire information and how a case is solved, with the game's overall ending affected by the choices made.

A spiritual successor, Rosewater, was released on March 27th, 2025. Although set within the same world, it focuses on an alternate history version of the American West.

== Gameplay ==
Gameplay screenshot.

Players conduct the game as a former cop turned private detective in their efforts to solve a series of cases. Each of the game's locations, those relevant to a case and uncovered during an investigation, feature various objects that can be examined - some are trivial, while others may hide important clues to the current case - alongside a variety of individuals who can be questioned on different subjects. Any relevant information, such as clues and documents, are recorded in a casebook belonging to the detective; any objects that can be used to help solve puzzles, are also stored in the casebook, rather than the traditional inventory system used by games of the same genre, and used automatically where needed. Alongside clues and documents, the casebook also lists any possible suspects based on clues and conversations with relevant people, and a list of objectives which define what the player should be doing in their investigation.

With the exception of the first case, the game's prologue, each case features a choice in how to proceed in various circumstances - for example, if a player tries to get a character to be more co-operative through using something against them, they are given a choice of how to do so. While the correct choice will allow them to glean new information, the wrong choice will close off an avenue of investigation to them, and effectively a solution to how a crime was committed. Although a game does not end if the player chooses incorrectly, what choices are made can not only determine how an investigation concludes - including who, if any, is arrested for a crime - but also impact the game's overall ending; repeated mistakes with choices and declaring cases unsolvable, ultimately lead to the game's negative ending.

== Plot ==
=== Setting ===
Lamplight City takes place within an alternate 19th century Earth that incorporates steampunk elements. In this timeline, the North American colonies remained a part of the British Empire and developed into a nation called Vespuccia, which retains many elements of British culture at the time, including currency and political systems, with the Industrial Revolution being more advanced and developing "steam-tech" that included automated machines and airships. The game's story takes place with the city of New Bretagne—a city that combines the Victorian elements of New Orleans, New York and London—divided into several districts, which is facing growing disruptions against the growing use of steam-tech.

=== Story ===
In 1844, detectives Miles Fordham and Bill Leger visit New Bretagne's roughest district to investigate a report about a series of break-ins at a flower shop. The men learn that a thief regularly breaks in to steal an order of flowers from the shop, but mysteriously leaves money behind in the process. Miles' decision to stake out the shop and catch the thief in the act goes disastrously wrong when they are spooked, and the subsequent pursuit to the rooftop causes the untimely death of Bill. Guilt-ridden over his partner's death, Miles retires from the city's police and pursues a new career as a private investigator. However, following the funeral he begins to hear the voice of his deceased partner, who urges him to locate the burglar who caused his death, forcing him to take a sleeping medicine to cope with the strain it places on both his mental well-being and personal life with his wife Adelaide.

To help him deal with the death of his partner, Constance Upton, a female assistant in the city's police and close friend, provides leads to cases for him to investigate. A few months into his new career, Miles is give a series of cases by Upton to solve - the attempted murder of a wealthy woman; the kidnapping of an infant child; the suspicious death of a woman found burnt to ashes; and the murder of a man during Vespuccia's election night. As he attempts to investigate the cases, Miles begins to change how he copes, opting to stop taking his medicine and go drinking at the pub he and Bill visit. However, his decision causes him to become estranged with his wife, who forces him out of their home after being unable to cope with his change in behavior, and leaving him no choice but to stay with Upton as a result.

Shortly after successfully completing all or most of his cases, Miles is informed by Upton that a member of the Vespuccian parliament was recently murdered by a serial killer known as "The Justice Killer". Upton explains that until this latest murder, the only connection with the other victims was that they all came from the same district. Providing him with crime scene sketches she had copied, Upton asks Miles to investigate the case due to the increasing panic amongst the city's inhabitants. Reviewing the sketches, Miles discovers that all the victims received an Easter lily: the same kind of flower that had been stolen by the burglar he and Bill tried to arrest. When his former boss, Police Chief Snelling, arrives to question Upton on her recent actions of leaking police investigations, Miles convinces him to let him investigate the murders, and is given until the following day to solve it or be arrested for meddling in police affairs.

Investigating each of the previous victims soon leads Miles to learn that each of the murdered men either beat up or killed a woman, most of whom were prostitutes, and that the killer sought justice for these. When he visits the brothel linked to the murders, Miles learns that Samuel Collins, the nephew of one of the prostitutes, was both the killer and the thief. He discovers evidence showing that he sought justice against men that had attacked women, in response to his aunt's death at the hand of a client, leaving Easter lilies behind to honor her memory. Miles eventually confronts Samuel at his home and denounces him as the killer, disagreeing with his belief of justice. Before Samuel can strangle Fordham to prevent exposure, Snelling arrives and kills him, commending Miles on solving the case.

A few weeks later, Miles visits Bill's grave, admitting that he misses his voice since it had stopped upon catching his killer, but believes both have now gotten what they wanted and can now move on.

=== Alternate Endings ===
While the above is the canon storyline of the game, depending on how the player chooses to handle a situation, certain key moments directly impact how the game might end instead:

- If the player has someone else arrested in each case and not the culprit of the investigation that is canon to the story, Samuel Collins is identified as the killer by Miles, who decides to pass on his information to the police the following day. Samuel promptly pursues after him through his contacts in the brothel, finding him at Upton's apartment. Although he attacks the wrong person before confronting Miles, Upton recovers and kills him before he can kill Miles. The rest of the ending plays out as the true ending of the story.
- If the player exposes Upton for her theft of the sketches or arrests the wrong person sought after to provide a lead during the final case, Miles is thrown in prison on a charge of obstructing justice, leaving him to trapped in a cell and having to endure Bill's voice tormenting him on his fate.
- If the player denounces most of the four cases as unsolvable, Miles decides to admit himself into the city's asylum, asking Upton to promise that she will conceal his action from his wife. Bill struggles to torment Miles for committing himself to a mental institution, as his friend prepares to undergo treatment to cure himself.

== Development and release ==
Lamplight City uses the Adventure Game Studio engine. The inventory system was inspired by the 1997 video game Blade Runner. Other influences include Edgar Allan Poe, Charles Dickens, Dishonored, and Gabriel Knight: Sins of the Fathers. The fictional city in which the game is set, New Bretagne, is a mix of New York City, New Orleans, and Victorian London.

Video game developer Francisco Gonzalez had previously worked for Wadjet Eye Games, who was to publish the game. After the release of Shardlight in 2016, Gonzalez was laid off as a full time designer. Ultimately, he and Wadjet Eye decided not to go forward with publishing Lamplight City, citing creative differences. As a result, Gonzalez sought a new publisher. Applications Systems Heidelberg released it on September 13, 2018.

Jess Haskins, an adjunct game design professor at the NYU Game Center, was a script editor on the game.

== Reception ==
On Metacritic, a review aggregator, the PC version has a score of 72/100 based on 16 reviews, which the site categorizes as "mixed or average reviews". GameSpot rated it 6/10 stars; reviewer James O'Connor wrote that the game is "full of great ideas, but isn't quite able to pull them off effectively". Although praising the character and dialogue, O'Connor said the ability to fail a case turns out to be a gimmick, as the cases are not challenging.

Richard Hoover of Adventure Gamers rated it 3/5 stars, praising the visuals, sound, music, and worldbuilding. However, Hoover wrote that the game is not sufficiently interactive. Instead of offering branching storylines, player choices seem not to affect the story much except for possibly locking out certain content. Reviewing the game for Hardcore Gaming101, Jonathan Kaharl wrote that although the game initially seems to be lacking, its polish and excellent design makes it "one of the tightest, most constantly great games" of its genre. Although she said the game is a bit too easy, Tina Olah of RPGFan rated it 82/100 and called it "just plain fun", highlighting the plot as "genuinely interesting and surprising".

Destructoid was positive, writing, "The cases aren't especially taxing, but the well-realized setting and characters add plenty of flavor and help the game feel like something more than the sum of its parts."

The game was nominated for "Best Original Choral Composition" with "Down Among the Dead Men" at the 2019 G.A.N.G. Awards.

== See also ==
- Rosewater
- Wadjet Eye Games
- Adventure Game Studio
