= Down Among the Dead Men (song) =

Song
- Language: English
- Published: 1728
- Genre: Drinking song
- Composer: Henry Purcell (possible)
- Lyricist: John Dyer (possible)

"Down Among the Dead Men" is an English drinking song first published in 1728, but possibly of greater antiquity.

The song begins with a toast to "the King" and continues with obeisances to the god Bacchus which become increasingly less subtle descriptions of the benefits of alcohol in procuring opportunities for sexual intercourse. At the conclusion of each stanza of the song, those who deny the song's declarations are condemned to lay "down among the dead men", another term for drunken unconsciousness.

== Background ==
Peter Dawson sings "Down Among the Dead Men" in a 1909 recording.

The lyrics to the song have been most widely attributed to John Dyer. According to Charles Mackay, it was first performed at the theatre at Lincoln's Inn Fields. Another source gives credit for the melody to Henry Purcell, noting that it was first published in 1728 in The Dancing Master, a multi-volume book of songs from Pearson & Young, but is likely of older origin. The song maintained its popularity into the Victorian era, with the lyrics modified to replace the word "King" with the word "Queen" during the reign of Queen Victoria.

The song makes use of a number of metaphors, most prominently the song's title "Down Among the Dead Men". "Dead men" or "dead soldiers" is a term for empty bottles and the expression "to lie down among the dead men" means to get so drunk as to slip from one's chair and land under the table where the empty bottles have been discarded.

== Modern arrangements ==
Sample of Stanford's Concert Variations upon an English Theme is an 1898 arrangement of "Down Among the Dead Men".

- In 1898 Charles Villiers Stanford used "Down Among the Dead Men" as a theme for a series of orchestral variations, Concert Variations upon an English Theme.
- Joyce Kilmer wrote new lyrics to the song between 1904 and 1905 for use by the Delta Upsilon fraternity in the United States and Canada.
- The song found its way into a number of late 19th and early 20th century songbooks of universities in the English-speaking world, including those of Columbia University, Northwestern University, McGill University, and the University of Oxford.
- The Australian experimental pop group Flash and the Pan included a ballad of the same name on their eponymous 1978 album that references "Down Among The Dead Men" in its chorus ("and the band played / Down Among the Dead Men").
- The 2000 album Down Among the Deadmen by American heavy metal band The Lord Weird Slough Feg is titled for the song.
- Several vocal and instrumental performances of "Down Among the Dead Men" are included in the 2013 video game Assassin's Creed IV: Black Flag and its soundtrack. It also appears in Assassin's Creed Syndicate in several music boxes hidden throughout London.
- In 2017 Mad Duck recorded a version of "Down among the dead men" in album Braggart Stories and Dark Poems.
- In 2019, the videogame Lamplight City included a rendition of "Down Among the Dead Men" as its credits theme, arranged by Mark Benis.
- On the Starz show, Outlander, a stanza from "Down Among the Dead Men" is sung at the end of the episode "Prestonpans".
- The song is sung by Wessex villagers in Robert Harris's 2019 novel The Second Sleep.
- An instrumental version of the song is part of the Republic of Pirates theme in the 2025 video game Sid Meier's Civilization VII.

== Lyrics ==
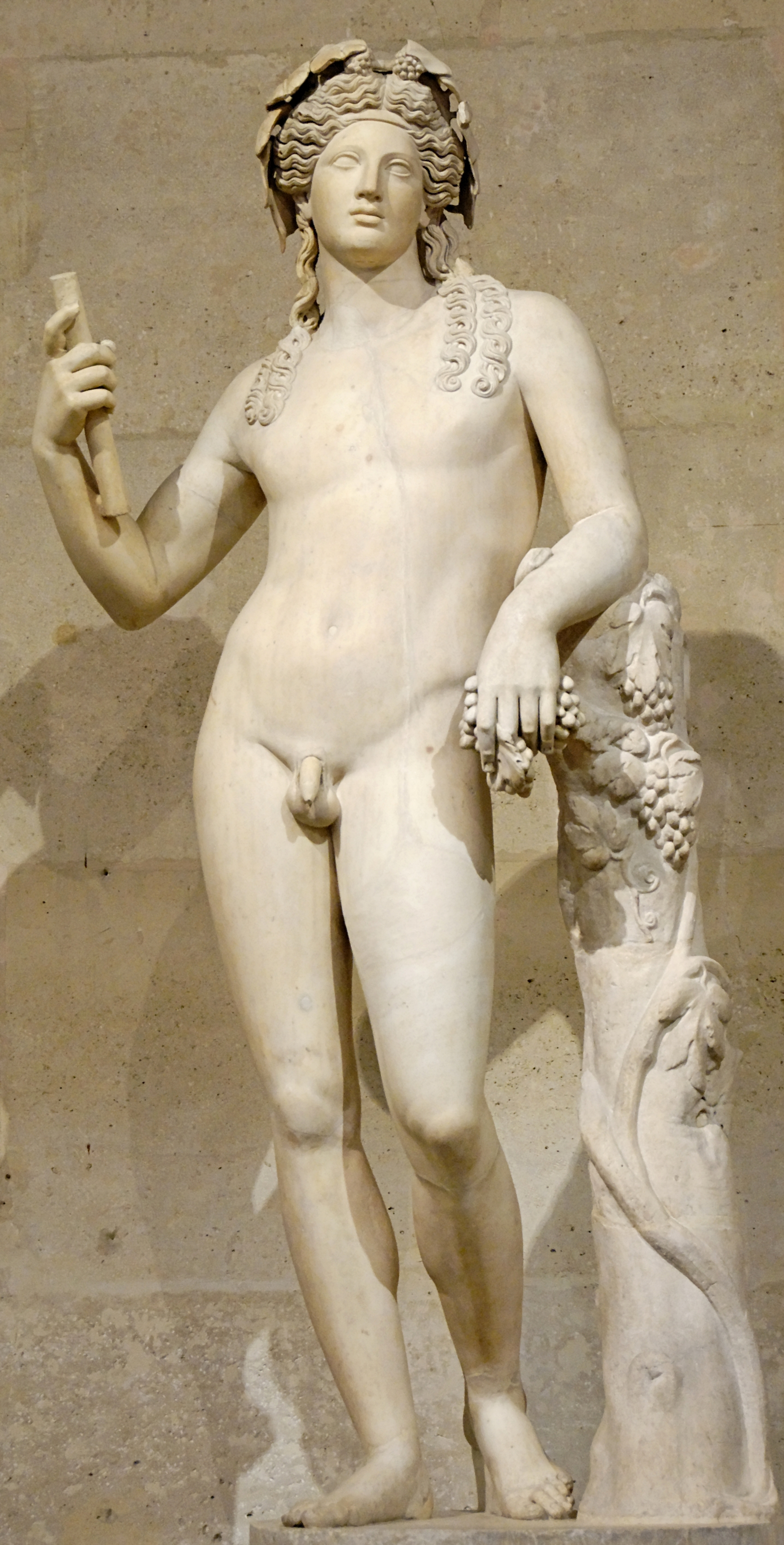
The third and fourth stanzas of "Down Among the Dead Men" reference Bacchus, the Roman god of wine, fertility, and ritual madness.

Here's a health to the King and a lasting peace
To faction an end, to wealth increase.
Come, let us drink it while we have breath,
For there's no drinking after death.
And he that will this health deny,
Down among the dead men, down among the dead men,
Down, down, down, down;
Down among the dead men let him lie!

Let charming beauty's health go round,
With whom celestial joys are found.
And may confusion yet pursue,
That selfish woman-hating crew.
And he who'd woman's health deny,
Down among the dead men, down among the dead men,
Down, down, down, down;
Down among the dead men let him lie!

In smiling Bacchus' joys I'll roll,
Deny no pleasure to my soul.
Let Bacchus' health round briskly move,
For Bacchus is a friend to Love;
And they that would this health deny,
Down among the dead men, down among the dead men,
Down, down, down, down;
Down among the dead men let him lie!

May love and wine their rights maintain,
And their united pleasures reign.
While Bacchus' treasure crowns the board,
We'll sing the joy that both afford.
And they that won't with us comply,
Down among the dead men, down among the dead men,
Down, down, down, down;
Down among the dead men let them lie!
