= Rosewater (video game) =

2025 video game

- Developer: Grundislav Games
- Publisher: Application Systems Heidelberg
- Designer: Francisco González
- Platform: Linux; macOS; Microsoft Windows
- Release: March 27, 2025
- Genre: Adventure
- Mode: Single-player

Rosewater is a point-and-click adventure game developed by Grundislav Games. The game tells the story of Harley Leger, a freelance writer who travels to the frontier town of Rosewater in an alternate history version of the American West. It is set in the same world as the studio's previous game, Lamplight City.

The game was announced March 12th, 2019 and features the voices of Greg Chun, Roger Clark, Neil Ross, Maya Murphy and more. It was released March 27, 2025.

== Plot ==
The game focuses on Harley Leger (voiced by Maya Murphy), who arrives at the town of Rosewater to start a job in journalism. She is assigned an interview with wild west legend Gentleman Jake (Gavin Hammon) and his assistant, sharpshooter Danny Luo (Matthew Yang King).

After Harley shows off her capabilities in a bar brawl, the two rope Harley into their mission: finding a fortune, the remains of an investment from one Dr Bennett Clark's benefactors, in his abandoned lab. Dr Clark had come to Rosewater after a terrible accident at the Lamplight City Expo leaves bystanders and his assistant dead; he had continued his research there before again disappearing. The topic of his research, the "aether", has even inspired the formation of a cult.

While investigating, the trio comes across a fort in the desert, where they meet a General Filomeno "Phil" Marquez (Christian Lanz), an idealistic rebel from New Spain forced to flee his homeland. On an excursion with the fort's captain, they're taken captive by O'odham scouts. The tribe's Chief Luzi tasks the group with raiding an army supply wagon; they're joined by healer Nadine Redbird (G.K. Bowes). Following the raid, the group continue their quest for Dr. Clark’s fortune, finding a clue in his laboratory that he's headed west, for the city of El Presidio.

The group hires a driver, Lola Johnson (Leilani Jones), to take them there. In the journey, which takes several days, Harley and her companions encounter different obstacles, including con artists, settlers, bandits, and eccentrics, stopping to help people and engage in randomized encounter vignettes that branch based on player choices, affecting Harley's relationship with them and revealing more of the characters' backstories.

Before arriving in El Presidio, the group is stopped by the Blackburns, a national, government-sanctioned police force akin to the Pinkertons. The Blackburns' leader Carson hints that the group has crossed powerful figures. The encounter turns into a gunfight. Once subdued, Carson attempts to kill Harley, who is saved by either General Filomeno, Nadine Redbird, or Danny Luo, depending on which of the three she has the closest relationship with. Harley goes to find Gentleman Jake, who has hidden during the gunfight, revealing himself as a braggart and a fraud. If Danny or Filomeno have saved Harley, they die; Nadine lives, but is injured.

The survivors in the group finally arrive at El Presidio. Lola abandons the group, keeping the relationship professional. The group meets with DW Shaw, an oil company owner who'd first hired Gentleman Jake to find Dr Clark, wanting him to develop an alternative energy source. The group eventually enters the Jolly Good Club, a gentleman's club, where Harley meets an army general, LaPorte, and finds a clue that Dr Clark is working in a lab underground on Gannet Island, just offshore.

When they break into the lab, they find Dr Clark working on a superweapon based on the aether that LaPorte thinks will give the nation military supremacy; it becomes apparent this isn't an officially sanctioned military project, and that it was LaPorte who hired the Blackburns because the group had raided his wagon. Harley convinces Dr Clark to leave with her, but LaPorte interrupts the group, facing Harley and her companions against a wall. Harley, having learned that the gun Dr Clark has developed is unstable, stalls for time, tricking LaPorte. Depending on her actions in the game, different characters appear at the island to assist in rounding up his troops.

In the ending, the companions’ paths diverge based on the relationships built during the journey. Harley returns to Rosewater and writes up her story. Her editor tells her nobody would believe it, but says it has potential as a novel. The game ends with Harley finishing the book, wondering if she'd ever again have such an adventure.

== Development ==
Rosewater is set within the universe of Lamplight City, as the game's designer, Francisco González, wanted to explore more of that game's world. He began thinking of the game during Lamplight City's development, deciding on creating the "complete opposite" of its industrial setting with a rural, wide-open space, settling on the American West. However, the game didn't enter production until January 2019.

Unlike Lamplight City, Rosewater uses a traditional point-and-click adventure game inventory system. Rosewater uses a higher resolution (1280 × 720) than González's previous games, although it shares their engine, Adventure Game Studio.

González worked as a designer, writer, artist, and programmer on the game, rotoscoping the animations. Jess Haskins, an adjunct game design professor at the NYU Game Center, co-wrote it.

== Reception ==
Reception

Aggregate scores
Aggregator	Score
Metacritic	82/100
OpenCritic	92% recommend

Rosewater received generally favorable reviews from critics, according to the review aggregation website Metacritic. Fellow review aggregator OpenCritic assessed that the game received strong approval, being recommended by 92% of critics. Vice said the game brings "the technical polish of today's age while retaining an old-school charm," adding: "If you're looking for a charming, dynamic adventure through the Western Frontier, strap in those boots and saddle up" and giving it a Highly Recommended verdict.

Rock Paper Shotgun was more ambivalent about the game, praising it but criticising its adherence to point-and-click adventure game formulas: "It's one of those games that, if I had played it from the dusty disk drive of my parents' Dell Inspiron circa 2010, I would think about it once every couple of weeks. In a decade of updates to point-and-click formulas, Rosewater refuses to update basically anything, for better and for worse."

PC Gamer described Rosewater as a "worthwhile journey" with "genuine charm," praising its Western steampunk setting and narrative. While adhering to traditional point-and-click mechanics, it was noted for offering fresh ideas and a strong lead character. Yahoo! praised the game's "compelling story," "memorable characters," and atmospheric steampunk Western setting, but noted some pacing issues. Adventure Game Hotspot praised Rosewater for its "authentic-feeling Western" atmosphere, strong production values, and player-driven branching storylines, writing, "The wait for its release was clearly worth it, as this is masterful, cinematic storytelling, where the journey and evolving camaraderie are more important than the destination." It added, however, that there was little complexity or challenge to the puzzles.

Adventure Gamers gave the game a glowing, five-star review, calling it a "modern classic...an experience that players will remember long after the game is over." RPGFan called it an "excellent Western point-and-click adventure," noting "minor bugs" and a "linear quest" as cons but concluding it was an "excellent Western point-and-click adventure."

The game was nominated for "Best Performance" in the 2025 IndieCade Festival.

== See also ==
- Lamplight City
- Adventure Game Studio
