= Delta Upsilon =

North American collegiate fraternity

- ΔΥ
- Founded: November 4, 1834; 192 years ago Williams College
- Type: Social
- Affiliation: NIC
- Status: Active
- Scope: International
- Motto: Δικαία Ὑποθήκη (misspelled on the coat of arms as Δικαία Ὑποθἠκη) "Justice Our Foundation"
- Slogan: "Building Better Men"
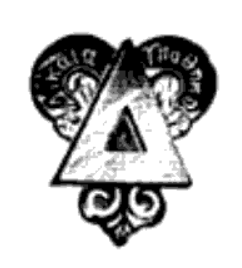
- Member badge
- Colors: Sapphire Blue and Old Gold
- Flag
- Mascot: Duck (unofficial)
- Publication: The Delta Upsilon Quarterly
- Chapters: 68 active chapters (2017); 7 colonies 155 chapters installed
- Members: 3,954 undergraduate 80,000 living alumni active 110,000+ lifetime
- Headquarters: 8705 Founders Road; Indianapolis, Indiana 46268; United States
- Website: deltau.org

Delta Upsilon (ΔΥ), commonly known as DU, is a collegiate men's fraternity founded in 1834 at Williams College in Williamstown, Massachusetts. It is the sixth-oldest, all-male, college Greek-letter organization founded in North America (only Kappa Alpha Society, Sigma Phi, Delta Phi, Alpha Delta Phi, and Psi Upsilon predate). It is popularly and informally known as "DU" or "Delta U" and its members are called "DUs". Although historically found on the campuses of small New England private universities, Delta Upsilon currently has 76 chapters/colonies across the United States and Canada. A number of its buildings are listed on the National Register of Historic Places.

In 2013, Business Insider named Delta Upsilon one of the "17 Fraternities with Top Wall Street Alumni". Notable members include President of the United States James A. Garfield, President of Colombia Juan Manuel Santos, Canadian prime minister Lester B. Pearson, Linus Pauling, Joseph P. Kennedy, Lou Holtz, Kurt Vonnegut Jr., Charles Evans Hughes, Les Aspin, James Smith McDonnell and others. Forty-two brothers of the fraternity have sat in the United States Congress, three in the Parliament of Canada, one in the Imperial House of Peers of Japan, and six on the Queen's Privy Council for Canada. Its members have received six Nobel Prizes, five Olympic gold medals, one Pulitzer Prize, four Medals of Honor, one Lenin Peace Prize, one Presidential Medal of Freedom, seven investitures into the Order of Canada, and one investiture each into the Order of St Michael and St George, the Order of Merit, and the Royal Norwegian Order of St. Olav.

In 2018, the fraternity adopted policies to reduce risk. As of August 1, 2018, the fraternity banned hard alcohol from all chapter houses. As of August 1, 2020, chapter houses must be "substance-free" (including wine, beer, and drugs), except for chapters that obtained waivers through 2022, based upon good behavior.

== History ==
=== Founding and early history ===
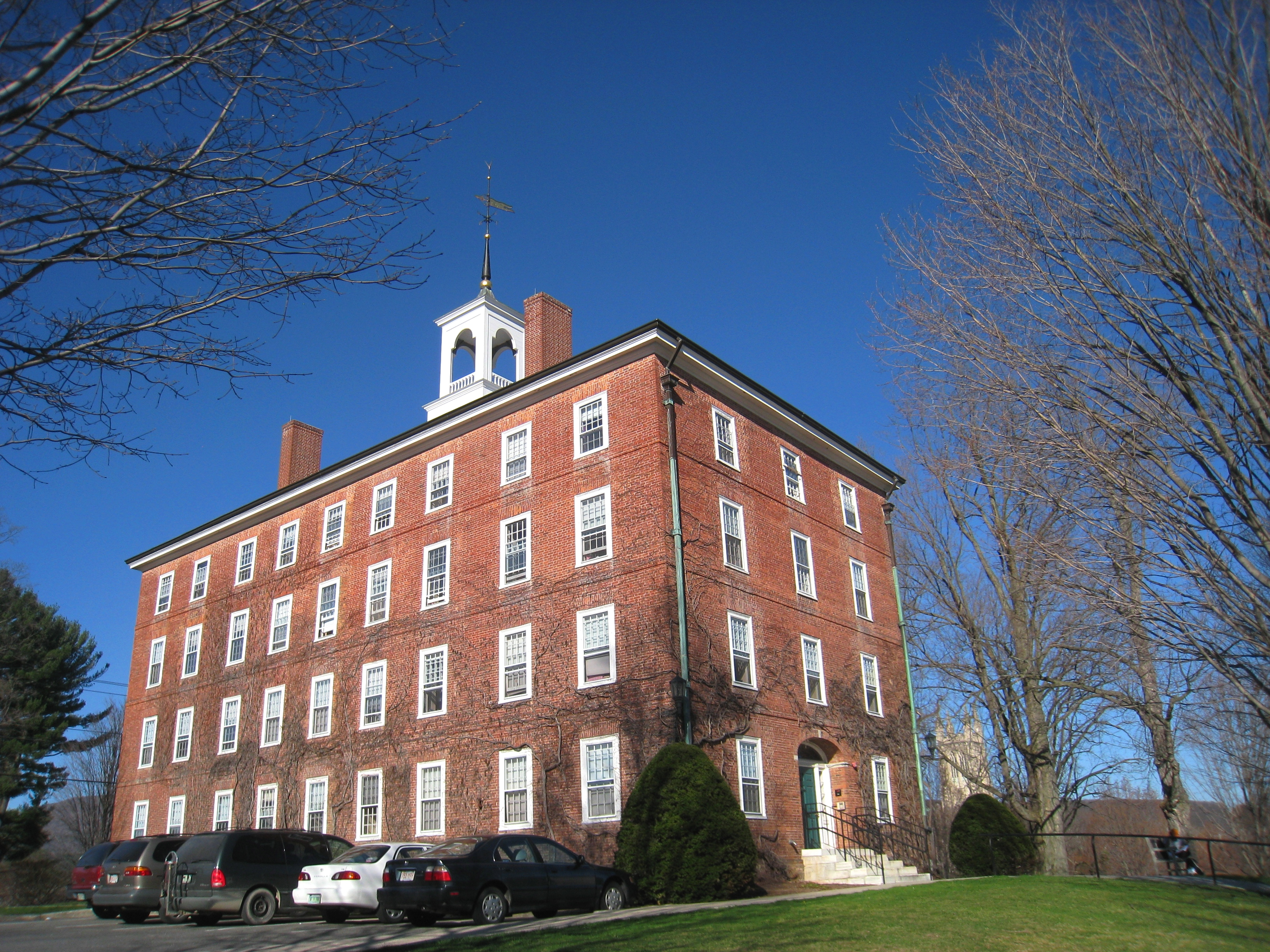
Delta Upsilon's mother chapter was founded in 1834 in the West College building (pictured) at Williams College.

Delta Upsilon was founded on November 4, 1834, when thirty freshman, sophomore, and junior students at Williams College met in the Freshman Recitation Room at the West College building to form what was then called "the Social Fraternity". The move was in response to the establishment of Kappa Alpha Society and Sigma Phi at the college and, unlike those fraternities, the Social Fraternity was avowedly anti-secret. Its founding came at the tail end of the anti-Masonic hysteria that had recently swept the United States. However, the idea that it was part of the popular backlash to Freemasonry has generally been rejected (a mysterious fire in 1841 destroyed the records of the first meeting of the Social Fraternity, erasing much of the organization's early history).

Growth of the Social Fraternity (whose members were informally called the "Oudens") was exponential. By 1838, two-thirds of all students at Williams belonged to the society, which engaged in militant agitation against the other two fraternities. One particularly violent incident occurred in 1839 when Oudens assaulted the Kappa Alpha house, driving its occupants to the top of Consumption Hill. More refined conflict took the form of pamphlets and debate. An 1855 debate proposed by Kappa Alpha against the Oudens was called-off after the Social Fraternity appointed James Garfield, an Ouden well known for his rhetorical skills, to represent them.

In November 1847, Williams' Social Fraternity met with similar societies that had recently been formed at Union College, Hamilton College, and Amherst College and formed the "Anti-Secret Confederation". A second meeting of the Anti-Secret Confederation (A.S.C.) in 1852 saw fraternities from Wesleyan University, Case Western Reserve University, Colby College, and the University of Vermont join.

At the 1862 convention, the fraternity's mother chapter, Williams, declared that the purposes of the fraternity had been corrupted and, over the objections of the other chapters, withdrew. Two years later, it dissolved itself. A chapter would eventually be restored. However, Williams being the first chapter and, therefore, self-chartering, this would come in the form of a new chapter and not the revival of the original. It was permanently erased when Williams College banned all fraternities in 1962.

Kōjirō Matsukata (bottom right), the son of Prince Matsukata, was initiated into Delta Upsilon at Rutgers University in 1885.

The March 1864 convention of the A.S.C. saw the organization formally change its name to Delta Upsilon, standardize insignia and ritual throughout all its member chapters, and establish a centralized administrative structure.

=== Abandoning "anti-secrecy" ===
In 1879, Delta Upsilon formally disavowed its policy of anti-secrecy, instead adopting a program of what it described as "non-secrecy". According to Delta Upsilon, the reason for this change was that it had been absolutely victorious in its battle against secrecy, "the character of the secret societies so altered, that hostility toward them decreased".

This explanation has been more skeptically received by some, with one period observer caustically noting that Delta Upsilon "reveals very little more of what it does than the latter [secret fraternities]". Others commented that chapter meetings were closed to all but initiated members and the fraternity was now practicing selective pledging and initiation, in contrast to its earliest days at Williams. Therefore, it was proffered that the description of the fraternity as a "private" society rather than a "non-secret" one might be more accurate. The Harvard Crimson, meanwhile, poetically attributed the official change of position as due to "the sheer exhaustion of those that heretofore have maintained a vigorous tilt at the windmill for exercise's sake, on finding that the windmill stands the attack much better than they". Writing in 2013, Benjamin Wurgraft of the New School for Social Research commented that Delta Upsilon's changes made it "nothing more than another fraternity—a rival for pledges rather than a force for unity".

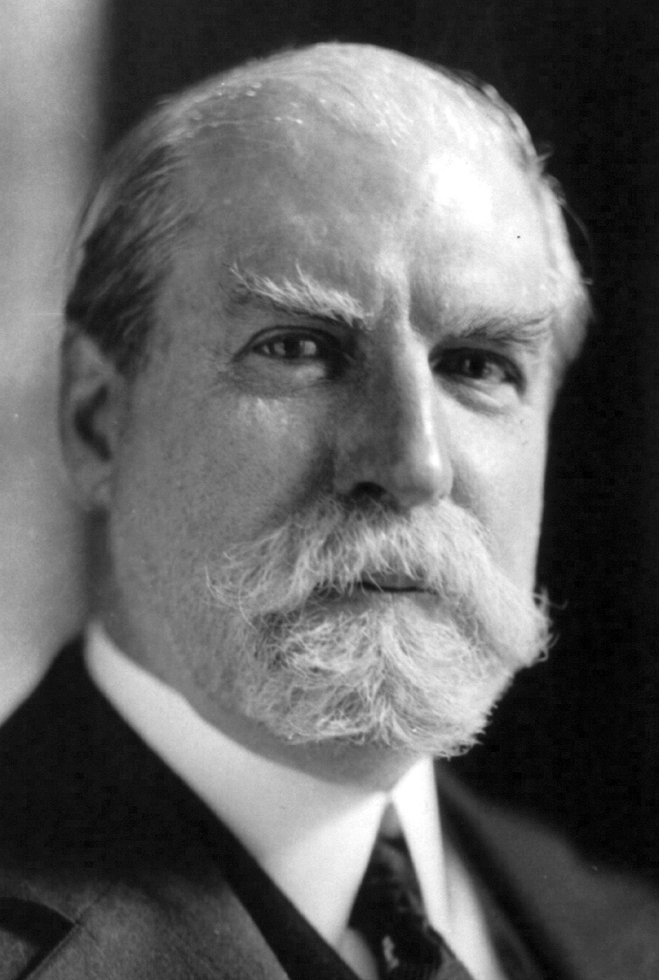
Chief Justice of the United States Charles Evans Hughes served as president of Delta Upsilon and oversaw its incorporation.

=== 20th century ===
Delta Upsilon members from the University of Washington chapter attend a rush party aboard the SS Tacoma in 1916.

At the turn of the century, the fraternity's growth plateaued due, in part, to opposition from a group of chapters to what was seen as the lessening of the fraternity's standards through colonization. In 1898, Delta Upsilon joined the recent trend of fraternity expansion into Canada by chartering a chapter at McGill University in Montreal. However, most expansion in this period came in the form of the annexation of established local fraternities. Zeta Chi at Baker University was one local which unsuccessfully petitioned for annexation by Delta Upsilon. In 1909, Charles Evans Hughes led the incorporation of the fraternity.

By 1920, the fraternity had grown to 44 chapters. Gen. John Arthur Clark, the celebrated former commander of the Seaforth Highlanders and a Member of Parliament from Vancouver, was elevated to "international president", the fraternity's penultimate office, in 1944, holding it for three consecutive terms. Clark became the first Canadian to hold the Delta Upsilon presidency.

In the 1950s, former Delta Upsilon international president Horace G. Nichol served as president of the North American Interfraternity Conference (NIC). He was recognized for his work leading the NIC with the NIC Gold Medal in 1959.

The turbulence the Greek system experienced in the mid-20th century began for Delta Upsilon in 1956. That year's sitting of the Undergraduate Convention was dissolved by emergency action of DU leadership to "prevent open dissension" in the wake of the election of an African-American as president of the Brown University chapter. The election had been denounced by a number of the fraternity's new southern chapters.

Similarly in 1951, the local chapter at Bowdoin College was suspended by the national body for admitting a black member, Theophilus McKinney Jr. US senator Paul Douglas urged the local chapter not to back down and the university chapter later withdrew from the national fraternity.

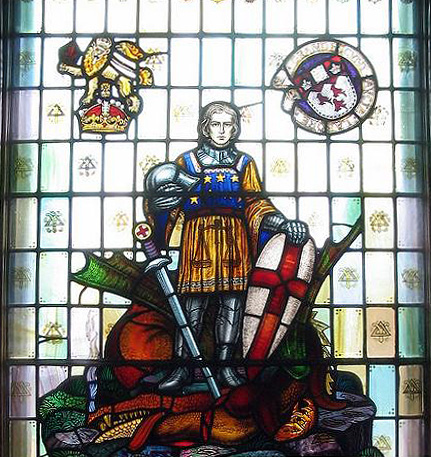
Stained glass at McGill University's Redpath Library shows St. George coated in the tabard of Delta Upsilon. It commemorates 23 McGill members of Delta Upsilon killed in World War I.

By 1986, Delta Upsilon had 88 active chapters, increasing to a high of 92 in 1991. During the 1990s chapters at Rutgers University, Cornell University, Oklahoma State University, the University of Nebraska–Lincoln and Union College were closed or placed on probation after it was revealed pledges at those houses had been branded, paddled, and forced to eat garbage, among other things.

=== 21st century ===
Beginning in 2009, the Fraternity implemented a series of changes that radically reshaped the organization. The fraternity closed a quarter of its chapters for poor performance, including risky behaviors, poor grades, and weak service records. Then it opened a similar number of new chapters under the close guidance of the national organization. The fraternity doubled its staff, from 11 to 22, and added new employees with advanced degrees in higher education or nonprofit management. The fraternity placed an emphasis on the number of members attending educational programming, including international service work, and today more than half of undergraduate members participate in at least one educational program per year. Among the chapters targeted for closure was one of the fraternity's longest enduring chapters, the 120-year-old Technology chapter at the Massachusetts Institute of Technology. Though the shuttering of the Technology chapter was for what fraternity officials would only describe as inappropriate behavior, The Tech reported an investigation by Delta Upsilon had allegedly uncovered a prohibited "secret ritual" that had been performed by the chapter for the preceding 70 years. Officers of the Technology chapter, which one account described as having a "growing distance from [the] international fraternity", rejected the charges, though acknowledged they had effectively stopped participating in the fraternity's programs. In denying an appeal for restoration of the chapter, Delta Upsilon headquarters explained that they had "been working in coordination with university staff" but had been unable to reach a solution by which the chapter could continue at MIT.

On March 28, 2009, Delta Upsilon established its 152nd chapter, and the second of the 21st century, at Webster University in St. Louis, Missouri. The initiation was significant as it was the first time in more than a century that Delta Upsilon established a chapter at a school where no previous fraternities and sororities existed.

=== Secessionist chapters ===
==== University of Vermont ====
In 1854, the University of Vermont chapter, which was named Delta Psi, severed its connections with the Anti-Secret Confederation. The cause of separation is lost to history, with Delta Upsilon's own records recording that the exit of Delta Psi was "from causes unknown to us". A Delta Psi historian later claimed the withdrawal was due to the expenses the fraternity was incurring sending delegates to the meetings of the Anti-Secret Confederation. It has also been speculated that Delta Psi felt local pressure in maintaining the A.S.C.'s militant stance against secret ritual; after separating from the A.S.C. it began to undertake secret work. (Delta Upsilon has maintained that it does not consider members of Delta Psi during the period it was affiliated with the A.S.C. to also be members of Delta Upsilon, the separation being so total that the "action removed all its members from membership in the Delta Upsilon fraternity".)

Delta Psi continued as a very successful local fraternity for 150 years after leaving Delta Upsilon. During this period, DU avoided attempts to colonize the University of Vermont. In 2014, ten years after the collapse of Delta Psi, Delta Upsilon entered the Burlington campus for the first time since its split with Delta Psi, chartering a colony.

==== Harvard University ====
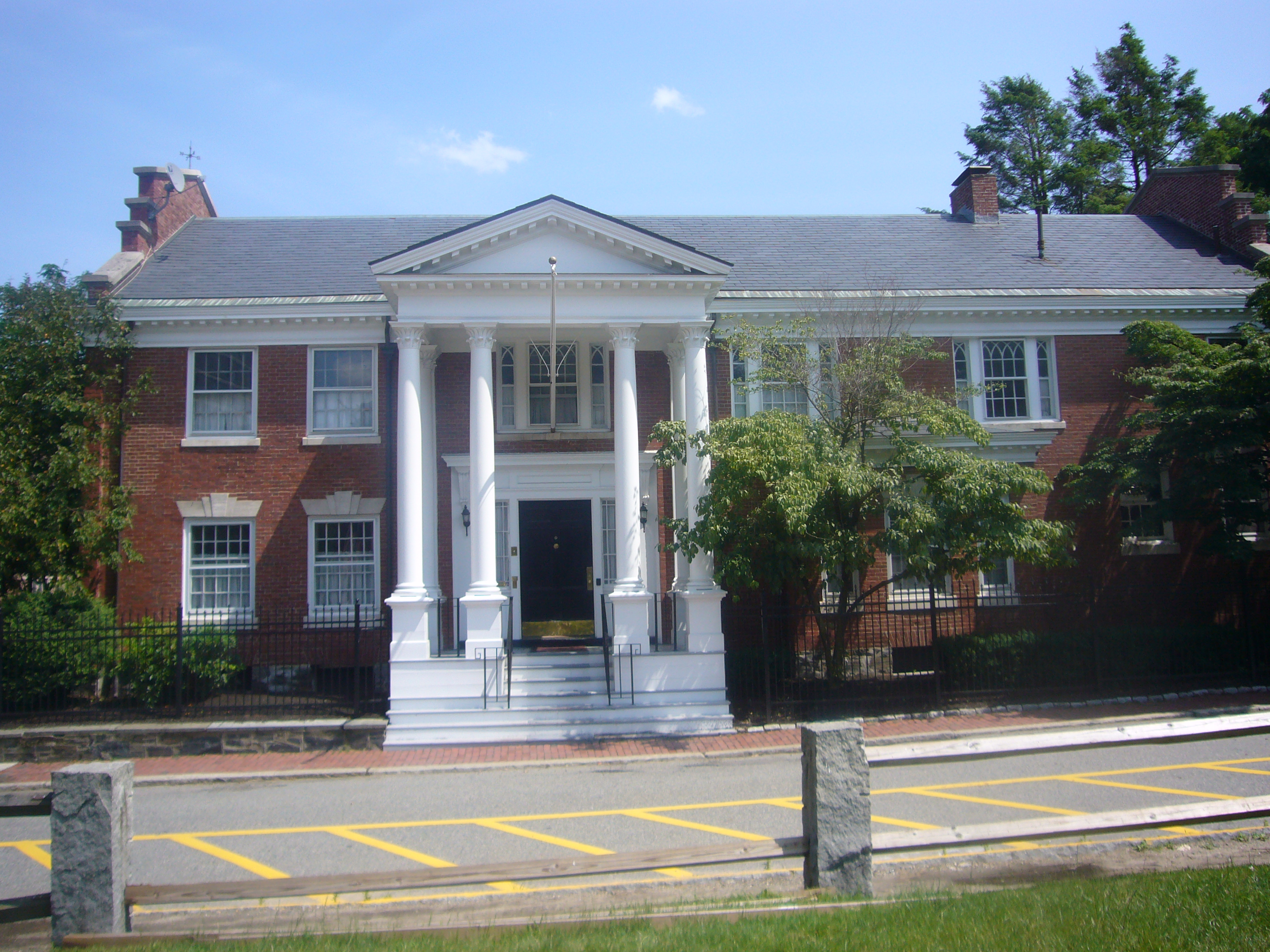
Delta Upsilon's first Harvard chapter revolted, disaffiliated, and ultimately merged with the Fly Club, whose clubhouse is pictured. A more recent colonization attempt also failed.

When the fraternity incorporated in 1909, it adopted a new constitution. The Harvard chapter immediately set forth its views that the new constitution had been illegitimately enacted and had overly vested control in the professional leadership, undermining the ability of the chapters to democratically express themselves. Though several other chapters initially signaled support for the Harvard position, a proposed amendment to the new document failed. In 1915, the Harvard chapter stopped paying dues to the fraternity. A further shot across the bow of the international fraternity came when Harvard requested headquarters stop sending copies of the Delta Upsilon Quarterly because they "littered up the house". Open revolt came when the international fraternity tried to impose discipline on Harvard. Harvard responded by declaring it didn't recognize the authority of DU headquarters, as Delta Upsilon had ceased to exist in 1909. Delta Upsilon sued its rebellious chapter whose leaders included toy heir F.A.O. Schwarz Jr. Following the courtroom triumph of the DU headquarters, it expelled the rebellious members and initiated a hand-picked pledge class to continue the chapter. Its victory was short-lived, though, as the recreated chapter itself voted to disaffiliate from Delta Upsilon. The secessionist group legally reconstituted itself as "the D.U. Club", taking the chapter roll book with them, and existed as a successful finals club for many decades on the Harvard campus. In 1995, the D.U. Club closed after an assault of a football recruit occurred at its clubhouse. The D.U. Club's alumni board voted to merge its alumni with the Fly Club.

After several decades of patient waiting for the D.U. Club to pass, Delta Upsilon chartered yet another chapter at Harvard. The new chapter was installed in 1999, four years after the D.U. Club had merged with the Fly Club. It unraveled faster than its predecessors, however. In 2005, the six-year-old Delta Upsilon chapter voted to disaffiliate from the fraternity. It has continued under the name "Oak Club" and currently claims more than 100 alumni who, it says, embody "many of the original DU principles".

==== Bowdoin College ====
Delta Upsilon's chapter at Bowdoin College disaffiliated in the 1950s, reforming as a local known as Delta Sigma. The decision came after the chapter had admitted a black Bowdoin student as a member and was ordered by DU Headquarters to dismiss him. The chapter chose instead to disaffiliate.

==== Brown University ====
Delta Upsilon's chapter at Brown University, which was organized in 1868, disaffiliated in 1967, reforming as a local known as Kappa Delta Upsilon (so named because it was the tenth chapter of Delta Upsilon and Kappa is the tenth letter of the Greek alphabet). The decision came after a decade of strained relations with the DU headquarters, originating in its decision to declare an emergency and dissolve the 1956 sitting of the Undergraduate Convention, a move it said was necessary to "prevent open dissension". (The preceding year, the Brown DU chapter had elected an African-American as chapter president, causing the fraternity's new southern chapters to threaten a boycott of the convention.)

Almost 20 years later, in 1986, the Brown chapter rejoined Delta Upsilon. Terry Bullock, then Delta Upsilon international president, wrote of the return of Brown that "there is no greater joy than the reconciliation of a family estranged for many years". The joy was short-lived, however, as the chapter again voted to disaffiliate in 1991, reverting to the name Kappa Delta Upsilon. In 1996 Kappa Delta Upsilon was banned from campus for 5 years due to the circumstances surrounding a fire in its basement. It has yet to reestablish itself.

=== "Four Founding Principles" ===
The Fraternity's Four Founding Principles originated in the Preamble to the early Constitution of the Anti-Secret Confederation. They remained unchanged until the 1891 Convention undertook a complete revision of the Constitution, article-by-article. In the new revision, the old Preamble was completely stricken,n and the following text was added to Article 1, Section 2: "The objects of this Fraternity shall include the promotion of friendship, the exertion of moral influence, the diffusion of liberal culture, and the advancement of equity in college affairs. It shall be non-secret." This version remained with minor changes until around 1923, when the first printed example of the current version was published in that year's edition of the Manual of Delta Upsilon.

The "Four Founding Principles" are currently: the Advancement of Justice, the Promotion of Friendship, the Development of Character, and the Diffusion of Liberal Culture.

== Symbols ==
=== Badge ===
An illustrated representation of the badge, which also forms part of the crest of the arms

The current Delta Upsilon badge was submitted to the fraternity's 1858 convention by a "badge committee", chaired by Edward Gardner. It features the Greek letter Delta superimposed on an Upsilon. The arms of the Upsilon each have a word of the Fraternity motto engraved on them in Greek letters, the left arm Δικαια, the right arm Υποθηκη.

The Associate Member Pin, also known as the Pledge Pin, consists of a gold Delta on blue enamel with a gold Upsilon in the center.

=== Coat of arms ===
The coat of arms were assumed following incorporation.

It is blazoned as Or, a balanced scale proper on a chief Azure, seven mullets of the first, four, and three. The crest is a monogram of the Greek letter Delta surcharged upon the letter Upsilon bearing the motto in Greek letters between two scrolls, the dexter charged with the number "1834", the sinister charged with the number "1909". The supporters are the heraldic banners of the arms of the Undergraduate Convention (Or, an oak tree proper on a mount in base Vert, on a chief Azure annulets (in fesse) co-joined) and the arms of the Assembly of Trustees (Azure, a chevron between five coronets, Or two, one and two).

=== Colors ===
The colors of the Fraternity were approved as "Old Gold and Sapphire Blue" by the 1881 Convention. In 1866, the Convention first adopted "Chrome and Blue" as the official colors. These were altered to simply "Gold and Blue" in 1879, before taking on their current form in 1881.

=== Flag ===
The current version of the Fraternity Flag was established in 1911 and consists of three vertical bars, blue, gold, and blue. The gold section is charged with the fraternity's badge. A flag of a solid gold field charged with a visual representation of the pledge pin is used by colonies.

A Delta Upsilon member wearing the fraternity ribbon with badge

=== Hat band ===
The fraternity's bylaws formerly prescribed a puggaree to band a boater hat that is black silk with the middle third occupied by alternating stripes of gold, blue, and gold. The hat band was initially only sold through the head office; however, in 1922 Delta Upsilon began licensing a small number of hatter shops, primarily in Manhattan and New England, to produce and sell the puggaree for $1 if the customer first displayed their badge to the clerk as a mark of identification.

=== Motto ===
The Fraternity's motto is "Dikaia Hypothēkē," which the fraternity translates from Ancient Greek—"Δικαια Ὑποθήκη"—to mean "Justice, Our Foundation". The motto was adopted in 1858. Until this time, the motto of the Williams Chapter, "Ouden Adelon", meaning "Nothing Secret", was used.

=== Ribbon ===
The design of the ribbon is similar to the interior stripes of the hat band, but with colors reversed. It is 36 inches in length with open ends, designed to be crossed and fastened by the badge.

=== Seal ===
The seal of the fraternity, which is in the custody of the international headquarters in Indianapolis, is affixed to chapter charters and membership certificates. It is described in the fraternity's constitution as the shield of the coat of arms set in a circular band on which is inscribed "Delta Upsilon Fraternity 1834–1909".

=== Songs ===
Cover of the sheet music to the 1896 publishing of the Delta Upsilon March

melody to Hail, Delta Upsilon

The fraternity hymn is "Hail, Delta Upsilon".

Hail, Delta Upsilon! Brotherhood glorious!

Justice thy cornerstone, true manhood thy goal!

O'er all thine enemies, forever victorious,

Hail, Delta Upsilon, eternal soul!

Reared in adversity, so shalt thou never.

Let from thy altars die the life-giving flame;

Hands gripped in loving clasp, all brothers forever,

Each to the other true, and ever the same.

The "Delta Upsilon Ode" is also used for special occasions; its melody and lyrics were penned by Edward La Wall Seip of Delta Upsilon's Lafayette College chapter.

"Tis the Plan of Delta U" by John Briggs and Joel Slocum, from the fraternity's University of Rochester and Colby College chapters respectively, tells of the expansion of Delta Upsilon into Canada (poetically termed "Our Lady of the Snows"), leading to the hearts of Americans and Canadians being "linked together at the shrine of Delta U".

The traditional air "Down Among the Dead Men" is used as a toasting song at formal dinners with slightly modified lyrics penned by Joyce Kilmer in which those who deny the ritual toast to "our beloved Delta U" are condemned to lie "down among the dead men".

The "Delta Upsilon Sweetheart Song" is a courting song used in different ways by different chapters. At Ohio University, for instance, it is performed at the chapter's spring cotillion, and it has also been played at the weddings of members.

A more extensive volume of fraternity songs is indexed in the fraternity's songbook Songs My Brothers Taught Me.

== Organization ==
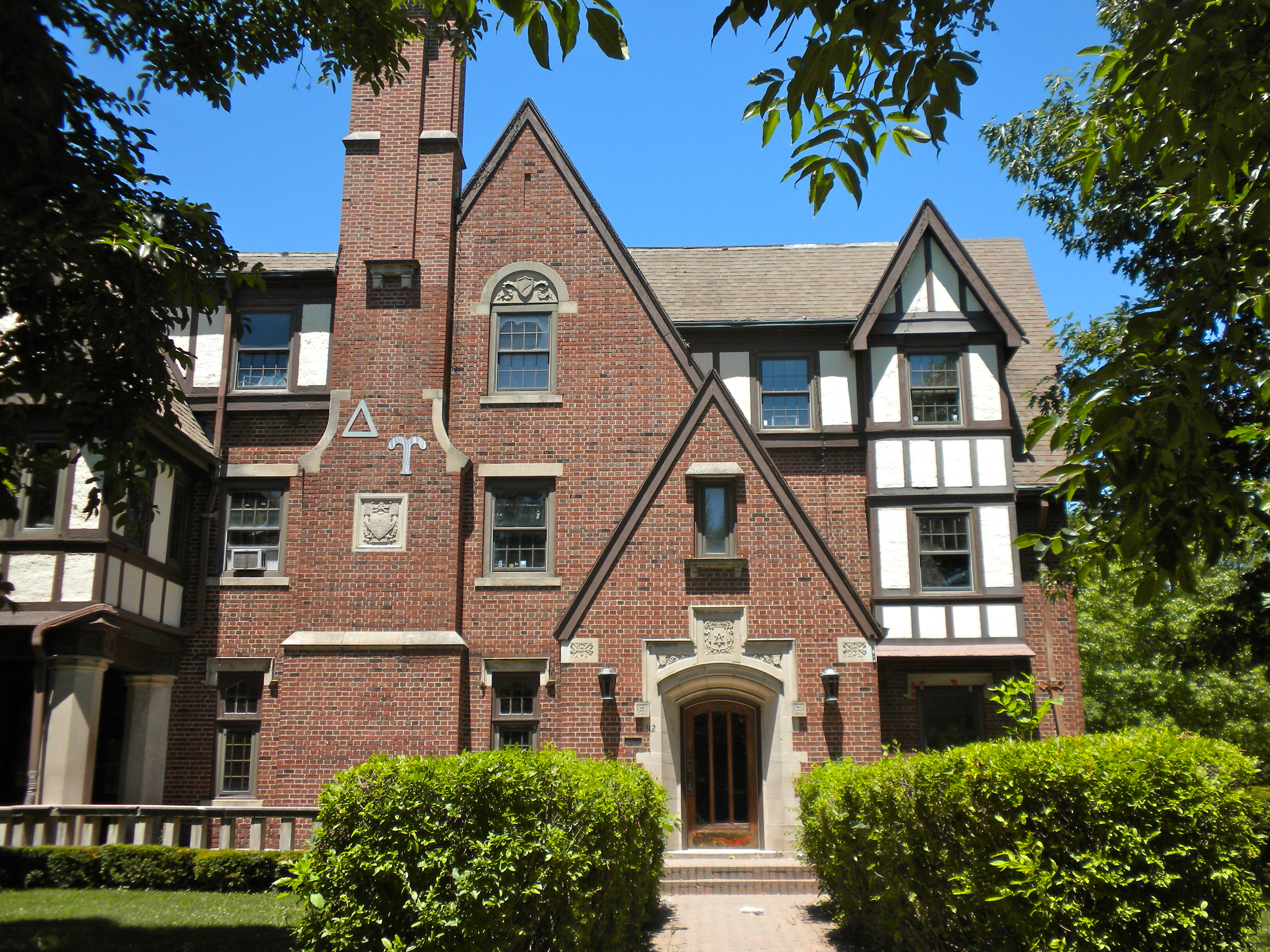
The University of Illinois Delta Upsilon house is listed on the National Register of Historic Places.

=== Chapters ===
Delta Upsilon is currently organized into 68 active chapters, of which four are in Canada and the remainder in the United States. The United States chapters are divided into five provinces, each overseen by a governor appointed by the international president. The Canadian chapters are grouped into what the fraternity calls "the Canadian conference". Chapters are named after the school at which they are sited, with the exception of the now-defunct City College of New York chapter, which was called the Manhattan chapter.

This map shows the expansion of active undergraduate chapters of Delta Upsilon from 1834 to 2014 in the United States (Canada not reflected here).

=== Governance ===
The Undergraduate Convention and the Assembly of Trustees meet annually. They form the bicameral legislature of the fraternity and make, repeal, and adopt fraternity law. An indirectly elected board oversees the operations of the fraternity between meetings of the two chambers and hires an executive director who manages the full-time secretariat which, according to the fraternity, currently employs 21 persons.

=== Headquarters ===
The Butler Memorial Headquarters Building is located in Indianapolis, Indiana. Completed in 1971, it is located on a road with eight other fraternity and sorority headquarters (before this, the fraternity was headquartered in New York City). The building was financed with a bequest from Lester E. Cox, a University of Pennsylvania chapter alumnus who left half his estate to the fraternity. It is named in honor of Wilford A. Butler, who served as the fraternity's executive director from 1963 to 1987.

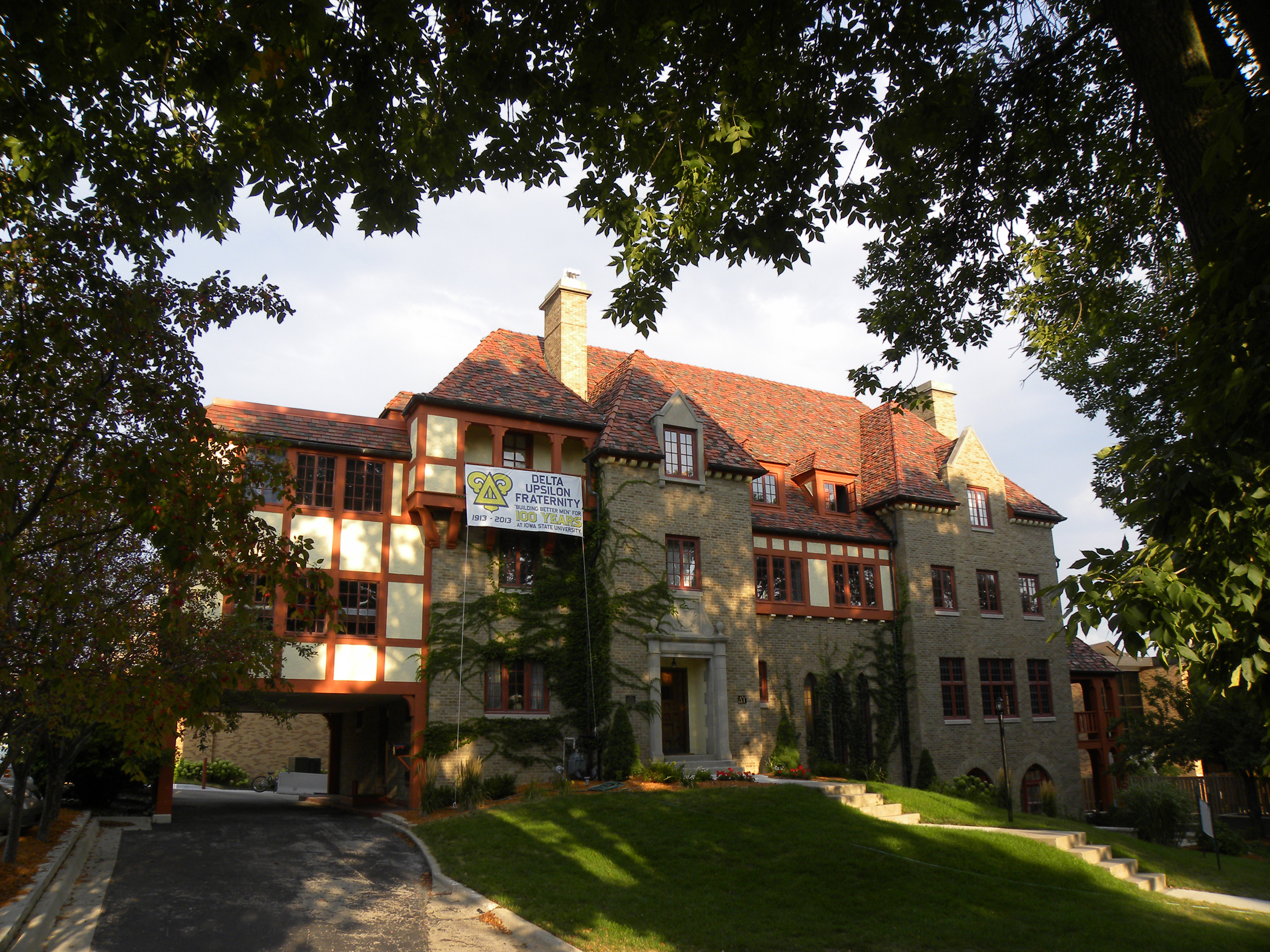
The chapter house of the Iowa State University chapter of Delta Upsilon is listed on the National Register of Historic Places.

In the headquarters building is a display of all Time magazine covers on which Delta Upsilon members have appeared. According to the fraternity, the reproduction of early covers of the magazine was authorized by Time editor-in-chief Hedley Donovan, a member of Delta Upsilon's University of Minnesota chapter.

The fraternity's headquarters stores its archives and records from 1942 to the present. Older records are in the custody of the Manuscripts and Archives Division of the New York Public Library.

=== Publications ===
The Delta Upsilon Quarterly began publication in 1882 as the fraternity's official magazine. In 1906 the Alpha Tau Omega Palm declared it was, among all fraternity journals, second in quality only to the Kappa Sigma Caduceus.

The Cornerstone: Delta Upsilon's Guide to College and Beyond is the fraternity's membership manual. It includes not only information on the history and principles of the fraternity, but also guidelines on dress, speech, manners, and formal etiquette.

== Notable members ==
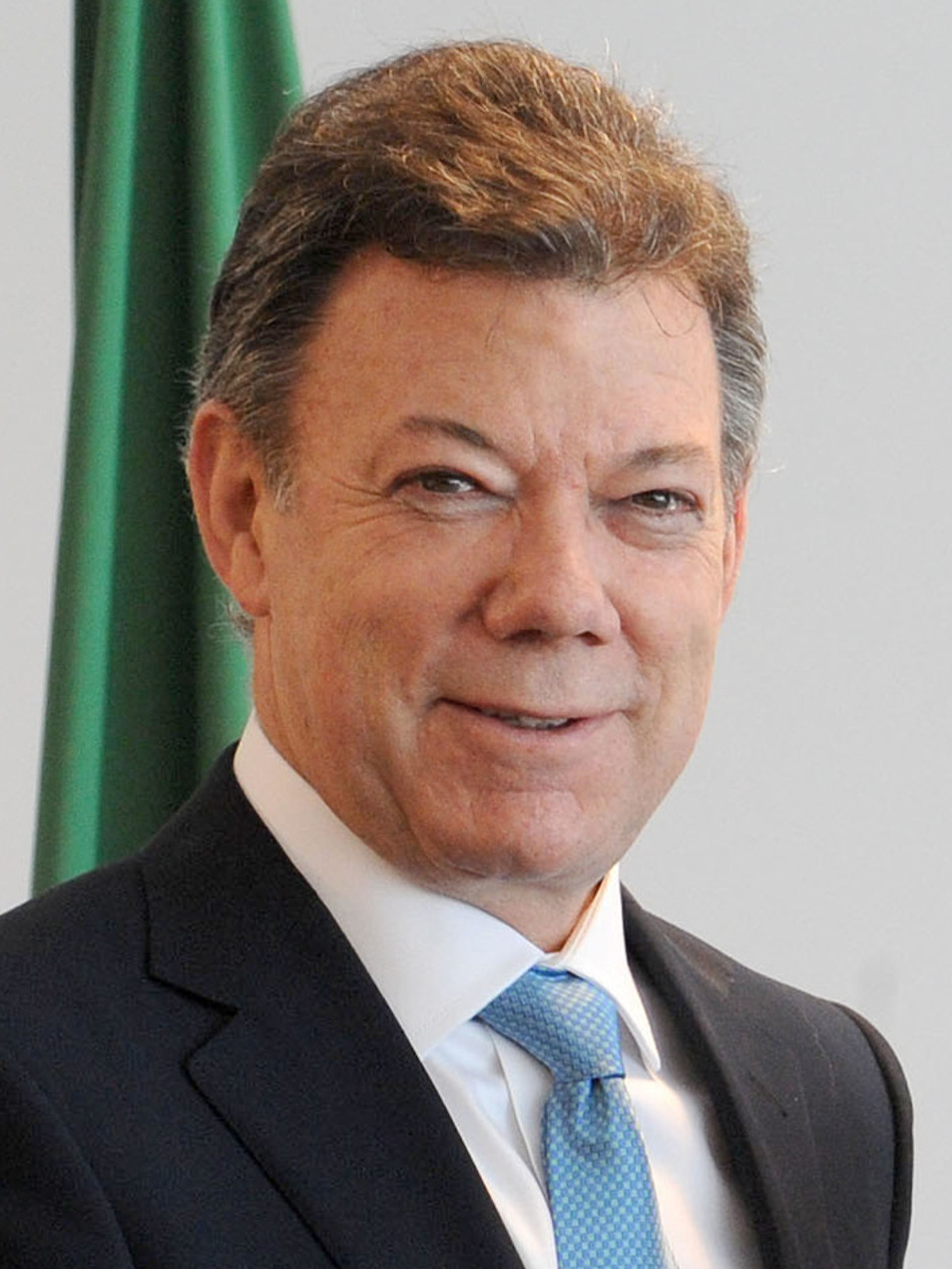
Former President of Colombia Juan Manuel Santos Calderón, is a Delta Upsilon member from the fraternity's University of Kansas chapter.

The fraternity's membership roster includes United States President James A. Garfield (Williams 1856), Chief Justice of the United States Supreme Court Charles Evans Hughes (Colgate and Brown 1881), United States Senator-Vermont Justin S. Morrill (Middlebury 1860), former Commander in Chief of the US Central Command Tommy Franks (Texas 1963), author Stephen Crane (Lafayette and Syracuse 1894), author Kurt Vonnegut Jr. (Cornell 1944), former chairman and CEO of Walt Disney Co. Michael D. Eisner (Denison 1964), and Nobel Prize recipients Charles Dawes (Marietta 1884), Christian B. Anfinsen (Swarthmore 1937), and Edward C. Prescott (Swarthmore 1962).

Notable Canadian DUs include Prime Minister and Nobel Prize recipient Lester B. Pearson (Toronto 1919), actor Alan Thicke (Western Ontario 1967), Alberta premier E. Peter Lougheed (Alberta 1959), Ontario premier John P. Robarts (Western Ontario 1939), and Minister of Foreign Affairs David Emerson (Alberta 1964).

The former President of Colombia, Juan Manuel Santos Calderón (Kansas 1973), was initiated into Delta Upsilon as an undergraduate student at the University of Kansas and credits the fraternity in helping form his political ideals.

Delta Upsilon member Linus Pauling (Oregon State 1922) is a member of a small group of individuals who have been awarded more than one Nobel Prize. Two Delta Upsilon fraternity members, Alfred P. Sloan (Technology 1895) and Charles F. Kettering (Ohio State 1904), joined together in 1945 to found the Sloan-Kettering Institute, which is now part of the world's oldest and largest private cancer research facility, the Memorial Sloan-Kettering Cancer Center.

Another Delta Upsilon member, Thomas Rowe Price, Jr. (Swarthmore 1919) popularized growth stock investing and founded the multibillion-dollar investment firm T. Rowe Price, based in Baltimore, Maryland.

== Member misconduct ==
In 2018, the chapter of Delta Upsilon at the University of Washington in Seattle had its charter revoked for beating pledges and forcing them into servitude of senior undergraduate members. The charter revocation followed its earlier suspension from the university's interfraternity council.

In April 2019, a document was anonymously leaked containing unofficial "minutes" written by members of the Swarthmore College local Phi Psi fraternity between 2013 and 2016. These documents revealed discussions of fraternity activities using racist, sexist, and homophobic language, as well as language condoning sexual assault. These documents also contained the labeling, by the local Phi Psi chapter, of parts of Swarthmore College's Delta Upsilon fraternity house as a "rape attic" and a "rape tunnel". This sparked student activism that led to the voluntary disbandment by unanimous vote of both fraternities shortly thereafter.

In August 2026, members of the chapter at the Pennsylvania State University were charged by Pennsylvania Attorney General Dave Sunday with felony corrupt organizations, conspiracy, dealing in proceeds of unlawful activity, and related offenses in connection with a cocaine-trafficking operation. As of August 17, 2026, the chapter has been placed on interim suspension by the university.

== In popular culture ==
- In 1932, one of the final performances of Coon-Sanders Original Nighthawk Orchestra was at a party organized by the Washington and Lee University chapter of Delta Upsilon.
- Kurt Vonnegut's 1963 Hugo Award–nominated novel Cat's Cradle opens with narrator Jonah recalling he had read in the Delta Upsilon Quarterly that main character Newton Hoenikker, who controls the last crystals of the doomsday compound ice-nine, had recently pledged to the Cornell University chapter of Delta Upsilon (it is later learned that Hoenikker has been de-pledged for poor grades).
- Noel Stookey ("Paul" of Peter, Paul and Mary) was introduced to Jim Mosby—Peter, Paul and Mary's early manager—by Mary Hewes, who had, herself, met Stookey at a party at the Delta Upsilon chapter at Michigan State University, where Stookey was a member.
- According to campus newspaper The Bucknellian, the game of beer pong was invented at Bucknell University's Delta Upsilon chapter in the 1970s.
- In 2006 Playboy staged a photo shoot at the University of Wisconsin Delta Upsilon chapter. The photo, which ran in the May 2006 issue of the magazine, featured 23 Delta Upsilon members posing with 19 naked females in an article naming Wisconsin the nation's "#1 party school".
- The 2010 season of Canada's Worst Handyman was set at the Delta Upsilon chapter house at the University of Western Ontario, described as "a frat house condemned by the city after a century as London's most prestigious fraternity". The house was reoccupied by Delta Upsilon following the end of filming. Ratings for the season were higher than any other non-sports show on a specialty channel airing on the same day.

== See also ==
- List of social fraternities
