= Carver College (Charlotte, North Carolina) =

Former junior college in North Carolina, US

Carver College (later known as Mecklenburg College) was a junior college that served African American students in Charlotte, North Carolina. The college operated as the black counterpart to Charlotte College (now the University of North Carolina at Charlotte) from 1949 to 1963. After merging with the Central Industrial Education Center, the school became Central Piedmont Community College.

== History ==
=== 1940–1960 ===
Carver College emerged from the demands for higher education among World War II veterans in the 1940s. As soldiers returned stateside, they sought to take advantage of the Servicemen's Readjustment Act of 1944 (G.I. Bill). Across the United States, newly established college centers met growing educational demands. These centers allowed veterans to gain skills and transferable credit for four-year universities. In North Carolina, the Extension Division of the University of North Carolina at Chapel Hill assumed responsibility for the college centers. The Charlotte Center of the University of North Carolina (later Charlotte College) operated out of the all-white Central High School. Second Ward High School, the first public high school for African Americans in the Charlotte-Mecklenburg area, hosted an extension school for African American students. The Charlotte School Board gained administrative power over Charlotte College after the passage of Chapter 786 by the North Carolina General Assembly in April 1949. After the NC General Assembly authorized the Charlotte City School Board to administer the community college system in Charlotte, the school board turned its attention to creating a junior college to serve African Americans. The board named the new college Carver in honor of George Washington Carver. Carver College began in September 1949 with 62 students at Second Ward High School under the directorship of Vernon A. Buck Jr.

Before the creation of this junior college, Johnson C. Smith University (JCSU) served the educational needs of black students in Charlotte. The formation of Carver College expanded the opportunities for local African Americans and made college education more accessible. Several Carver College graduates transferred to JCSU to continue their education.

The Charlotte Board of Education created an all-black counterpart to Charlotte College for several reasons. In the mid-twentieth century, southern society operated under Jim Crow. Racial segregation and the notion of "separate, but equal" initiated the creation of separate schools and other public facilities for black and white children. This separation of blacks and whites continued in institutions of higher learning. The pivotal Brown v. Board of Education of Topeka case, which ruled against the constitutionality of "separate, but equal" educational facilities, did not pass until 1954. Even after the ruling, North Carolina schools did not fully integrate until 1971. Bonnie Cone—director of Charlotte Center and president of Charlotte College—suggested another reason for the creation of Carver College. In an oral history interview from 1988, she indicated that the legislation passed by the General Assembly in April 1949 allowed for the board to offer affordable education to black veterans.

Carver College offered five curricula: Liberal Arts and Business Administration University Parallel, Business Administration and Secretarial Science, Accelerated High School, Cosmetology, and Adult Education. The Liberal Arts and Business Administration University Parallel was intended for students who planned to transfer to a senior college. Students that wanted to gain training in a specific field and enter employment enrolled in the Business Administration and Secretarial Science track. Carver also provided vocational training in auto mechanics, brick masonry, and shoe repairing. Typing, dressmaking, home planning, and interiors were some courses offered in the adult education program. The college no longer offered an accelerated high school program, nor cosmetology courses, by 1961. The passage of the Community College Act of 1957 placed Carver College under the control of the Charlotte Community College System.

The Trustees selected land off Highway 85 and on Beatties Ford Road to relocate the Carver's new campus. The positioning of the campus on Beatties Ford Road placed the college near historic African American neighborhoods and business districts in Charlotte.

=== 1960–1963 ===
In June 1956, the Charlotte Chamber of Commerce endorsed a plan to build Carver and Charlotte Colleges their own facilities. The decision marked a major turning point for both colleges as they progressed beyond their original high school locations. The Trustees of the Charlotte Community College System selected J.N. Pease and Company as the architects for Carver College in 1958. With the decision to build new campuses for both colleges, Charlotte, business leaders, and Mecklenburg legislators aided in the acquisition of land and funding. The Board of Trustees used a mixture of state and county bonds to finance the construction. As the Board of Trustees made plans to build new facilities for Carver and Charlotte Colleges, the board faced complaints about the operation of dual colleges. The National Association for the Advancement of Colored People (NAACP) and Mecklenburg Council on Human Relations argued separate colleges created two second-rate institutions that would struggle for sufficient funding. In contrast, the Board of Trustees argued that attempts to integrate would curtail white student enrollment and "decimate" the black student body. The new campus for Carver College was in West Charlotte, and the board feared students near Carver would not want to attend Charlotte College since it was located across the county.

In 1961, Roy S. Wynn and James D. Martin sued the Trustees of the Charlotte Community College System on behalf of themselves and other taxpayers in Mecklenburg County. Wynn and Martin argued that the construction of Carver College and Charlotte College would be a wasteful duplication, and would violate the Brown v. Board of Education decision in 1954. However, the Supreme Court of North Carolina ruled against Wynn and Martin. They cited that no constitutional rights of the plaintiffs had been denied and that any qualified prospective student had not been excluded from attending either Charlotte College or Carver College solely based on race.

=== 1963–Present ===
After a request by Carver faculty and students to change their name, the Board of Trustees approved the college's new name in 1961. Thus, Carver College became Mecklenburg College. In 1963, Mecklenburg College merged with the all-white Central Industrial Education Center to create Central Piedmont Community College (CPCC). The merger occurred after the passage of the State Community College Act of 1963. CPCC President Richard Hagemeyer and the new administration brought over roughly fifteen African American teachers to serve as faculty for Central Piedmont during the merge. By 1964, enrollment at the Mecklenburg College campus had declined to roughly eighty-six students, and administration suspended daytime operations to the campus. Two factors influenced the closure of Mecklenburg College. The Central Piedmont governing board desired a centralized campus at the Elizabeth Avenue location. The other reason resulted from the effects of integrating Mecklenburg College and the Central Industrial Center. After the integration in 1963, African American students flocked to the formerly all-white campus at the old Central High School.

Today, Central Piedmont Community College and UNC Charlotte continue to be connected through the 49erNext and the UNC Charlotte passport program. 49erNext guarantees admission to UNC Charlotte to complete a bachelor's degree after a student obtained an associate degree from Central Piedmont. The UNC Charlotte passport program is a one-year, invitation-only program for first-time college students that enables dual academic advising from both UNC Charlotte and Central Piedmont.
