= List of Tuck School alumni =

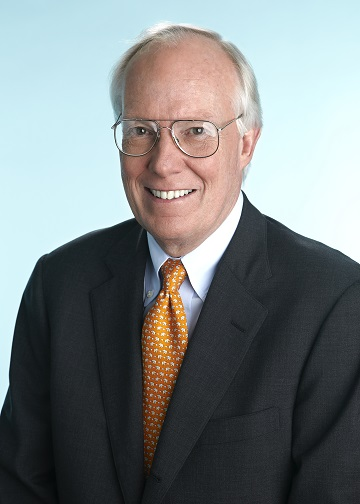
Christopher A. Sinclair, Executive Chairman and former CEO of Mattel, Inc., and former chairman and CEO of Pepsi-Cola, earned an MBA from Tuck.

The Tuck School of Dartmouth College has approximately 10,300 living alumni globally. This is a list of notable Tuck School alumni.

This list uses the following notation:

- D or unmarked years – recipient of Dartmouth College Bachelor of Arts
- DMS – recipient of Dartmouth Medical School degree (Bachelor of Medicine 1797–1812, Doctor of Medicine 1812–present)
- Th – recipient of any of several Thayer School of Engineering degrees (see Thayer School of Engineering#Academics)
- T – recipient of Tuck School of Business Master of Business Administration, or graduate of other programs as indicated
- M.A., M.A.L.S., M.S., Ph.D, etc. – recipient of indicated degree from an Arts and Sciences graduate program, or the historical equivalent

== Industry ==
Name	Year/degree	Notability	Reference
Elyse Allan	D'1979, T'1984	President and CEO of GE Canada; Vice President of General Electric	
C. Michael Armstrong	T'1976 (Advanced Management Program)	CEO and chairman of AT&T	
John Bello	T'1974	Founder and former CEO of SoBe	
Peter R. Dolan	T'1980	Chairman and CEO of Bristol-Myers Squibb	
Sarah Irving	D'2010, T'2014	Executive Vice President and Chief Brand Officer of Irving Oil	
Roger Lynch	T'1995	CEO of Pandora Radio, former CEO of Sling TV	
Kevin McGrath	T'1977	CEO of Digital Angel	
Janet L. Robinson	T'1996 (Executive Education Program)	President and CEO of the New York Times Company	
Steven Rogel	T (Executive Education Program)	CEO of Weyerhaeuser	

== Finance ==
Name	Year/degree	Notability	Reference
Edward Tuck	D'1862	Partner, John Munroe & Co.; Endowed Tuck School of Business in 1899	
Roger McNamee	T'1982	Founding partner of venture capital firm Elevation Partners Founding partner of private equity firm Silver Lake Partners	
Don M. Wilson III	T'1973	Chief Risk Officer of JPMorgan Chase 2003–2006	
Rick Wurster		CEO and president of charles schwab	

- John P. Costas (born 1957), American businessman, banker, and trader

== Technology ==
Name	Year/degree	Notability	Reference
Jack Herrick	T'1997	Founder of WikiHow and eHow	

== Government, law and nonprofit ==
Name	Year/degree	Notability	Reference
Anthony M. Frank	D'1953, T'1954	United States Postmaster General 1988–1992	
Tina Smith	T'1984	Senator from Minnesota 2018–Present	
Allen E. Ertel	Th'1958, T'1959	Representative from Pennsylvania 1977–1983	
Herman T. Schneebeli	D'1930, T'1931	Representative from Pennsylvania 1960–1977	
Colin Kenny	T'1968	Senator from Ontario, Canada 1984–2018	

== Academia ==
Name	Year/degree	Notability	Reference
David T. McLaughlin	D'1954, T'1955	14th President of Dartmouth College 1981–1987	
Robert Witt	T'1965	Chancellor of the University of Alabama System 2012–present; president of the University of Alabama 2003–2012	
Robert A. Jarrow	T'1976	Professor of investment management at the Samuel Curtis Johnson Graduate School of Management at Cornell University	
David R. Brown	D'1967, T Executive	President of Art Center College of Design from 1985 to 1999	

== See also ==
- Category:Dartmouth College alumni
