= Elisa Rush Port =

American surgery professor

Elisa Rush Port FACS
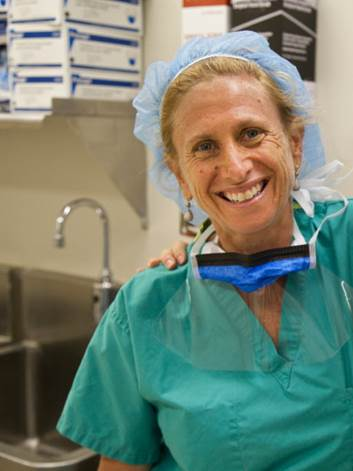
- Born: New York City
- Education: Dartmouth College; University of California; Mount Sinai School of Medicine
- Years active: 1992 - present
- Known for: Chief, Breast Surgery at the Icahn School of Medicine at Mount Sinai, author of The New Generation Breast Cancer Book: How to Navigate Your Diagnosis and Treatment Options-and Remain Optimistic-in an Age of Information Overload
- Spouse: Jeffrey L. Port
- Children: 2
- Medical career
- Profession: Surgical oncology
- Institutions: Cedars-Sinai Medical Center, Los Angeles; Memorial Sloan Kettering Cancer Center, New York; Mount Sinai School of Medicine, New York City; Weill Cornell Medical College, Cornell University Surgery; Memorial Hospital for Cancer and Allied Diseases, New York City; Long Island Jewish Medical Center, New Hyde Park, New York
- Sub-specialties: Breast cancer
- Research: Triple negative breast cancer, Sentinel node diagnostics
- Website: www.mountsinai.org/profiles/elisa-r-port

Elisa Rush Port is an American surgeon who is Associate Professor of Surgery at the Icahn School of Medicine at Mount Sinai Hospital, as well as cofounder and director of the Dubin Breast Center at the Tisch Cancer Institute at Mount Sinai Health System, since 2010. She has received four research grants, has served as an investigator or co-investigator on 15 clinical trials, published 44 peer-reviewed articles, and published a total of 12 book chapters and books. She has specialized in sentinel-node biopsy, a diagnostic method that determines cancer stages based on spread to regional lymph nodes, nipple sparing mastectomy, and the use of MRI for breast cancer.

== Biography ==
Port was born in New York City and grew up in San Diego, majored in French and Spanish at Dartmouth College (1986), received her MD at Mount Sinai School of Medicine (1992), performed an internship at Cedars-Sinai Medical Center, general surgery residencies at Cedars-Sinai Medical Center and Long Island Jewish Medical Center, and a research fellowship at Memorial Sloan Kettering Cancer Center (1994-1996), where she was a staff breast cancer surgeon from 1999 to 2010. In 2010 she co-founded the Dubin Breast Center at Mount Sinai.

She is among a group of surgical oncologists like Laura J. Esserman, who challenges the one-size-fits-all approach to treatment. In a 2015 New York Times profile, Esserman's approach to screening and when and how it should be applied to those at risk for breast cancer was framed as being slow to receive acceptance in the medical community. Esserman is not without supporters and researchers like Port, who was quoted in the same article: "Laura is one of the people who's actively engaged in research in this area and will help us push the field forward to determine whether or not there is a group of people for whom surveillance will be appropriate."

This approach to diagnostics and treatment is highlighted in Port's The New Generation Breast Cancer Book.

Port is frequently sourced in media, including NPR, The New York Times, television news networks, and digital and print magazines.

She is married to Jeffrey L. Port, a thoracic surgeon at Weill Cornell Medicine/NewYork–Presbyterian Hospital. They have two children.

== Research ==
Port has published a large body of work on sentinel-node diagnostics, used to determine a patient's cancer stage, and researched PET scanning for pre-operative assessment of breast cancer. She conducted a Phase I study, in collaboration with Andrew Jess Dannenberg and Clifford Hudis at Memorial Sloan Kettering Cancer Center, on the inhibition of the enzymes COX-2 and aromatase in breast cancer and mechanisms of its drug resistance.

Port's current research work involves a collaboration with Hanna Irie on triple negative breast cancer. Their work is aimed at better understanding and treatments of triple negative breast cancer and mechanisms of its drug resistance.

Other recent work addresses the benefits of screening mammography. With collaborators, the work has shown that patients who undergo mammograms are less likely to require more aggressive surgical or medical treatments as a result of early detection.

She has been a vocal critic of the current United States Preventive Services Task Force guideline that now classifies mammograms as optional for women between 40 and 49 years of age. According to Julie Margenthaler, a breast surgeon with the Washington University School of Medicine and Chair of the ASBrS Communication Committee, the controversy appears to be a result of conflicting data from studies, as well as a focus on incidence rates, possibly without placing equal value on the stage of a patient's cancer when first diagnosed. Regarding this debate, Port co-authored a New York Times op-ed titled "Why the Annual Mammogram Matters".

Port's funding has come in part from the Susan G. Komen Breast Cancer Foundation, the Breast Cancer Research Foundation, a Breast Cancer Alliance Exceptional Project Grant, and the National Institutes of Health.

== Professional affiliations ==
- American Society of Breast Diseases, 2001–present
- American Society of Clinical Oncology, 2002–present
- Society of Surgical Oncology, 2002–present
- American College of Surgeons, 2003–present
- New York Metropolitan Breast Cancer Group, 2005–present
- Society of Surgical Oncology Membership Committee, 2011–present
- Breast Cancer Alliance Medical Advisory Board, 2012–present
- Medical Advisory Board of Women's Voices for Change, 2012–present
- New York Surgical Society, 2012–present

== Honors and awards ==
- Mother of the Year Award, American Cancer Society, 2013

== Articles ==
Partial list of peer-reviewed articles:

- Simon Fitzgerald, Anya Romanoff, Almog Cohen, Hank Schmidt, Christina Weltz, Ira J. Bleiweiss, Shabnam Jaffer, Elisa R. Port, "Close and Positive Lumpectomy Margins are Associated with Similar Rates of Residual Disease with Additional Surgery". Annals of Surgical Oncology, December 2016, Volume 23, Issue 13, pp 4270–4276 PMID 27581606
- Anup Sood, Alexandra M. Miller, Edi Brogi, Yunxia Sui, Joshua Armenia, Elizabeth McDonough AlbertoSantamaria-Pang, Sean Carlin, Aleksandra Stamper, Carl Campos, Zhengyu Pang, Qing Li, Elisa Port, Thomas G. Graeber, Nikolaus Schultz, Fiona Ginty, Steven M. Larson, and Ingo K. Mellinghoff. "Multiplexed immunofluorescence delineates proteomic cancer cell states associated with metabolism". Journal of Clinical Investigation, e87030, May 5, 2016 PMID 27182557
- William M. Sikov, Donald A. Berry, Charles M. Perou, Baljit Singh, Constance T. Cirrincione, Sara M. Tolaney, Charles S. Kuzma, Timothy J. Pluard, George Somlo, Elisa R. Port, Mehra Golshan, Jennifer R. Bellon, Deborah Collyar, Olwen M. Hahn, Lisa A. Carey, Clifford A. Hudis, Eric P. Winer. "Impact of the addition of carboplatin and/or bevacizumab to neoadjuvant weekly paclitaxel followed by dose-dense doxorubicin and cyclophosphamide on pathologic complete response rates in Stage II-III triple-negative breast cancer: CALGB 40603 (Alliance)". Journal of Clinical Oncology, 2014. PMID 25092775
- Schmidt H., Port E. "Commentary on Kaur et al. Sentinel Lymph Node Biopsy in Patients with Previous Ipsilateral Complete Axillary Lymph Node Dissection". Breast Diseases: A Year Book Quarterly, 2012; 23(1):72-73. PMID 20593244
- Palaskas N., Larson S., Schultz N., Komisopoulou E., Wong D., Rohle D., Campos C., Yannuzzi N., Osborne J., Linkov I., Kastenhuber E., Taschereau R., Plaisier S.B., Tran C., Heguy A., Wu H., Sander C., Phelps M.E., Brennan C.W., Port E.R., Huse J.T., Graeber T.G. "18F-fluorodeoxy-glucose Positron Emission Tomography (18FDG-PET) Marks Basal-Like Human Breast Cancer with MYC Overexpression". AACR 2011 March 17. PMID 21646475
- Port E.R., Patil S., Stempel M., Morrow M., Cody H.S. "The Number of Nodes Removed in Sentinel Node-Negative Breast Cancer Patients is Significantly Related to Patient Age and Tumor Size: A New Source of Bias in Morbidity Assessment?" Cancer 2010 Feb 11 (Epub ahead of print). PMID 21646475
- Chung A., Schoder H., Sampson M., Morrow M., Port E.R. "Incidental Breast Lesions Identified by 18F-Fluorodeoxyglucose-Positron Emission Tomography". Ann Surg Oncol 2010 Feb 17 (Epub ahead of print). PMID 20162459
- Garwood E.R., Kumar A.S., Baehner F.L., Moore D.H., Au A., Flowers C., Troyan S., Garber J., Olopade O., Hylton N., Port E.R., Campbell M.C., Esserman L.J. "Fluvastatin reduces proliferation and increases apoptosis in women with high grade breast cancer". Breast Can Res Treat 2010;119(1):137-144. PMID 19728082
- Karam A.K., Hsu M., Patil S., Stempel M., Traina T.A., Ho A.Y., Cody H.S., Port E.R., Morrow M., Gemignani M.L. "Predictors of completion axillary lymph node dissection in patients with positive sentinel lymph nodes". Ann Surg Oncol 2009 Jul;16(7):1952-8. PMID 19381724
- Disa J.J., Port E.R. "More than 200,000 women will be diagnosed with breast cancer in 2008". Cancer J. 2008 Jul-Aug; 14(4):214-5. PMID 18677127

== Books and book chapters ==
Partial list:

- The New Generation Breast Cancer Book: How to Navigate Your Diagnosis and Treatment Options-and Remain Optimistic-in an Age of Information Overload, Ballantine Books, 2015 ISBN 1101883154
- Port, ER. Chapter 17: "Commentary – Breast Cancer Therapeutics". In: Silberman H., Silberman A.W. (eds). Principles and Practice of Surgical Oncology, 2nd ed. Lippincott Williams & Wilkins, Philadelphia, 2010:356. ISBN 0781765463
- Port E.R., Morris E.A. Chapter 35: "Breast MRI". In: Kuerer H.M. (ed). Kuerer's Breast Surgical Oncology, 1st ed. McGraw Hill, New York, 2009 ISBN 0071601767

== See also ==
- Breast cancer
- Surgical oncology
- Cancer
