= 1038 Tuckia =

Main-belt asteroid

Discovery
- Discovered by: M. F. Wolf
- Discovery site: Heidelberg Obs.
- Discovery date: 24 November 1924

Designations
- Named after: Edward Tuck (American philanthropist)
- Alternative designations: 1924 TK · 1932 VA
- Minor planet category: main-belt · (outer); Hilda

Orbital characteristics
- Epoch 4 September 2017 (JD 2458000.5)
- Uncertainty parameter 0
- Observation arc: 92.34 yr (33,728 days)
- Aphelion: 4.8595 AU
- Perihelion: 3.1044 AU
- Semi-major axis: 3.9820 AU
- Eccentricity: 0.2204
- Orbital period (sidereal): 7.95 yr (2,902 days)
- Mean anomaly: 340.94°
- Mean motion: 0° 7^{m} 26.4^{s} / day
- Inclination: 9.1840°
- Longitude of ascending node: 57.769°
- Argument of perihelion: 305.02°
- Jupiter MOID: 0.7613 AU

Physical characteristics
- Dimensions: 52.69±2.41 km 58.3 km (DASTCOM); 58.36 km (derived)
- Synodic rotation period: 23.2 h
- Geometric albedo: 0.0244±0.006; 0.030±0.003; 0.0304 (derived)
- Spectral type: Tholen = DTU: · DTU: B–V = 0.768; U–B = 0.232
- Absolute magnitude (H): 10.58 · 10.60±0.45 · 10.82

1038 Tuckia, provisional designation 1924 TK, is rare-type Hilda asteroid from the outermost regions of the asteroid belt, approximately 58 kilometers in diameter. It was discovered on 24 November 1924, by German astronomer by Max Wolf at Heidelberg Observatory in southwest Germany. The asteroid was named after American banker Edward Tuck and his wife.

== Classification and orbit ==
Tuckia is a member of the Hilda family (001), an asteroid family within the dynamical Hilda group, an orbital group of asteroids in the outermost main-belt, that stay in a 3:2 orbital resonance with the gas giant Jupiter. This means that the asteroid makes 3 orbits for every 2 orbits Jupiter makes.

It orbits the Sun at a distance of 3.1–4.9 AU once every 7 years and 11 months (2,902 days). Its orbit has an eccentricity of 0.22 and an inclination of 9° with respect to the ecliptic. The asteroids's observation arc begins with its official discovery observation at Heidelberg.

== Physical characteristics ==
In the Tholen classification, Tuckia is a rare DTU:-type, a subtype of the dark D-type asteroids.

=== Lightcurves ===
In the 1990s, a rotational lightcurve of Tuckia was obtained from photometric observations by Swedish astronomer Dahlgren and colleges during a survey of Hildian asteroids. Lightcurve analysis gave a somewhat longer than average rotation period of 23.2 hours with a brightness amplitude of 0.1 magnitude (U=2).

=== Diameter and albedo ===
According to the survey carried out by the Japanese Akari satellite, Tuckia measures 52.69 kilometers in diameter and its surface has an albedo of 0.030, while the Collaborative Asteroid Lightcurve Link derives an albedo of 0.0304 and a diameter of 58.36 kilometers based on an absolute magnitude of 10.82.

== Naming ==
This minor planet was named after American banker and philanthropist Edward Tuck (1842–1938) and his wife. He is the son of Amos Tuck who was a founder of the Republican Party in the United States. The name was suggested by G. Camille Flammarion. The official naming citation was published by Paul Herget in The Names of the Minor Planets in 1955 (H 99).
