= Marc Oliver Opresnik =

German economist

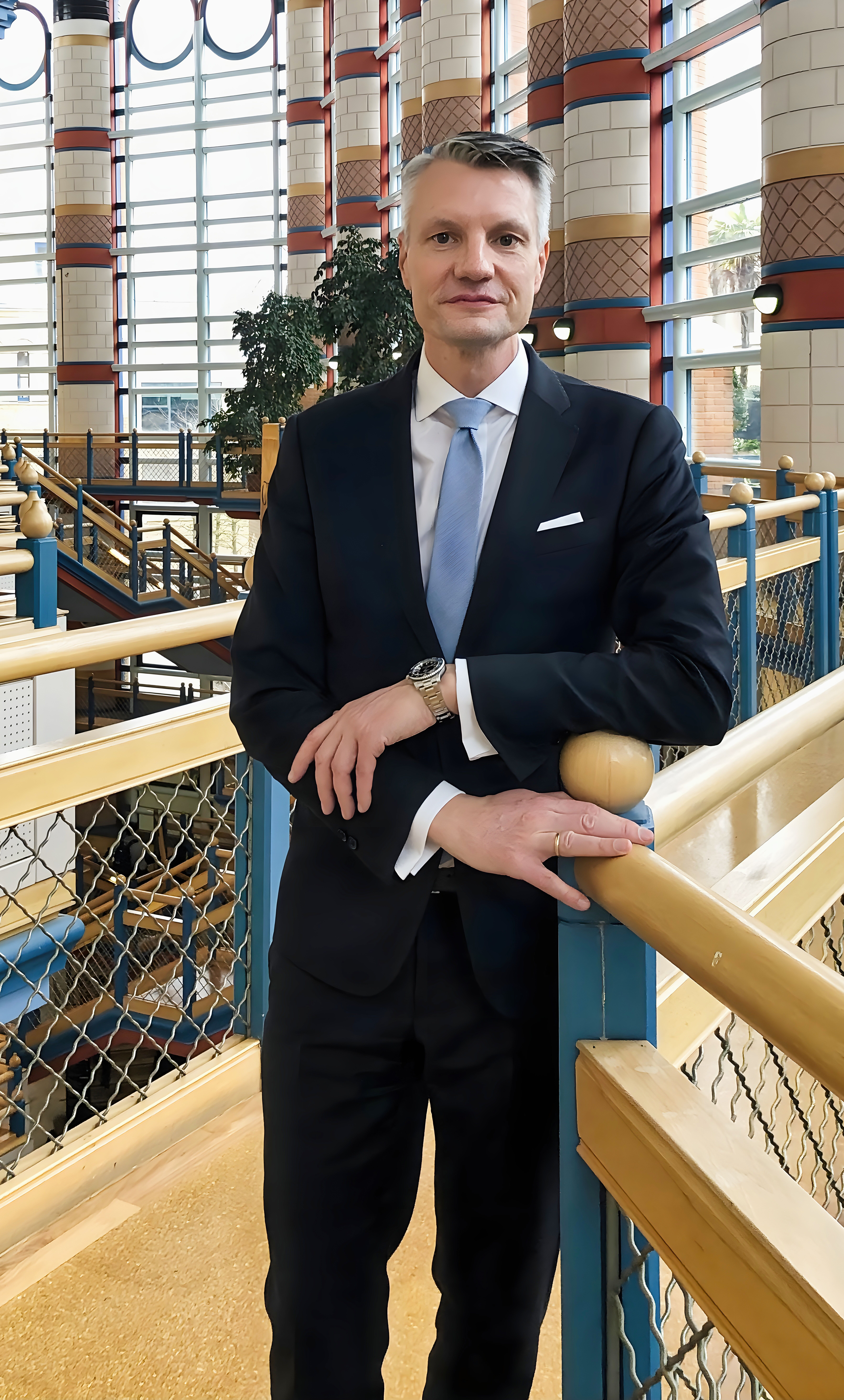
- Marc Oliver Opresnik at the Cambridge Judge Business School of the University of Cambridge
- Born: September 27, 1969 (age 57); Duisburg, Germany
- Education: University of Hamburg
- Occupations: Author, Marketing Professor, Researcher
- Known for: marketing

Marc Oliver Opresnik (/oʊˈprɛsnɪk/ oh-PRESS-ik; born September 27, 1969) is a German marketing scholar and professor of business administration at the Lübeck University of Applied Sciences. His work focuses on marketing, social media, communication, and negotiation. He has co-authored several books with American marketing professor Philip Kotler, including Marketing Management and Marketing: An Introduction.

== Career ==
Opresnik studied business administration at the University of Hamburg, where he received his doctorate in 1988 with a dissertation on ”Corporate Culture in the USA and Germany“. He has worked for ten years in management and strategy positions at a global corporation.

Since 2008, Opresnik has been Professor of Business Administration, with a focus on marketing and management at the Technische Hochschule Lübeck, a public corporation. He is also serves as Deputy Director at the Institute for Entrepreneurship and Business Development. In addition, he is a visiting professor and affiliate member to other international universities such as Regent's University London and East China University of Science and Technology in Shanghai.

Since 2013 Opresnik has been a director of the board of SGMI Management Institut St. Gallen in Switzerland.

He is a member of the editorial boards of various academic journals, including Transnational Marketing Journal and Innovative Marketing.

In May 2025, he received the honorary professorship in Strategic Marketing and Leadership at the New Delhi Institute of Management (NDIM) in India.

In June 2025, Opresnik was appointed as a Global Thought Leader to the Academic Speakers Bureau of the London School of Economics (LSE).

In the same year, Opresnik developed the strategic framework PIVOTAL Infinity Marketing Canvas, which integrates key elements of marketing, strategy, and leadership. The term was registered as a European Union trademark under his name with the European Union Intellectual Property Office (EUIPO) in July 2025.

== Selected publications ==
- Marc Oliver Opresnik, Svend Hollensen (2010). Marketing – A relationship perspective. Munich: Vahlen.
- Marc Oliver Opresnik, Carsten Rennhak (2011). Grundlagen der Betriebswirtschaftslehre. Heidelberg, New York, London: Springer.
- Marc Oliver Opresnik (2014). The Hidden Rules of Successful Negotiation and Communication. Heidelberg, New York, London: Springer.
- Nils Bickhoff, Svend Hollensen, Marc Oliver Opresnik (2014). The Quintessence of Marketing. Heidelberg, New York, London: Springer.
- Kevin Keller, Philip Kotler, Marc Oliver Opresnik (2015). Marketing Management, 14th edition. Pearson.
- Marc Oliver Opresnik, Svend Hollensen (2015). Marketing – A relationship perspective, 2nd edition. Munich: Vahlen.
- Marc Oliver Opresnik, Carsten Rennhak (2016). Marketing: Grundlagen. Heidelberg, New York, London: Springer.
- Gary Armstrong, Marc Oliver Opresnik, Philip Kotler (2016). Marketing: An Introduction, Global Edition, 13th edition. Prentice Hall.
- Marc Oliver Opresnik, Oguz Yilmaz (2016). Die Geheimnisse erfolgreichen Online-Marketings mit YouTube. Social-MediaErfolgsstrategien für Unternehmen und Unternehmer. Heidelberg, New York, London: Springer.
- Marc Oliver Opresnik, Philip Kotler, Svend Hollensen (2017). Social Media Marketing: A Practitioner Guide (Opresnik Management Guides Book 2) (English ed.). Opresnik Management Consulting.
- Kevin Keller, Philip Kotler, Marc Oliver Opresnik (2017). Marketing Management, 15th edition. Pearson.
- Marc Oliver Opresnik, Svend Hollensen (2017). Marketing: Principles and Practice: A Comprehensive Guide for Students and Practitioners (Opresnik Management Guides, Band 3). Independently published.
- Marc Oliver Opresnik (2018). Convinced! Communicate, present and negotiate successfully: Inspire people and achieve more (Opresnik Management Guides, Band 7). Independently published.
- Marc Oliver Opresnik, Svend Hollensen (2018). Marketing: Principles and Practice: A Comprehensive Guide for Students and Practitioners (Opresnik Management Guides, Band 8). Independently published.
- Marc Oliver Opresnik, Philip Kotler, Svend Hollensen (2019). Social Media Marketing: A Practitioner Guide, 3rd edition (Opresnik Management Guides Book 11) (English ed.). Opresnik Management Consulting.
- Marc Oliver Opresnik, Philip Kotler, Svend Hollensen (2020). El marketing en redes sociales: Una guía práctica (Opresnik Management Guides nº 15) (Spanish ed.). Opresnik Management Consulting.
- Marc Oliver Opresnik, Svend Hollensen (2020). El marketing en redes sociales: Una guía práctica (Opresnik Management Guides nº 15) (Spanish ed.). Opresnik Management Consulting.
- Marc Oliver Opresnik, Svend Hollensen (2020). Marketing: Principles and Practice: A management-oriented approach, 3rd edition (Opresnik Management Guides Book 18) (English ed.). Opresnik Management Consulting.
- Marc Oliver Opresnik, Philip Kotler, Svend Hollensen (2020). Social Media Marketing: A Practitioner Guide, 4th edition (Opresnik Management Guides) (English ed.). Opresnik Management Consulting.
- Marc Oliver Opresnik, Philip Kotler, Svend Hollensen (2025). PIVOTAL Strategy: The Infinity Marketing Canvas and Framework, 1st edition (Opresnik Management Guides) (English ed.). Opresnik Management Consulting.
