= Petra Bonfert-Taylor =

German mathematician

- Education: Technische Universität Berlin
- Known for: Complex analysis
- Awards: Fellow of Association for Women in Mathematics; edX Prize for Exceptional Contributions in Online Learning and Teaching
- Scientific career
- Fields: Mathematics
- Workplaces: Thayer School of Engineering at Dartmouth College
- Thesis: Interationen in Plamar Domains (2008)
- Doctoral advisor: Christian Pommerenke
- Website: engineering.dartmouth.edu/community/faculty/petra-bonfert-taylor

Petra Bonfert-Taylor is a German-born mathematician known for research in complex analysis and her work in web development for the International Mathematical Union (IMU) Committee for Women in Mathematics. She is a professor of engineering and Associate Dean of Diversity and Inclusion at the Thayer School of Engineering at Dartmouth College in Hanover, New Hampshire.

== Education, career, and recognition ==
Bonfert-Taylor was born, raised, and educated in Berlin, Germany. She received Bachelor's and Master's degrees in mathematics and computer science from Technische Universität Berlin and her PhD (summa cum laude) in mathematics from the same institution in 1996 under the supervision of Christian Pommerenke. She was on the faculty on Wesleyan University from 1999 to 2015. She joined the faculty of Dartmouth in 2015.

Bonfert-Taylor helped develop the website for the International Mathematical Union (IMU) and serves on IMU's Committee for Women in Mathematics, whose purpose is "to promote international contacts between national and regional organizations from women in mathematical sciences."

In 2018, Bonfert-Taylor was named the New Hampshire High Tech Council's Tech Teacher of the Year. In 2019, Bonfert-Taylor and Rémi Sharrock from Institut Mines-Télécom of France earned the edX Prize for Exceptional Contributions in Online Learning and Teaching for their Professional Certification program in C Programming with Linux.

Bonfert-Taylor was elected a fellow of the Association for Women in Mathematics in the Class of 2020 "for her work as a U.S. liaison and in web creation and management for the IMU's Committee on Women in Mathematics; for development and study of programs building inclusivity in STEM; and for becoming an example of broadening research interests, by adding research in medical imaging to work in complex analysis."
