= Christopher A. Sinclair =

American businessman (born 1950)

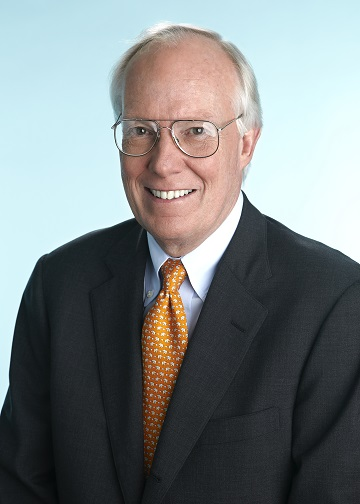
- Born: September 5, 1950 (age 76); Hong Kong
- Education: Vermont Academy (1967); University of Kansas (B.A., Marketing, 1971); Dartmouth College (MBA, 1973)
- Occupations: Chairman, Reckitt; Former CEO, Mattel
- Board member of: Foot Locker 1995-2008; Mattel 1996-2018; PepsiCo 1996-1996; Perdue Farms 1992-2000; Reckitt 2015-present
- Spouse: Margaret
- Children: 3

Christopher A. Sinclair (born September 5, 1950) is an American businessman. He is the chairman of Reckitt. He is the former chairman and CEO of Mattel. Previously, he was chairman and CEO of Pepsi-Cola.

== Background ==
Sinclair was born in Hong Kong, and spent his childhood in Mumbai, India, and was educated at the Kodaikanal International School followed by four years at Vermont Academy in Saxtons River, Vermont. Sinclair's father was president of Esso Oil (now ExxonMobil)'s international operations.

Chris Sinclair graduated summa cum laude from the University of Kansas with a bachelor's degree in marketing, and he was a member of Alpha Tau Omega. Sinclair went on to receive an MBA from the Tuck School of Business at Dartmouth College in 1973.

== Business career ==
Sinclair began his career at General Foods and Newsweek, before spending more than 15 years at PepsiCo. In 1989, he was promoted from Pepsi USA's central division president to president of newly formed Pepsi-Cola International. Sinclair was promoted to CEO of PepsiCo Foods and Beverages International in 1993, and ultimately to chairman and CEO of Pepsi-Cola. He was a member of the PepsiCo board of directors.

Sinclair directed Pepsi's entry into the Indian market, and recruited Pepsi's former CEO Indra Nooyi. As an example of his ambition, Sinclair told Fortune magazine in 1994, "If Coke starts growing 8%, we'll do 10% or 12%." Sinclair predicted non-U.S. cola sales of $5 billion by 1995, and exceeded his goal. He retired from PepsiCo in 1996.

Since his tenure at PepsiCo, Sinclair has been CEO of QFC (NYSE), a US west coast supermarket chain backed by billionaire Samuel Zell's Equity Group. After 18-months, Quality Food expanded rapidly and was sold to Fred Meyer, for $1.7 billion in 1998. Sinclair helped orchestrate the deal and was a large shareholder. Fred Meyer is now owned by Kroger.

Sinclair led the financial restructuring of Caribiner International (now Jack Morton Worldwide) as chairman and CEO of this Warburg Pincus-sponsored global business communications company. He has served as a partner at Pegasus Capital Advisors, and an operating partner at Morgan Joseph TriArtisan, a New York based merchant bank. He was the executive chairman and CEO of Cambridge Solutions Ltd, the second-largest BPO/IT company in the world, which was sold in 2008 to Xchanging, a General Atlantic-backed business services company.

Sinclair served as chairman of Mattel from January 2015 to May 2018, and as CEO from January 2015 to February 2017.

In May 2018, he became the non-executive chairman of Reckitt, the maker of Lysol, having served as a director since February 2015.

He is a former director of Foot Locker, FW Woolworth Company, Merisant (Equal Sugar), PepsiCo and Perdue Farms He has served as a trustee at Brunswick School, Vermont Academy, on the board of overseers at the Tuck School of Business.

== Personal ==
Sinclair, and his wife Margaret, reside in Greenwich, Connecticut and Palm Beach, Florida. Margaret is the former president of the Breast Cancer Alliance. His son William is the Co-CEO of J.P. Morgan U.S. Private Bank.
