= Sarah Irving =

Canadian businesswoman

Member of the Board of Governors of Rothesay Netherwood School
- Incumbent
- Assumed office 2009

Trustee of the IWK Health Centre
- In office 2015–2024

Personal details
- Born: 1988 (age 37–38)
- Citizenship: Canadian
- Occupation: Executive

Sarah Irving is a Canadian business executive who was the Executive Vice President and Chief Brand Officer of Irving Oil, a member company of the Irving Group of Companies, until 2023. She is the granddaughter of K. C. Irving, and heir to billionaire Arthur Irving with an estimated net worth of US$7.01 billion.

Irving serves as an adviser to Dartmouth College's Dartmouth College Fund, the school's primary source of financial aid, and on the Board of Governors for the Rothesay Netherwood School. She was also a board trustee for the IWK Foundation.

== Business career ==
Upon graduating from Dartmouth College in 2010, Irving worked as a strategy consultant for Deloitte in New York for two years before returning to school to receive her MBA. Upon graduating, Irving joined Ian Whitcomb, previously a partner at Deloitte, to lead the family-owned petroleum products refiner and distributor, Irving Oil.

She was on the leadership team of Irving Oil, as the company's executive vice president and chief brand officer. In addition, Irving was the second of Arthur Irving's children (his eldest son, Kenneth, was President of Irving Oil for a decade but abruptly left in 2010) to hold a senior position at the company, suggesting a possible succession plan at Irving Oil, in which Sarah Irving would take over the privately owned business.

As Chief Brand Officer, Irving led several initiatives to improve the oil company's community image, such as raising $300,000 to help defray hospital travel costs with the company's seven partner hospitals across Canada and New England. She also served as the keynote speaker for a charity auction hosted by the Junior Achievement branch in Canada. Additionally, Irving served as the keynote speaker at the East Coast Energy Connection conference, in which she described the critical role that Saint John, Canada played in the future of Irving Oil.

In 2016, Irving was listed as one of Canada's most powerful business people. Irving was removed from Irving Oil's list of executives in 2023 amidst speculation surrounding a possible sale of the company.

== Education ==
Irving graduated from the Rothesay Netherwood School in 2006, where she currently serves as a Governor. In 2010, Irving received a Bachelor of Arts degree (cum laude) from Dartmouth College, where she rowed division 1 crew and competed at the NCAA Division I Rowing Championship. In 2014, Irving received a Masters in Business Administration from the Tuck School of Business at Dartmouth.

== Personal ==
In 2016, Irving, Irving Oil, her family, and the Arthur L. Irving Family Foundation made a lead gift of $80 million to Dartmouth College, founding the Arthur L. Irving Institute for Energy and Society. The donation was considered controversial by alumni of the college given the conflict of interest between Irving Oil and the center's mission of tackling global energy issues. In addition, an opinion article in The Dartmouth directly criticized Irving for funding the institute.
