= Elyse Allan =

Canadian businesswoman

Elyse Allan CM
- Born: Mary Elyse Allan; 1956 or 1957 (age 68–69)
- Education: Dartmouth College
- Occupations: President and CEO of GE Canada; Vice President of General Electric
- Board member of: Tuck School of Business; Royal Ontario Museum; C. D. Howe Institute; Conference Board of Canada; Brookfield Corporation; Westinghouse Electric Corporation; Business Council of Canada
- Spouse: Don
- Children: 1 son

Mary Elyse Allan CM (born 1956/1957) is a Canadian businesswoman, and a former president and CEO of GE Canada. She was awarded the Order of Canada for community engagement.

== Early life and education ==
Allan is originally from suburban New York.

In 1979, Allan received a bachelor's degree from Dartmouth College in biology and environmental studies, and an MBA in 1984 from the Tuck School of Business at Dartmouth, where she also serves on the board of overseers. Allan received honorary doctorates from Ryerson University, Saint Mary's University and Royal Roads University.

== Business career ==
Allan's career at General Electric began in 1984 and she has worked in the US and Canada in several industrial and consumer GE businesses including aviation, energy, and lighting. She retired from GE Canada at the end of June 2018, ending a 14-year career as the head of its Canadian division.

Allan serves as a director on boards including the Tuck School of Business at Dartmouth College, the Royal Ontario Museum, the C. D. Howe Institute, and the Conference Board of Canada. Allan has completed her board terms at the Business Council of Canada and the Canadian Chamber of Commerce, where she also served as chair. She joined GE in 1984 and transferred to the Canadian operation in 1988. She left General Electric to work as a marketing executive with Ontario Hydro. She then spent a decade as president and CEO of the Toronto Board of Trade, returning to GE Canada as CEO in 2004. Allan retired as CEO of GE Canada in 2018. She served as an economic advisor to the Canadian Government under Stephen Harper and Justin Trudeau.

== Personal life ==
Allan is married to Don, they have one son, and live in Toronto. In 2014, she was awarded the Order of Canada for "her achievements as an innovative business leader and for her community involvement."
