= Matthew J. Slaughter =

Business professor (born 1969)

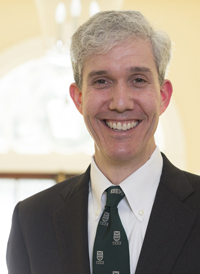
- Education: University of Notre Dame; MIT
- Known for: Dean of the Tuck School of Business at Dartmouth

Matthew J. Slaughter (born 1969) is the Paul Danos Dean and the Earl C. Daum 1924 Professor of International Business at the Tuck School of Business at Dartmouth College. He is also the founding Faculty Director of Tuck's Center for Global Business and Government. In addition, he is currently a research associate at the National Bureau of Economic Research; an adjunct Senior Fellow at the Council on Foreign Relations; a member of the advisory committee of the Export-Import Bank of the United States, a member of the academic advisory board of the International Tax Policy Forum; and an academic advisor to the McKinsey Global Institute.

Slaughter has written for several academic journals and co-authored the book Globalization and the Perceptions of American Workers.

From 2005 to 2007 he was on leave from Dartmouth while he served on the Council of Economic Advisers. Slaughter joined the Faculty of Arts & Sciences at Dartmouth in 1994 and became a member of the Tuck School faculty in 2002. He is a recipient of the Tuck School's John M. Manley Huntington Teaching Award, and a member of Phi Beta Kappa. Slaughter received his bachelor's degree summa cum laude from University of Notre Dame in 1990, and his doctorate from the Massachusetts Institute of Technology in 1994 under the supervision of Paul Krugman.
