= Stell Hospital =

Coordinates: 48.8760458°N 2.1870631°E

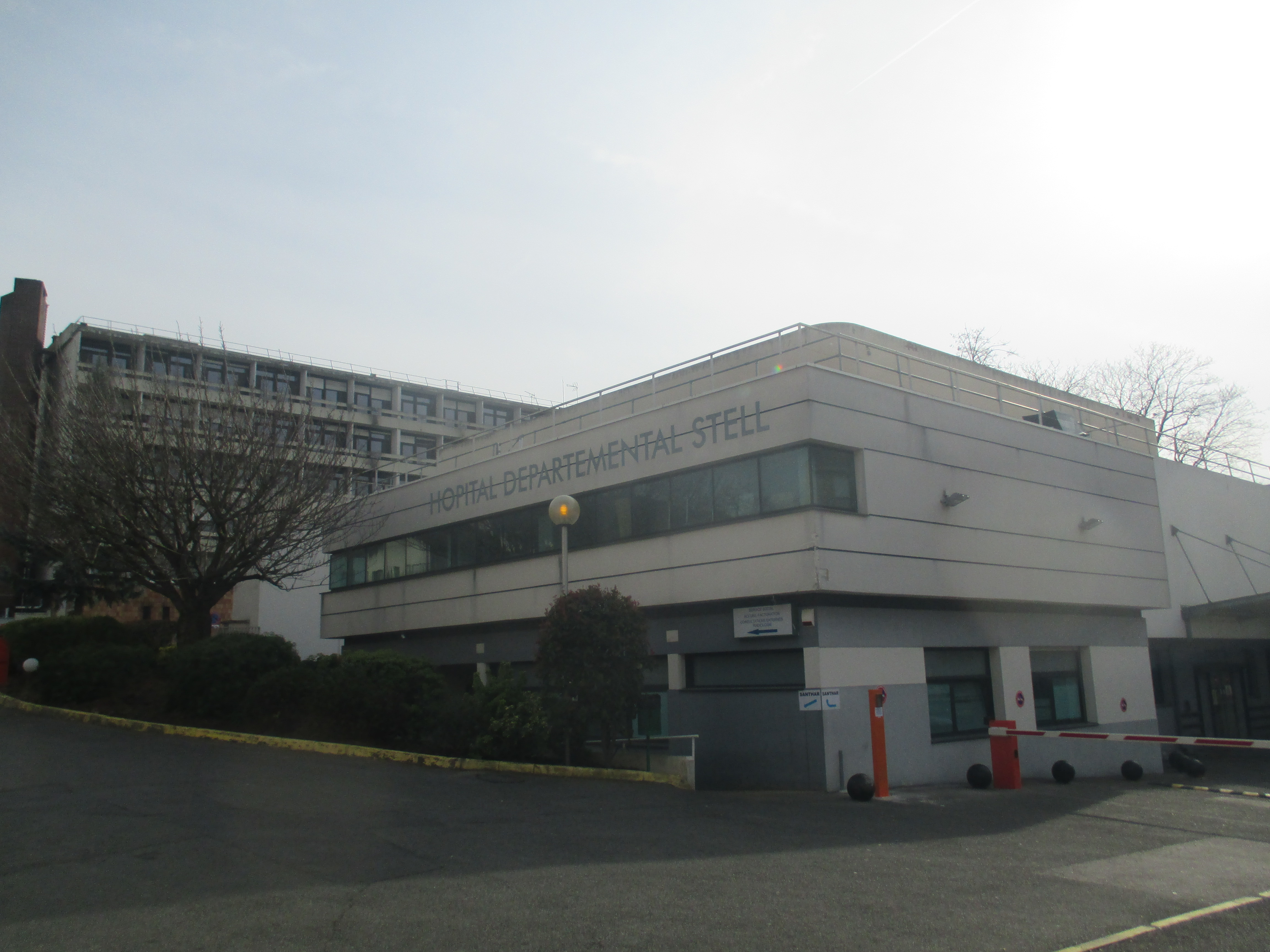

Geography
- Location: Rueil-Malmaison, Île-de-France, France

Organisation
- Type: Teaching

Services
- Emergency department: Yes
- Beds: 163

History
- Opened: August 1903

Links
- Website: www.chd-stell.fr
- Lists: Hospitals in France

The Stell Hospital is a teaching hospital in Rueil-Malmaison. It is a teaching hospital of Sorbonne University.

It was established in August 1903 by American philanthropist Edward Tuck and is named after his wife Julia Stell.
