= Gordon Phillips (economist) =

American economist

Gordon M. Phillips is an American financial economist who is the Laurence F. Whittemore Professor of Business Administration and Professor of Finance at the Tuck School of Business at Dartmouth College. He specializes in corporate finance, mergers and acquisitions, private equity, and the application of natural language processing (NLP) and artificial intelligence (AI) to finance. Phillips is a faculty advisor at Tuck’s Center for Private Equity and Venture Capital and previously served as its faculty director. He is also a research associate at the National Bureau of Economic Research (NBER) and has held visiting appointments at Tsinghua University (Beijing), UNSW Sydney, Harvard Business School, Duke University, HEC Paris, INSEAD, and MIT.

Phillips’s research has appeared in journals including the Journal of Finance, Journal of Political Economy, Review of Financial Studies, Review of Economic Studies, Econometrica, and Management Science.

== Early life and education ==
Phillips received his BA from Northwestern University in 1986 and his MA and PhD in economics from Harvard University in 1991.

== Academic career ==
Phillips is a member of the finance faculty at Tuck, where he holds the Laurence F. Whittemore chair. He serves as a faculty advisor to the Center for Private Equity and Venture Capital and previously served as its faculty director. He is a research associate at the NBER and has held visiting research positions at several universities, including Tsinghua University and UNSW Sydney, as well as visiting positions at Harvard Business School, Duke University, HEC Paris, INSEAD, and MIT.

== Research ==
Phillips’s work examines how financial decisions interact with product-market behavior, competition, and firm boundaries. He has coauthored studies using text-based methods to measure product-market synergies and industry structure, and he has published research on credit access, employment, and entrepreneurship.

== Selected Publications (2000–2025) ==
- Giambona, Erasmo; Kumar, Anil; Phillips, Gordon (2025)."Hedging, Contract Enforceability and Competition."Review of Financial Studies, 38(7): 2034–2087.
- Larraín, Borja; Phillips, Gordon; Sertsios, Giorgo; Urzúa, Francisco (2025)."The Effects of Going Public on Firm Profitability and Strategy."Review of Financial Studies, 38(8): 2467–2514.
- Hoberg, Gerard; Phillips, Gordon (2025)."Scope, Scale and Concentration: The 21st Century Firm."Journal of Finance, 80(1): 415–466 (Winner of the Brattle Distinguished Paper Prize).
- Braxton, J. Carter; Herkenhoff, Kyle F.; Phillips, Gordon (2024)."Can the Unemployed Borrow: Implications for Public Insurance."Journal of Political Economy.
- Herkenhoff, Kyle F.; Lise, Jeremy; Menzio, Guido; Phillips, Gordon (2024)."Production and Learning in Teams."Econometrica, 92(2): 467–504.
- Herkenhoff, Kyle F.; Phillips, Gordon; Cohen-Cole, Ethan (2024)."How Credit Constraints Impact Job Finding Rates, Sorting, and Aggregate Output."Review of Economic Studies.
- Phillips, Gordon; Zhdanov, Alexei (2024)."Venture Capital Investments, Merger Activity, and Competition Laws around the World."Review of Corporate Finance Studies, 13(2): 303–334.
- Maksimovic, Vojislav; Phillips, Gordon; Yang, Liu (2023)."Do IPO Firms Become Myopic?"Review of Finance, 27(3): 765–807.
- Hsu, Chiao-Yu; Li, Xi; Ma, Zhenzhen; Phillips, Gordon (2022)."Does Industry Competition Influence Analyst Coverage Decisions and Career Outcomes?"Journal of Financial and Quantitative Analysis.
- Herkenhoff, Kyle; Phillips, Gordon; Cohen-Cole, Ethan (2021)."The Impact of Consumer Credit Access on Self-Employment and Entrepreneurship."Journal of Financial Economics, 141(1): 345–371.
- Moon, S. Katie; Phillips, Gordon (2021)."Outsourcing Supply Contracts, Human Capital and Firm Capital Structure."Management Science, 67(1): 363–387.
- Frésard, Laurent; Hoberg, Gerard; Phillips, Gordon (2020)."Innovation Activities and Integration through Vertical Acquisitions."Review of Financial Studies (Recipient of the Oliver Williamson Best Paper Award).
- Bai, John; Carvalho, Daniel; Phillips, Gordon (2018)."The Impact of Bank Credit on Labor Reallocation and Aggregate Industry Productivity."Journal of Finance, 73(6): 2787–2836.
- Hoberg, Gerard; Phillips, Gordon (2018)."Text-Based Industry Momentum."Journal of Financial and Quantitative Analysis, 53(6): 2355–2388 (Sharpe Best Paper Award).
- Li, M.; Lu, Y.; Phillips, Gordon (2019)."CEOs and the Product Market: When Are Powerful CEOs Beneficial?"Journal of Financial and Quantitative Analysis, 54(6): 2295–2326.
- Phillips, Gordon; Sertsios, Giorgo (2017)."Financing and New Product Decisions of Private and Publicly Traded Firms."Review of Financial Studies, 30(5): 1744–1789.
- Hoberg, Gerard; Phillips, Gordon (2017)."Conglomerate Industry Choice and Product Language."Management Science, 63(11): 3652–3675.
- Frésard, Laurent; Hege, Ulrich; Phillips, Gordon (2017)."Extending Industry Specialization through Cross-Border Acquisitions."Review of Financial Studies, 30(5): 1539–1582.
- Hoberg, Gerard; Phillips, Gordon (2016)."Text-Based Network Industries and Endogenous Product Differentiation."Journal of Political Economy, 124(5): 1423–1465.
- Hoberg, Gerard; Phillips, Gordon (2010)."Product Market Synergies and Competition in Mergers and Acquisitions: A Text-Based Analysis."Review of Financial Studies, 23(10): 3773–3811.
- MacKay, Peter; Phillips, Gordon M. (2005)."How Does Industry Affect Firm Financial Structure?"Review of Financial Studies, 18(4): 1433–1466.
- Maksimovic, Vojislav; Phillips, Gordon (2001)."The Market for Corporate Assets: Who Engages in Mergers and Asset Sales and Are There Efficiency Gains?"Journal of Finance, 56(6): 2019–2065.
