= Amos Tuck French =

American banker (1863–1941)

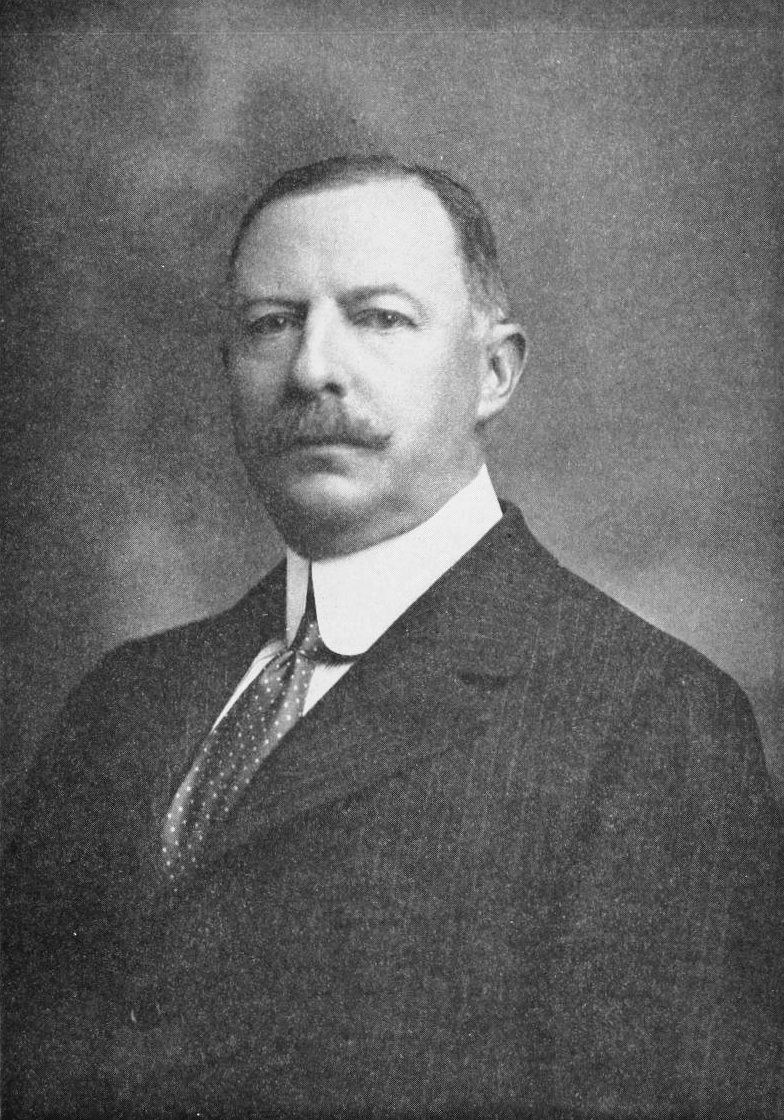
- Born: July 20, 1863; Boston, Massachusetts, U.S.
- Died: November 15, 1941 (aged 78); Chester, New Hampshire, U.S.
- Education: Harvard College
- Spouses: Pauline LeRoy (m. 1885; div. 1913) Martha Beeckman (m. 1914)
- Children: 6
- Relatives: William Henry Vanderbilt III (nephew); Amos Tuck (grandfather); Edward Tuck (uncle); William M.R. French (cousin)

Amos Tuck French (July 20, 1863 – November 15, 1941) was an American banker who was prominent in society. He was a member of the New York Stock Exchange and vice-president of the Manhattan Trust Company.

== Early life ==
French was born on July 20, 1863, in Boston, Massachusetts. He was the son of Ellen (née Tuck) French (1838–1915) and Francis Ormond French (1837–1893), a Harvard graduate who served as president of the Manhattan Trust Company. His sister, Ellen "Elsie" Tuck French, was a close friend of Gertrude Vanderbilt Whitney and married Gertrude's brother, Alfred Gwynne Vanderbilt, in 1901. Elsie and Alfred divorced in 1909, he later died on the Lusitania, and she remarried to Paul Fitzsimons in 1919. Another sister, Elizabeth Richardson French, was the wife of Herbert Eaton, 3rd Baron Cheylesmore.

His paternal grandparents were Elizabeth Smith (née Richardson) French, a daughter of William Merchant Richardson (a U.S. Representative from Massachusetts and chief justice of the New Hampshire Supreme Court), and Benjamin Brown French, who was Clerk of the United States House of Representatives from 1845 to 1847 and was Commissioner of Public Buildings under President Abraham Lincoln. His maternal grandfather, and namesake, was Amos Tuck, a U.S. Representative and a founder of the Republican Party. His uncle, Edward Tuck, was Vice Consul of the American Legation in Paris who owned and lived at Domaine de Vert-Mont and Château de Bois-Préau.

He graduated from Harvard College with an A.B. degree in 1885.

== Career ==
In 1887, he became a member of the New York Stock Exchange, and in 1888, he became treasurer, then secretary and eventually vice-president of the Manhattan Trust Company, retiring in 1900 but staying a director until 1908. He served as a director of the Northern Pacific Railway, and the Northern Securities Company (a railroad trust formed in 1901 by Harriman, Hill, and Morgan that controlled the Northern Pacific Railway, the Great Northern Railway, and the Chicago, Burlington and Quincy Railroad).

== Personal life ==
On December 2, 1885, French was married to Pauline LeRoy (1864–1928) at All Saints' Chapel in Newport, Rhode Island by Bishop Henry C. Potter. Pauline was the daughter of Stuyvesant LeRoy and Pauline Winslow (née Bridge) LeRoy. Before their separation in August 1911, and eventual divorce in March 1913, they were the parents of:

- Pauline Leroy French (1886–1964), who first married Samuel Jones Wagstaff (1885–1975), son of Alfred Wagstaff Jr., in 1908. They divorced in 1920, and in December 1920, he married Polish émigré Olga (née Piorkowska) Thomas (and became the father of art collector Sam Wagstaff) and, in March 1921, she married young banker Donald Oliver MacRae.
- Francis Ormond French II (1888–1962), who married Eleanor Livingston Burrill (1891–1974), a daughter of Edward Livingston Burrill, in 1914. They divorced in 1923, and in 1930 he married Mary Frances Cleneay (1889–1946), daughter of Harry Quinton Cleneay.
- Julia Estelle French (1893–1963), who eloped with chauffeur John Paul Geraghty (1889–1937) in 1911, causing a rift in the family. They divorced in 1920, and she married Howard Thomas Williams (1894–1926), an insurance broker, in 1921.
- Stuyvesant LeRoy French (1895–1974), who married Harriet Hall (née Holder) Rittenhouse (1899–1973) in 1933. They divorced and he married Maud Coster (1884–1987), the former wife of Otto von Salm-Hoogstraeten (brother of Ludwig von Salm-Hoogstraeten who married Millicent Rogers), in 1965.
- Edward Tuck French (1899–1919), who died aged 19.
- Amos Tuck French Jr. (1901–1975), who married Emma Dulany Hunter in 1930.

In 1914, he married Martha Beeckman (1863–1951) at the home of her sister in Goshen, New York. Martha was the daughter of Gilbert Livingston Beeckman and Margaret Atherton (née Foster) Beeckman and the sister of Robert Livingston Beeckman, the 52nd Governor of Rhode Island. Martha was a descendant of Robert Livingston the Elder, Declaration of Independence signer Philip Livingston and "The Chancellor" Robert Livingston.

French died on November 15, 1941, at his estate, Journey's End, in Chester, New Hampshire. He was buried at the Chester Village Cemetery in Rockingham County, New Hampshire.

=== Descendants ===
Through his son Francis, he was the grandfather of Ellen Tuck French (1915–1974), who was the first wife of John Jacob Astor VI in 1934. After their divorce in May 1943, she remarried to Raymond R. Guest in 1953. Ellen's sister, Virginia Middleton French (1917–2011), would marry William Force Dick, Astor's half-brother, on December 18, 1941, before her later marriage to Philip B. Pool.
