= David T. McLaughlin =

American academic administrator (1932–2004)

14th President of Dartmouth College
- In office 1981–1987
- Preceded by: John George Kemeny
- Succeeded by: James O. Freedman

Personal details
- Born: March 16, 1932 Grand Rapids, Michigan
- Died: August 25, 2004 (aged 72) Dillingham, Alaska
- Education: Dartmouth College (BA, MBA)

David Thomas McLaughlin (March 16, 1932 – August 25, 2004) was the 14th President of Dartmouth College, 1981–1987. McLaughlin also was chief executive officer of Orion Safety Products from 1988 to December 31, 2000. He was chairman of the Aspen Institute from 1987 to 1988 and its president and chief executive officer from 1988 to 1997. He was chairman and chief executive officer of Toro Company from 1977 to 1981, after working in various management positions at Toro Company since 1970. McLaughlin was a director of CBS Corporation from 1979 and as chairman in the late 1990s. He also was a director of Infininity Broadcasting Corporation until the Infinity merger.

== Education ==
McLaughlin earned his A.B. from Dartmouth College in 1954 and his M.B.A. from the Tuck School of Business in 1955. As a Dartmouth undergraduate, McLaughlin was a member of Phi Beta Kappa and various student organizations such as Green Key, Palaeopitus, Beta Theta Pi fraternity, and Casque and Gauntlet. He was voted as the student holding "the greatest promise" out of his undergraduate class.

== Dartmouth presidency ==
McLaughlin joined the Dartmouth board of trustees in 1971 and became chairman in 1977. The trustees conducted a national search for the successor to then-president John Kemeny before deciding to elect their own chairman to the role in 1981.

McLaughlin's tenure as president saw growth in many areas of the college. Several new campus facilities were constructed, including the Rockefeller Center, Hood Museum, Berry Sports Center, and the Dartmouth Rowing Boathouse, along with improvements to classrooms and the Dartmouth Skiway. The John Sloan Dickey Center for International Understanding and the Institute for the Study of Applied and Professional Ethics were also established. Additionally, Dartmouth's professional schools—the Thayer School of Engineering, the Tuck School of Business, and the Dartmouth Medical School—grew and strengthened during this time.

Reflecting his business background, McLaughlin more than doubled Dartmouth's endowment, which reached a new high of $521 million. He increased faculty salaries by 43 percent over a five-year period.

Dartmouth experienced political unrest and protests under McLaughlin. In 1985, the college drew national attention when a group of students affiliated with conservative newspaper The Dartmouth Review used sledgehammers to destroy a shantytown that had been constructed by students on the college green to protest South African apartheid. McLaughlin also received backlash from students and faculty for reinstating the Reserve Officers Training Corps program.
