= Peter R. Dolan =

American business executive

- Born: January 6, 1956 (age 70); Salem, Massachusetts
- Education: Tufts University (BA); Dartmouth College (MBA)
- Occupation: Chief executive officer of Gemin X Pharmaceuticals
- Spouse: Katherine Helen Lange
- Children: 2
- Parent(s): Lois Burkhart and John Ralph Dolan

Peter R. Dolan (born January 6, 1956) is an American business executive. In 2009, he became chairman and CEO of Gemin X Pharmaceuticals after joining the board in July 2008; he was formerly the chief executive officer of Bristol-Myers Squibb before being discharged from that company in September 2006 as a result of a federal investigation into questions concerning the patent of drug Plavix.

== Personal life ==
The son of John Ralph Dolan and Lois Burkhart, Peter Dolan was born in Salem, Massachusetts, on January 6, 1956. Dolan attended St. John's Preparatory School (Massachusetts) before going on to Tufts University earning a B.A. in 1978 before going to the Tuck School of Business at Dartmouth College to earn his M.B.A. in 1980. While at Tufts, he joined Delta Upsilon fraternity. He wed former executive director of Saint Joseph's Hospital Katherine Helen Lange, with whom he shares two children.

== Early career ==
In 1983, Dolan began working at General Foods, rising to general product manager by 1986. In 1988, he took a job at Bristol-Myers Squibb. While at Bristol, Dolan was involved in developing the cancer-treating medication Erbitux, as well as, before becoming chief executive officer, making the consumer products and medical device divisions of Bristol successful. Dolan became CEO in May, 2001, replacing Charles Heimbold. Subsequently, Bristol was involved in a major financial scandal when, in the words of a Reuters report, it "was accused of exaggerating revenue by $2 billion from 2000 to 2001 by coaxing wholesalers to buy far more of its drugs than they could hope to sell". The company avoided criminal charges by accepting probation in June 2005, and Dolan brought in former United States federal judge Frederick B. Lacey to act as an adviser to Bristol.

In 2006, Forbes reported that Dolan was 250th in compensation among CEO's in the United States, earning a single year $5.54 million to make a five-year total of $17.80 million. In September 2006, Dolan was fired from Bristol on the recommendation of Lacey in response to a federal investigation that followed questions concerning the patenting of Plavix. Bristol was accused of attempting to prevent the marketing of a generic competitor for the drug by entering into a secret, unlawful arrangement with Canadian generic-manufacturer Apotex. The investigation centered around statements allegedly issued by Dr. Andrew Bodnar, who was an adviser to Dolan assigned to settle the situation with Apotex. A New York Times article from 2006 indicated that Lacey criticized Dolan for not properly communicating with the Bristol board about the situation. Bristol provided Dolan a severance package with a combined value of approximately $10.7 million, expressing appreciation for his service but also indicating that it held Dolan "accountable" as chief executive officer for the Plavix incident. As of 2007, Dolan had not released an official comment on the Plavix situation, nor had he been charged in conjunction with the investigation.

== Later career ==
In July, 2008, Dolan was appointed to the board of Gemin X Pharmaceuticals. and became CEO and chairman in 2009. Gemin X was sold to Cephalon for $225 million in March 2011 with an additional $300 million in future milestones. He founded a non-profit organization called ChildObesity 180, which has raised over $10 million in funding. He is on the board of a Partnership for a Healthier America, a non profit organization devoted to working with private industry on solving childhood obesity, and created in conjunction with First Lady Michelle Obama's Let's Move! program. He has continued active ties with his alma maters. He serves as a trustee at Tufts University and is now chairman of the board, also sitting on several committees. He is also a member of the board of overseers at the Tuck School of Business at Dartmouth. In 2013, he was elected as Tufts University chairman of the board, to take office in the fall.
