= Laura J. Esserman =

United States doctor

Laura J Esserman
- Born: Chicago, Illinois
- Education: Harvard University Stanford University Stanford Graduate School of Business
- Known for: I-SPY TRIALS, Athena Breast Health Network, WISDOM Study
- Medical career
- Profession: Surgeon
- Institutions: UCSF Medical Center UCSF Helen Diller Family Comprehensive Cancer Center
- Sub-specialties: Breast cancer
- Research: Oncology

Laura Esserman is a surgeon and breast cancer oncology specialist. She is the director of the Carol Franc Buck Breast Care Center at the University of California, San Francisco School of Medicine. She leads the I-SPY trials, Athena Breast Health Network and the WISDOM study. Esserman is an inductee in the Giants of Cancer Care, 2018, for Cancer Diagnostics and the "less is more" approach. She performs live in the show "Audacity" which she co-created. She is also known as the "singing surgeon" for singing to her patients as they go under anesthesia.

== Early life and education ==
Laura Esserman was born in Chicago, daughter of Charlene and Ron Esserman. She is one of four children. The Esserman family relocated to Miami, where her father was a car dealer and her mother a teacher. Esserman had an early interest in science which she pursued working in a research lab at the University of Miami during her high school years. Esserman attended college at Harvard University and completed medical school Stanford University. After finishing a postdoctoral fellowship in breast oncology at Stanford and earning a master's degree at the Stanford Graduate School of Business, Esserman joined the faculty at UCSF Medical Center in 1993.

== Work and research ==
Esserman is the director of the Carol Franc Buck Breast Care Center. She believes that some patients with a type of breast cancer, ductal carcinoma in situ, should be placed on active surveillance instead of undergoing a biopsy, mastectomy or lumpectomy. Dr. Esserman is one of the most vocal proponents of the idea that breast cancer screening brings with it overdiagnosis and overtreatment. In July 2020, Esserman was awarded two grants:

- NIH/NCI R01 Grant, $9.1M, to expand the WISDOM Study to Diverse and Underserved Patient Populations
- NIH T-32 training grant for Surgical Oncology, as the Principal Investigator with the UCSF Department of Surgery

== Honors and awards ==
Esserman was named in TIME Magazine's 100 most influential people in the world in 2016. She was a speaker at the first Time 100 Health Summit on October 17, 2019.

In 2019, she was awarded the Simon M. Shubitz Cancer Award and Lectureship from the University of Chicago for her significant contributions to the study of cancer.

She was honored by OncLive for Giants of Cancer Care, 2018, Cancer Diagnosis. In 2020, Esserman received the Brinker Award for Scientific Distinction in Clinical Research from Susan G. Komen, breast cancer organization.

== The Esserman Family Foundation and the Esserman-Knight Journalism Awards ==
In February 2020, Ron and Charlene Esserman established The Esserman Family Fund for Investigative Journalism at the Miami Foundation. Their donation of $2.5 million, in partnership with The Knight Foundation, will help fund prizes for investigative or accountability in reporting and a fellowship for early-career reporting at the Miami Herald. Laura Esserman said, "Particularly when journalism is under attack and when a lot of newspapers, especially local newspapers, are in financial trouble, it's really important that new business models be found and established to support local journalism. Without that reporting, people aren't going to know about what's going on in their community and if we don't have an educated electorate, we're going to lose our democracy."

Monique O. Madan, immigration reporter, and Taylor Dolven, tourism reporter and colleagues, share first place in the 2021 Esserman-Knight Journalism Awards. Madan's reporting lead to the release of a Cuban detainee in ICE custody for eleven years. Dolven's reporting showed that covid outbreaks on cruise ships more common than the companies reported and documented the conditions of the workers forced to stay aboard the ships at sea for months.
