= Kevin Lane Keller =

American business theorist

- Born: June 23, 1956 (age 70)
- Education: Cornell University; Carnegie-Mellon University; Duke University
- Occupation: Professor
- Notable work: Strategic Brand Management; Marketing Management

Kevin Lane Keller (born June 23, 1956) is the E. B. Osborn Professor of Marketing at the Tuck School of Business at Dartmouth College. He is best known for his work on brand management and for authoring Strategic Brand Management (Prentice Hall; editions published in 1998, 2002, 2008, and 2012), a widely used textbook in the field. The book examines both the theoretical foundations and practical applications of brand management, offering frameworks and guidelines for building, measuring, and managing brand equity.

Keller has published his research in the Journal of Marketing, Journal of Marketing Research, and Journal of Consumer Research. He has also collaborated with Philip Kotler as co-author of later editions of Marketing Management, one of the most widely used textbooks in marketing.

Keller was formerly on the faculty at the Stanford Graduate School of Business, the University of California, Berkeley and the University of North Carolina at Chapel Hill. He has served as a visiting professor at Duke University and the Australian Graduate School of Management. He is an alumnus of Cornell University, Carnegie-Mellon University and Duke University.

In the private sector, Keller often acts as a consultant on branding, speaks at industry conferences, and helps to manage the rock band The Church.

Keller currently resides in Etna, New Hampshire.

== Books ==
- Kotler, Philip/Keller, Kevin Lane: Marketing Management, 13th edition, Upper Saddle River, NJ: Prentice-Hall, 2009, ISBN 978-0131457577
- Keller, Kevin Lane and Swaminathan, Vanitha 2020. "Strategic Brand Management", 5th edition, Pearson ISBN 978-1292314969
- Keller, Kevin Lane: Best Practice Cases in Branding, 3rd ed., Upper Saddle River, NJ: Prentice-Hall, 2008, ISBN 978-0131888654
