= David R. Brown (graphic designer) =

American academic administrator

David R. Brown is an American graphic designer and academic administrator. He is best known as the former president of the Art Center College of Design, and has served as the national president of AIGA, the professional association for design.

== Career ==
From 1985 to 1999, Brown served as president and CEO of the Art Center College of Design, in Pasadena, California. Brown is credited with benefiting the college in a variety of important ways during his 14-year tenure there, including broad expansions of academic programs, facilities and curricula. Brown's success as a fundraiser led to the establishment of several new scholarship funds, as well as a significant increase in the size of the college's capital endowment.

Previously, Brown served as president of the Oxbow School, a coeducational, interdisciplinary boarding school in Napa, California.

Prior to Art Center, Brown served as vice president of corporate communications for Champion International Corporation, a Fortune 500 paper company that was later acquired by International Paper. Before joining Champion, Brown held a number of communications and graphic design positions in New York, and also served as a freelance writer and designer.

From 2005 to 2016, Brown served as executive director of Descanso Gardens, a public botanical garden located in La Cañada Flintridge, California. Noted for overseeing "more than a decade of progressive development" at Descanso, Brown also served as a member of the Descanso Gardens Board of Trustees until his retirement in late 2016.

== Education ==
David R. Brown received a B.A. in English from Dartmouth College in 1967, as well as an M.A. in English from Trinity College (Connecticut) in 1968. Brown is also a graduate of the executive program at Dartmouth College's Tuck School of Business.
