= Edward Tuck =

American diplomat (1842-1938)

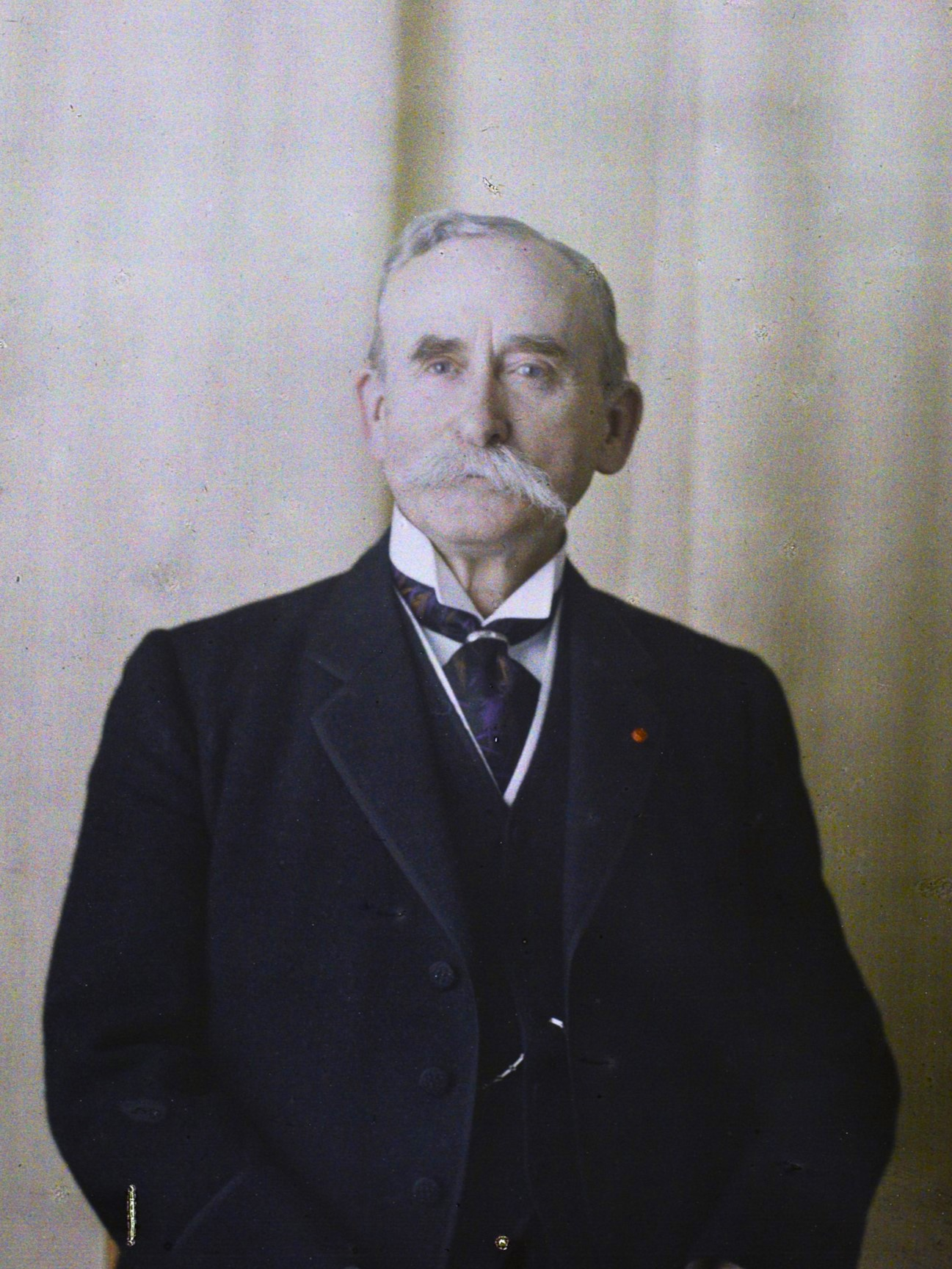
- Autochrome by Georges Chevalier, 1917

Vice Consul of the American Legation in Paris
- In office 1864–1866

Personal details
- Born: August 24, 1842 Exeter, New Hampshire
- Died: April 30, 1938 (aged 95) Monte Carlo, Monaco
- Spouse: Julia Stell (m. 1872; died 1929)
- Relations: Amos Tuck French (nephew)
- Parent(s): Amos Tuck; Sarah Ann Nudd
- Education: Philips Exeter Academy; Dartmouth College
- Occupation: Banker, Diplomat, Philanthropist
- Known for: Tuck School of Business
- Awards: Legion of Honour; Prix de Vertu

Edward Tuck (August 24, 1842 – April 30, 1938) was an American banker, diplomat, and philanthropist. He is known for funding the establishment of the Tuck School of Business at his alma mater, Dartmouth College. The son of Amos Tuck, a founder of the Republican Party, Edward Tuck served as the Vice Consul in Paris, and gained his fortune as a partner of the banking firm John Munroe & Co..

== Early life ==
Tuck was born in Exeter, New Hampshire, on August 24, 1842. He was the son of Sarah Ann Nudd (1810–1847) and political figure Amos Tuck (1810–1879). His half-sister was Ellen Tuck French (1838–1915), who was married to Francis Ormond French, President of the Manhattan Trust Company.

Tuck was educated at Philips Exeter Academy and Dartmouth College, where he roomed with future College president William Jewett Tucker and was a member of Psi Upsilon fraternity.

== Career ==
He began his career in 1864, he was appointed by U.S. President Abraham Lincoln as the Vice Consul in Paris under U.S. Ambassador John Bigelow. In the following year, he resigned, shortly before the Franco-Prussian War, and joined the banking firm Munroe & Co., where he was made a partner in 1871.

He retired from banking in 1881, and, in 1889, went to live as an expatriate in France, where he donated an art collection valued at $5 million, and funds for hospitals and other institutions.

=== Philanthropy ===
Upon graduating from Dartmouth College, Tuck made a donation of one dollar to the College for "unrestricted use." After his college roommate and longtime friend, William Jewett Tucker, became president of Dartmouth, Edward Tuck became one of Dartmouth's most prolific benefactors. Tuck gave Tuck Drive, an aesthetic bypass and 3,800 ft private highway; the College President's House; the Tuck School, and its grouping of buildings; art works from his private collection; and large cash contributions.

In 1899, Tuck initially donated $300,000 — in the form of 1,700 shares of preferred stock in the Great Northern Railway Company of Minnesota — to Dartmouth to endow the Amos Tuck School of Administration and Finance, in memory of his father. He then donated another $100,000, in 1901, to build the first Tuck Hall (now McNutt Hall). In 1929, after solicitation from Ernest Martin Hopkins, the 11th President of Dartmouth, Tuck donated 600 shares of Chase National Bank, which was sold for $567,766. His gifts to the Tuck School are estimated at over $18 million as of 2017.

Other recipients of Tuck's philanthropy included two hospitals (including Stell Hospital), a school, the American University Center in Paris, art collections in France, and the restoration of Roman monument, Tropaeum Alpium. In addition, he donated funds to the New Hampshire Historical Society to build its New Hampshire History Building housing the Tuck Library, and donated to his alma mater, Philips Exeter Academy.

== Personal life ==
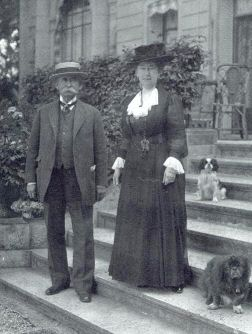
Edward Tuck and Julia Stell on the steps of fr:Domaine de Vert-Mont

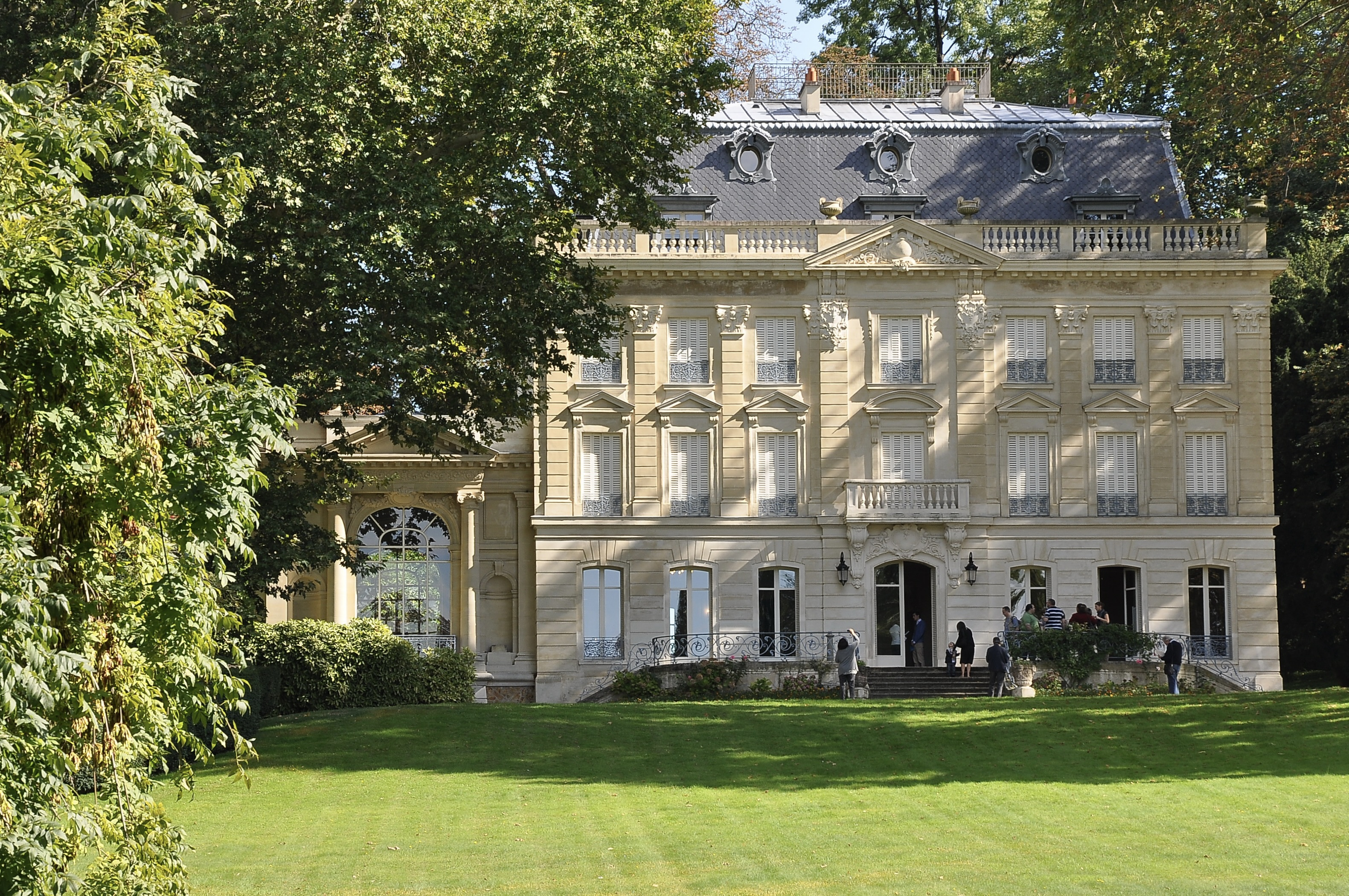
Tuck's French country residence, Domaine de Vert-Mont

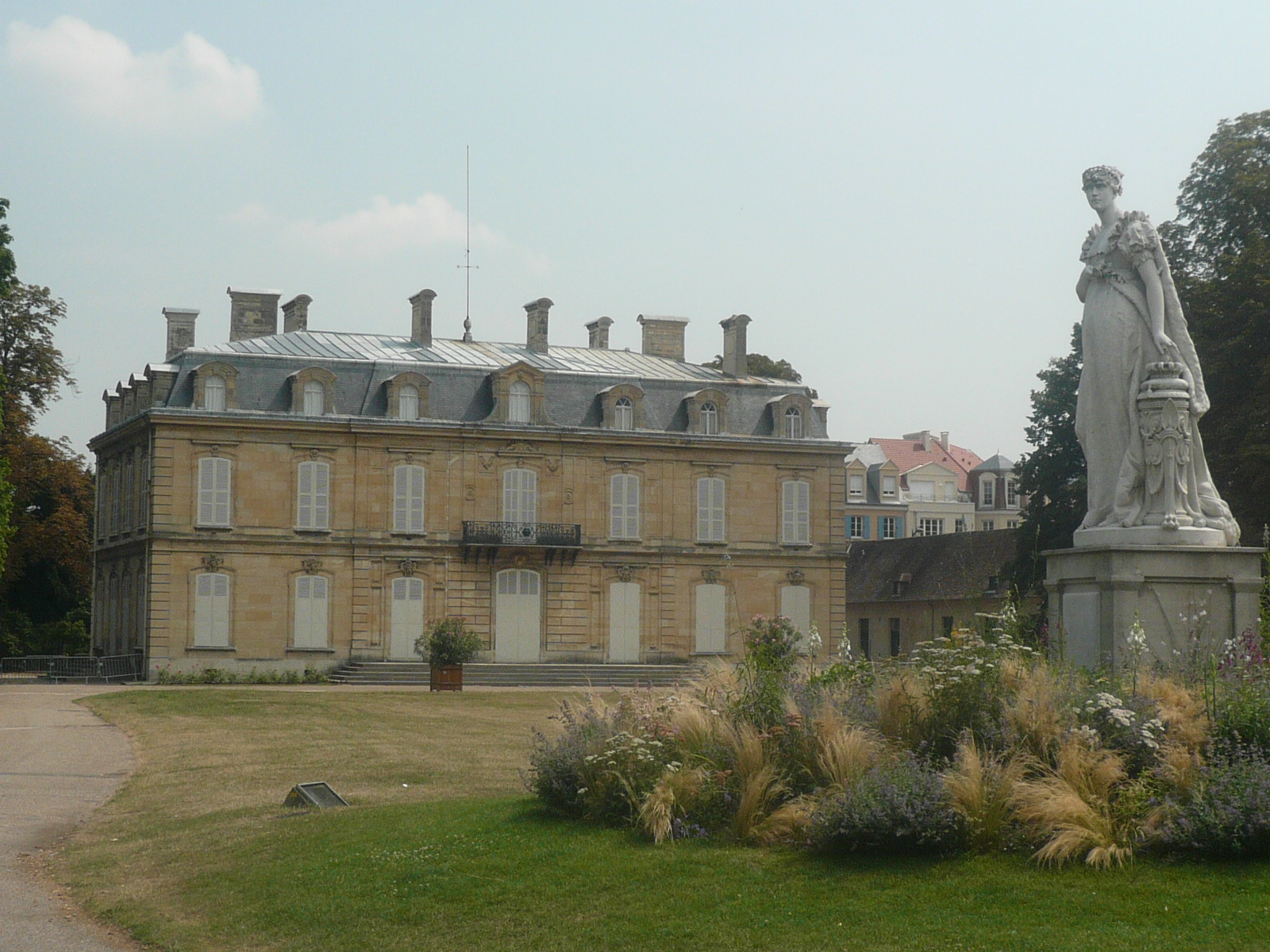
Château de Bois-Préau

In 1872, Tuck married Julia Stell of Philadelphia, for whom Stell Hall, the dining hall at Tuck School is named. As a country residence, Tuck lived at Domaine de Vert-Mont and Château de Bois-Préau, near Château de Malmaison and the western bank of the Seine in Rueil-Malmaison. The home was formerly owned by Empress Joséphine, wife of Napoléon Bonaparte, and Queen mother Maria Christina of the Two Sicilies, widow of King Ferdinand VII of Spain who lived there with her second husband Agustín Fernando Muñoz, Duke of Riánsares, until she sold the home in 1861 to Napoleon III.

Tuck's wife died on November 12, 1929. He died on April 30, 1938, in Monte Carlo, Monaco. His funeral was held at the American Cathedral in Paris, and he was buried alongside his wife at the Saint-Germain-en-Laye cemetery.

His estate was valued at $3,514,487 at the time of his death.

=== Legacy ===
In 1929, Tuck received the Grand Cross as a promotion in the Legion of Honour, the highest award in the Legion the French Government can bestow. The Tucks were also awarded the Prix de Vertu by the French Academy in 1916, the first Americans to receive the award. In 1932, Tuck was made an honorary citizen of France, the highest honor the government could give.

In Paris, Avenue Edward Tuck runs a short distance between the Petit Palais and the Place de la Concorde, parallel to the Avenue des Champs-Élysées. In La Turbie, France, a street is also named Rue Edward Tuck.

In Rome, the Edward Tuck Museum, on the site of the Tropaeum Alpium, documents the restoration of the monument, of which Tuck funded.

Asteroid 1038 Tuckia is named after him and his wife.
