= Amos Tuck =

American politician (1810–1879)

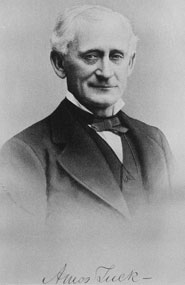

Member of the U.S. House of Representatives from New Hampshire's 1st district
- In office March 4, 1847 – March 3, 1853
- Preceded by: at-large
- Succeeded by: George W. Kittredge

Member of the New Hampshire House of Representatives
- In office 1842

Personal details
- Born: August 2, 1810 Parsonsfield, Maine, Massachusetts, U.S.
- Died: December 11, 1879 (aged 69) Exeter, New Hampshire, U.S.
- Party: Republican (from 1856)
- Other political affiliations: Democratic (until 1844); Liberty (1844–1846); Independent (1846–1848); Free Soil (1848–1850); Whig (1850–1854)
- Relations: Amos Tuck French (grandson)
- Children: Edward Tuck
- Education: Dartmouth College
- Occupation: Lawyer

Military service
- Branch/service: United States Navy
- Battles/wars: American Civil War

Amos Tuck (August 2, 1810 – December 11, 1879) was an American attorney and politician in New Hampshire and a founder of the Republican Party in New Hampshire.

== Early life and education ==
Born in Parsonsfield, Maine, August 2, 1810, the son of John Tuck, a sixth-generation descendant of Robert Tuck, a founder of Hampton, New Hampshire, in 1638. Tuck attended Effingham Academy and Hampton Academy and graduated from Dartmouth College in 1835. He studied law and passed the bar.

== Career ==
Tuck was an early supporter and donor to the Free Will Baptists’ Parsonfield Seminary. He is the namesake of the Tuck School of Business at Dartmouth. He was a leading citizen of Exeter, New Hampshire, for 40 years and played an important part in Exeter's history between 1838 and 1879.

In his youth, Tuck came to Hampton and from 1836 to 1838 was Headmaster of the Hampton Academy founded by his ancestors. He was admitted to the bar in 1838 and commenced practice in Exeter. He later became a trustee of Dartmouth College. After leaving politics, Tuck was commissioned as a Naval officer of the port of Boston from 1861 to 1865. Following the American Civil War, he resumed the practice of law and also engaged in railroad building, at which he gained significant success and wealth.

=== Political career ===
Tuck was elected to the New Hampshire House of Representatives in 1842 as a member of the Democratic Party but broke with pro-slavery Democratic leaders in 1844 and was formally cast out of the party. He ran for Congress, anyway, and was elected as an independent to the Thirtieth Congress.

In 1845 he called a convention to form an independent movement in favor of anti-slavery Congressional Candidate John P. Hale. This convention would later be identified as "the nucleus of the Republican Party." During the months following the convention (which was described by Tuck as "respectable in numbers and unparalleled in spirit") Tuck worked tenaciously to grow his young party. His hard work and enthusiasm resulted in the successful election of Hale in 1846.

Tuck himself ran as a Free-Soil candidate to the Thirty-first Congress, and as a Whig to the Thirty-second Congress (March 4, 1847 – March 3, 1853). After three consecutive terms he returned to Exeter in 1853 and began a movement to unite the many minor political factions that existed in the state of New Hampshire.

=== Active in the Republican Party in New Hampshire ===
Tuck organized a secret meeting, on October 12, 1853, at Major Blake's Hotel in Exeter of a group of anti-slavery men. Tuck may have suggested they form a party to be called "Republicans" but nothing came of the meeting and no new party was formed. The term "Republican party" had been widely used in New Hampshire politics since the 1790s. The dinner is commemorated by the tablet now affixed to the Squamscott House in Exeter. The participants campaigned for several parties in 1854 state elections, but not for any so-called "Republican" party. Two years later Tuck helped form the state Republican party in 1856 and was a delegate to the Republican National Conventions in 1856 and 1860. Tuck was appointed a delegate to the peace convention held in Washington, D.C., in 1861 in an effort to devise means to prevent the impending war.

He was a personal friend of Abraham Lincoln, John Greenleaf Whittier and many other men prominent in his time. Tuck helped Lincoln win the Republican nomination in 1860.

== Personal life ==
Tuck married Davida Nudd and had three surviving children; a daughter, Abigail, in 1835, a son, Edward Tuck, on August 25, 1842, and a daughter, Ellen Tuck French, in 1838, who married Francis Ormond French, President of the Manhattan Trust Company. Her daughter, also Ellen Tuck French, married Alfred Gwynne Vanderbilt in 1901.

Tuck died in Exeter, New Hampshire, on December 11, 1879. He was interred in Exeter Cemetery.

His son, Edward Tuck, financed and founded at Dartmouth College the Amos Tuck School of Business Administration, and funded the New Hampshire Historical Society building, a beautiful granite structure in Concord, New Hampshire.

Family and political descendants founded the "Amos Tuck Society" to promote and spread the history of Tuck's contributions to the Republican Party. Edward Tuck also graduated from, and became a major donor to, Dartmouth College. He made his fortune in banking, railroads and international trade, becoming vice-consul to France.

== See also ==
- New Hampshire Historical Marker No. 240: Abraham Lincoln Speaks in New Hampshire

U.S. House of Representatives
Preceded by at-large	Member of the U.S. House of Representatives from New Hampshire's 1st congressional district March 4, 1847–March 3, 1853	Succeeded by George W. Kittredge
