= Digital Angel =

Digital Angel Corporation
- Company type: Public
- Traded as: Nasdaq: LNCE
- Industry: Consumer Applications, Mobile Games & Communications Equipment
- Headquarters: Saint Paul, Minnesota, U.S.
- Key people: L. Michael Haller, Joseph J. Grillo, Daniel E. Penni
- Website: www.digitalangelcorp.com

Digital Angel Corporation is a developer and publisher of consumer applications and mobile games designed for tablets, smartphones and other mobile devices, as well as a distributor of two-way communications equipment in the U.K.

== Products and services ==
The company formerly developed Global Positioning System (GPS) and radio-frequency identification (RFID) technology products for consumer, commercial, and government sectors. The company manufactured tracking devices for people, animals, the food supply, government/military arena, and commercial assets. Included in this product line were RFID applications, end-to-end food safety systems, GPS/Satellite communications, and telecommunication, security infrastructure, and the controversial Verichip human implant, a product which has caused concern among advocates of civil liberties.

Applications for this technology include pets, wildlife and livestock identification using implantable RFID microchips, scanners and antennas.

Digital Angel has also researched and developed GPS Search and Rescue Transponders that integrated geosynchronous communications for use by the military and the private sector to track aircraft, ships, and other high-value assets.

== History ==
Digital Angel formerly owned a minority position (49%) in VeriChip, but divested itself of the stake in 2008. VeriChip Corporation and Steel Vault Corporate later merged to form PositiveID, and in 2010 PositiveID attempted a friendly acquisition of Digital Angel, but the bid was unanimously rejected by its board of directors.

The animal identification products subsidiary Destron Fearing was sold to Allflex USA, in July, 2011, for $25 million.

== Subsidiaries ==
Digital Angel owns and operates Signature Communications, a distributor of two-way communications equipment in the U.K. Products offered range from conventional radio systems used by the majority of its customers, for example, for safety and security uses and construction and manufacturing site monitoring, to trunked radio systems for large-scale users, such as local authorities and public utilities.

== Chief executive officers ==
- L. Michael Haller – appointed CEO on August 23, 2012.
- Daniel E. Penni – appointed "Interim CEO" on 1 February 2012.
- Joseph J. Grillo – former CEO of Digital Angel, beginning on January 2, 2008. Succeeding Kevin McGrath. Grillo is the former President and Chief Executive Officer of the Global Technologies Division of Assa Abloy. Randy Geissler was CEO from 2000 to 2003.

== See also ==
- PositiveID
