= Breast Cancer Alliance =

American non-profit organization

- Type: Non-Profit
- Founded: 1996 in Greenwich, Connecticut
- Headquarters: 48 Maple Avenue; Greenwich, CT 06830
- Revenue: 1,970,350 United States dollar (2017)
- Total assets: 2,084,800 United States dollar (2022)
- Website: breastcanceralliance.org

The Breast Cancer Alliance (BCA) is a non-profit organization headquartered in Greenwich, Connecticut that supports breast cancer research, breast cancer-related training for medical professionals and efforts to increase access to cancer screenings and treatment for low-income women. As of 2011, it was the fourth-largest private funder of breast cancer research in the U.S.

== History ==
Breast Cancer Alliance (BCA) was founded in 1996 in Greenwich, Connecticut by Mary Waterman. The organization was established to support breast cancer research, education, screening initiatives, and patient services through private philanthropy.

During the 2000s and 2010s, the organization expanded its grantmaking programs nationally, funding young investigator research grants, project grants, surgical oncology fellowships, and education and outreach initiatives.

By 2023, Breast Cancer Alliance reported that it had awarded nearly 500 grants totaling more than $33 million since its founding. In 2024, the organization announced that cumulative grant funding had reached nearly $36 million.

== Mission ==
The mission of the BCA is to fund innovative breast cancer research and to promote breast health through education and outreach. As of 2015, the organization had awarded over $20 million to fund research and educational and outreach programs since its inception.

== Fundraising events ==
Breast Cancer Alliance conducts annual fundraising events in Connecticut and New York. The organization's annual luncheon and fundraising events have reached corporate sponsors, donors, and public figures associated with breast cancer awareness initiatives. Previous corporate sponsors of the BCA include Fortune 500 companies, including J.P. Morgan Chase & Co. and PepsiCo.
