= Tuck School of Business =

Graduate business school of Dartmouth College, in New Hampshire, US

Amos Tuck School of Business Administration
- Coat of arms of Tuck
- Other names: Tuck School of Business at Dartmouth; Tuck School, Tuck
- Former names: Amos Tuck School of Administration and Finance (1900–1941)
- Type: Private graduate business school
- Established: January 19, 1900
- Founder: Edward Tuck
- Parent institution: Dartmouth College
- Endowment: ▲US$ 600 million (2021)
- Dean: Matthew J. Slaughter
- Faculty: 57 full-time
- Students: 600 full-time, 2-year MBA
- Location: Hanover, New Hampshire, United States; 43°42′20″N 72°17′39″W
- Campus: Rural, college town
- Colors: Dartmouth green
- Website: tuck.dartmouth.edu

The Amos Tuck School of Business Administration at Dartmouth College is the graduate business school of Dartmouth College, a private Ivy League research university in Hanover, New Hampshire. It was founded in 1900 as the first institution in the world to offer a master's degree in business administration and is the second oldest Ivy League business school. The school continues to award only the Master of Business Administration (MBA) degree, through a full-time, residential program.

== History ==
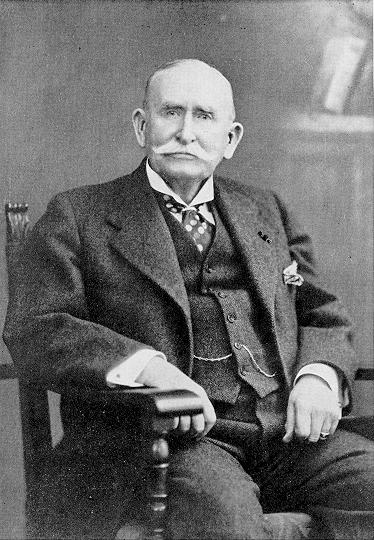
Edward Tuck, founder of the Tuck School

=== Founding ===
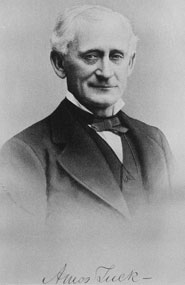
Amos Tuck, the namesake of the Tuck School, was a founder of the Republican Party.

At the turn of the 20th century, Dartmouth College president William Jewett Tucker decided to explore the possibility of establishing a school of business to educate the growing number of Dartmouth alumni entering the commercial world. Additionally, Tucker was concerned about business leadership in a broad social sense, or, as he put it, "training commensurate with the larger meaning of business", and so began soliciting interest among Dartmouth alumni.

Through a renewed friendship, Tucker enlisted the support of his former roommate from his undergraduate years at Dartmouth, Edward Tuck, who had since become a wealthy banker and philanthropist. Enthusiastically agreeing to help, on September 8, 1899, Edward Tuck donated an initial grant of $300,000 — in the form of 1,700 shares of preferred stock in the Great Northern Railway Company of Minnesota — to found and endow the Amos Tuck School of Administration and Finance, which was named in memory of Tuck's father and Dartmouth alumnus, Amos Tuck. In January 1900, the Dartmouth Board of Trustees passed a vote to formally establish the school.

=== The Tuck Pattern ===
The new school's tuition fee cost $100 for the few students who enrolled in the first year; graduates of the two-year program received a Master of Commercial Science degree (MCS). The curriculum involved both traditional liberal arts fields as well as economic and finance education. Specifically, the first-years were required to take Modern History, Economics, Political Science, Sociology, Foreign Language, and English Composition and Speaking; second-year courses included Modern History and Diplomacy, Finance, Transportation, Insurance, Law, Municipal Administration, Demography and Social Institutions, Language, and Practice Organizations.

Undergraduate Dartmouth professors taught most of the first-year courses at Tuck, while outside guest instructors and business-people, such as an export merchant, an attorney, an insurance company president, and an accountant, educated the second-year students. Edward Tuck, pleased with the breadth of experience found in the school's instructors, wrote to Dartmouth president Tucker in February 1902, "I am glad that it will be the aim of the school to bring students in touch with practical businessmen."

While other business programs tended to offer specialized technical courses linked neither to the liberal arts tradition nor to the broader purposes of business, Tuck maintained itself as a school of general management in the broadest liberal sense, to which a study by the Carnegie Corporation observed, "The Tuck School probably went further than any other institution in the pre-war period in putting its work on a demanding intellectual level." Thus, the Tuck School's emphasis on a broad education in general management was adopted by many other emerging business schools, and was dubbed the "Tuck Pattern."

=== Succession of leadership and expansion ===
Students of the first class held their studies in the Hubbard House, located on North Main Street across the College Green. A year later, in 1901, Tuck donated an additional $100,000 to build the original Tuck Hall (now McNutt Hall). The school grew and prospered under the leadership of Frank H. Dixon, who served as the school's first secretary and later left to join the Dartmouth economics department full-time in 1904, followed by Harlow Person, Tuck's first dean, from 1904 through 1919. Person, in 1911, invited 300 leaders of industry, including Frederick Winslow Taylor — who later became a professor at Tuck — and Lillian Gilbreth, to a major conference on scientific management, which business historians consider the kick-off for what later became the worldwide scientific management movement.

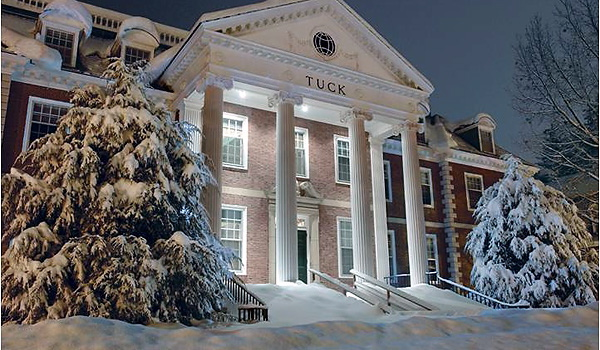
Tuck Hall, the Tuck School's main administrative building, after a heavy snowfall

Afterward, the school was led by a Tuck alumnus, William R. Gray, from 1919 through 1937. During this period of growth, Dartmouth president Ernest Martin Hopkins wrote often to Edward Tuck reflecting on the school's flourishing alumni and faculty. In the late 1920s, Hopkins sought to unify the Tuck School by establishing a central campus, uniting the school's academic and residential facilities. In order to do so, however, Hopkins had to receive permission to do so from Edward Tuck, as the documents of incorporation stipulated that the original Tuck Hall be used exclusively for a business school. Hopkins wrote to Tuck in July 1928, then 85 years old and living in France, outlining his reasons for the proposed move and asking permission to release Dartmouth from the stipulation regarding the use of the original Tuck Hall.

Edward Tuck, going above merely granting his permission, wrote back in August 1928, "The success and growth of the school have gone far beyond our original expectations, and we have every reason to be proud of it. It would be a satisfaction to me to do it [that is, donate the funds] if I could, rather than have outside capital contribute to a work which thus far I have taken care of financially myself."

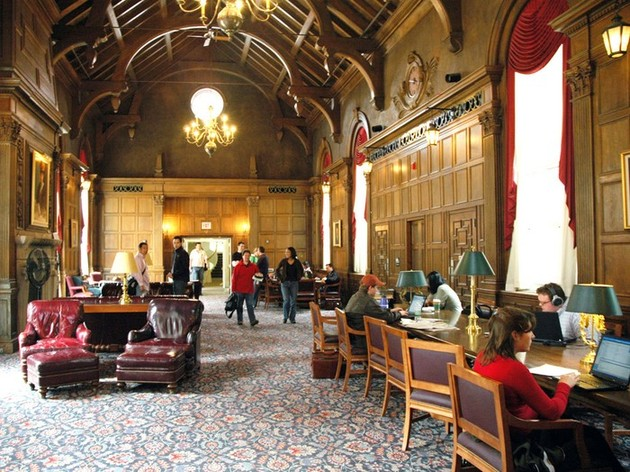
Stell Hall, named after Julia Stell, Edward Tuck's wife

Tuck donated 600 shares of Chase National Bank, which was sold for $567,766 a couple months before the Black Tuesday crash at the start of the Great Depression. On the west side of the campus, Edward Tuck Hall was completed in 1930 and was flanked by two dormitories, Chase Hall and Woodbury Hall — named for two Dartmouth alumni, Salmon P. Chase and Levi Woodbury, respectively. Stell Hall, the dining facility adjacent to Chase Hall, was named after Tuck's wife, Julia Stell. With the completion of the project, Tuck students now lived together and took classes together.

=== Post-World War II changes ===
In 1937, Herluf V. Olsen succeeded Gray as the dean of Tuck and led the school until 1951. During his tenure, Olsen created the joint Tuck-Thayer program between the business school and engineering school. In 1942, the school's name changed to the Amos Tuck School of Business Administration, and under Dean Arthur P. Upgren's leadership, who ran Tuck from 1952 to 1957, the degree program changed from the MCS to the modern Master of Business Administration (MBA) in 1953.

Until the late 1950s and early 1960s, the Tuck School catered primarily to Dartmouth students, accepting undergraduates during their third year. Such students made up 90 percent of each class at Tuck. Under Dean Karl Hill, who led the school from 1957 to 1968, Tuck shifted its focus to soliciting a national student body to create a more diverse student body. In addition, Hill created the Tuck Associates program in 1964 to foster relationships between Tuck and the business community. By securing grants from the Sloan Foundation, Hill also brought in additional faculty to the school by setting up funding for summer research.

The expansion under Hill culminated in the creation of the school's board of overseers as well as a full-time admissions office in the early 1960s. The resulting expansion in the late 1960s saw additional growth of the campus with the construction of a new dormitory and, through a generous donation made by Thomas G. Murdough, founder of Little Tikes, the Murdough Center, which contains the Feldberg Business and Engineering Library.

John Hennessey, who succeeded Hill as dean in 1968, continued to revamp the curriculum and recruit new faculty members. The Ford Foundation's Gorden-Howell report and Carnegie Corporation's Pierson report both singled out the Tuck School as having a serious academic curriculum, including newly emerging disciplines in quantitative and behavioral sciences, as well as organizational behavior and business policy.

Perhaps Hennessey's most significant changes were his efforts to recruit minority students for the Tuck program. He served as the founding chairman of the Council for Opportunity in Graduate Management Education and visited dozens of schools to recruit minority students to Tuck. In 1964, Tuck admitted its first minority student and, in 1968, its first woman student.

=== 1970s to present day ===
In 1971, Hennessey established the Tuck Annual Giving program, which, in its first year, drew $71,000 from the 27 percent of alumni who donated. In the same year, Tuck Today, the school's alumni magazine was founded. By 1972, Tuck alumni clubs were established in major cities across the country, which helped establish Tuck's role in Dartmouth's first capital campaign. Hennessey also oversaw the founding of the Tuck Executive Program in 1974 alongside professor Kenneth Davis.

Under Deans Richard West, who served from 1976 to 1983, and Colin Blaydon (1983–1990), the school's curriculum and faculty expanded extensively, and applications increased by one-third. Since the late 1980s, Tuck has continued to expand in student body and faculty size, and has seen the establishment of two new campus buildings as well as several research centers and non-degree business programs.

== Academics ==
Business school rankings

United States
- QS MBA: 22
- Financial Times MBA: 12
- Bloomberg MBA: 6
- USNWR MBA: 9
- THE Business: 23

Global
- QS MBA: 55
- Financial Times MBA: 26
- THE Business: 51

=== MBA Program ===
The Tuck School offers a single degree: the two-year, full-time Master of Business Administration (MBA). Students may specialize within the MBA in fields such as finance or marketing, but a specialization is not required for graduation. First-year MBA students at Tuck undertake a 32-week core curriculum in general management and a specialized First Year Project. During their second year, students take 12 elective courses and design their own focused field of study. The school stresses a collaborative and teamwork-based approach to learning, which it touts as one of its assets for "building the interpersonal skills required for business leadership."

In the past, The MBA program has held a top-10 ranking in multiple publications, including U.S. News & World Report, Bloomberg, The Economist, Forbes, Business Insider, and Vault.

=== Dual and Joint Degrees ===
Students seeking other degrees can engage in one of many dual-degree or joint-degree programs offered in conjunction with other academic institutions:

- MBA/Master of Arts in Law and Diplomacy from The Fletcher School of Law and Diplomacy at Tufts University
- MBA/Master of Public Policy or Master of Public Administration from the John F. Kennedy School of Government at Harvard University
- MBA/Master of Studies in Environmental Law from the Vermont Law School
- MBA/Master of Arts from the Paul H. Nitze School of Advanced International Studies at Johns Hopkins University
- MD/MBA from the Geisel School of Medicine at Dartmouth
- Master of Public Health/MBA from the Dartmouth Institute for Health Policy and Clinical Practice
- Master of Engineering Management/MBA from the Thayer School of Engineering at Dartmouth

The school also offers a variety of second-year exchange programs at other institutions such as the Handelshochschule Leipzig in Germany, the HEC School of Management in Paris, IESE Business School in Barcelona, and the London Business School.

Within Dartmouth, faculty from Tuck and The Dartmouth Institute for Health Policy and Clinical Practice are partnering to offer a Master of Health Care Delivery Science degree from Dartmouth College. Moreover, Tuck partners with the Thayer School of Engineering to teach management courses through a Master of Engineering Management program offered by Thayer School of Engineering.

=== Employment statistics ===
90% of the Tuck MBA class of 2025 had jobs offers three months post graduation and 100% of those students found internships during the summer following the first year. The most popular career industries for graduates are management consulting (41%), financial services (27%), and technology (13%) with graduates' first year annual median base salaries of $175,000. According to the 2018 Financial Times M.B.A. report, Tuck currently ranks 10th in the world for average three year post-graduation salary at $172,735. This figure does not including bonuses or other forms of compensation.

According to Tuck's published 2025 employment report, the top hiring companies for full time students in the class of 2025 were Amazon, Bain & Company, Bank of America, Boston Consulting Group, Citigroup, Colgate-Palmolive, General Mills, Goldman Sachs, Google, McKinsey & Company, Microsoft, Morgan Stanley, Nike, Inc., Nvidia, and TikTok.

=== Non-degree programs ===
In addition to the MBA program, the school offers an array of executive education and other non-degree programs. In particular, Tuck offers the Tuck Business Bridge Program, a 3-week, intensive program for current and recently graduated university students seeking to build a foundation in core business concepts. There is also a Leadership Education and Development (LEAD) program for high school students. Tuck offers an Advanced Management Program for executives, which spans either one or two weeks depending on the course.

=== Organization and research ===
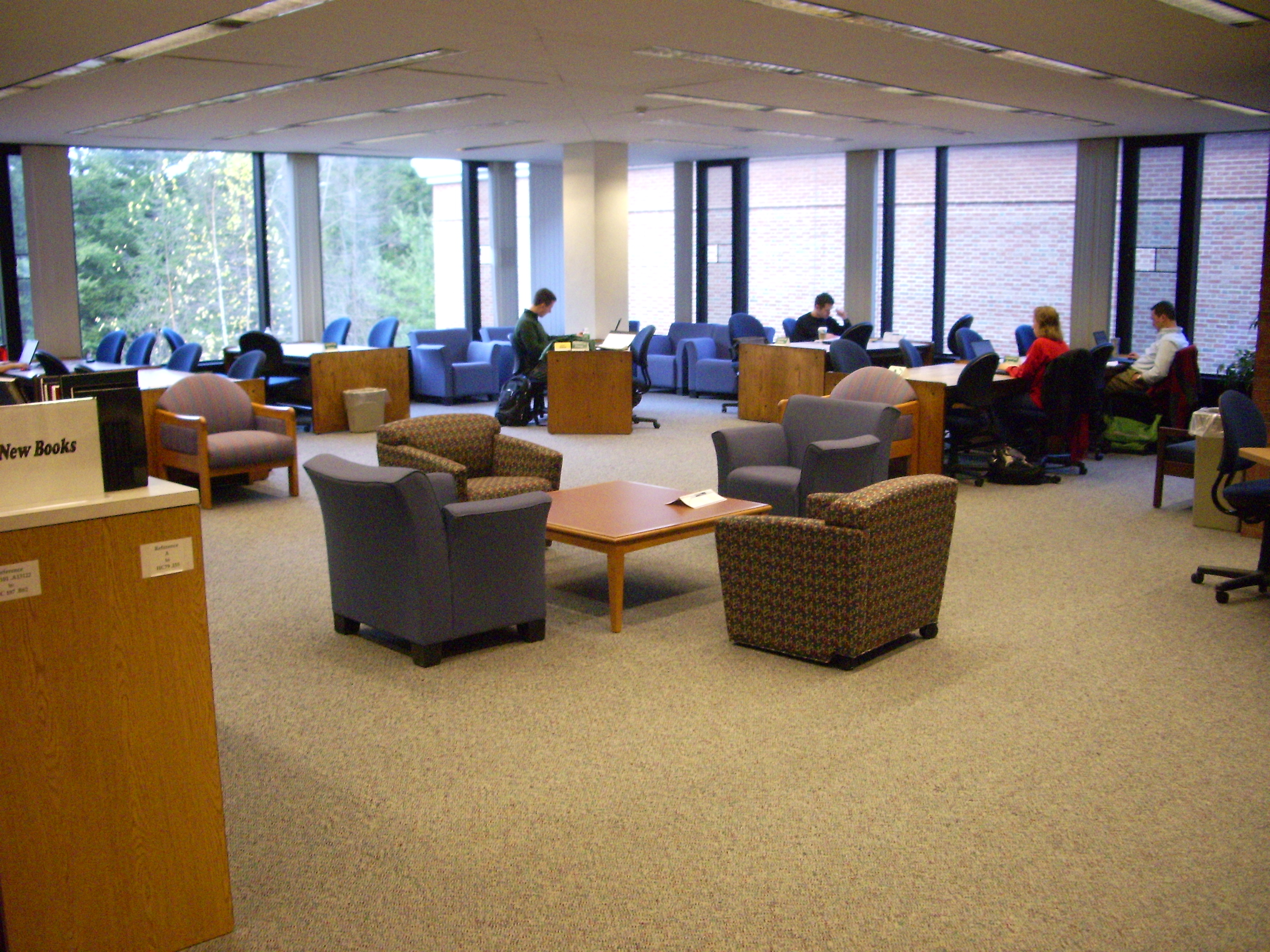
The Feldberg Business and Engineering Library

Like the undergraduate portion of Dartmouth College, the Tuck School operates on a quarter system. As part of the larger institution, the Tuck School is ultimately administered by Dartmouth's President and Board of Trustees. The school is directly managed by a Dean (currently Matthew Slaughter) who is advised by a Board of Overseers that was established in 1951.

Since the Tuck School offers only one degree, it does not contain formal academic departments as do other institutions. Instead, faculty are generally grouped in one or more of seven "academic areas": accounting, economics, finance, marketing, operations management and management science, organizational behavior, and strategic management. Tuck is also home to six research centers which organize research in different fields of business administration. The centers are meant to promote faculty research, establish liaisons between the Tuck School and the corporate world, and sponsor programs for Tuck as a whole; MBA students are occasionally invited to participate as fellows and research associates. The five research centers are the Center for Business, Government & Society, the Center for Entrepreneurship, the Center for Health Care, the Center for Private Equity and Venture Capital, the Glassmeyer/McNamee Center for Digital Strategies, and the Revers Center for Energy, Sustainability, and Innovation.

== Campus ==
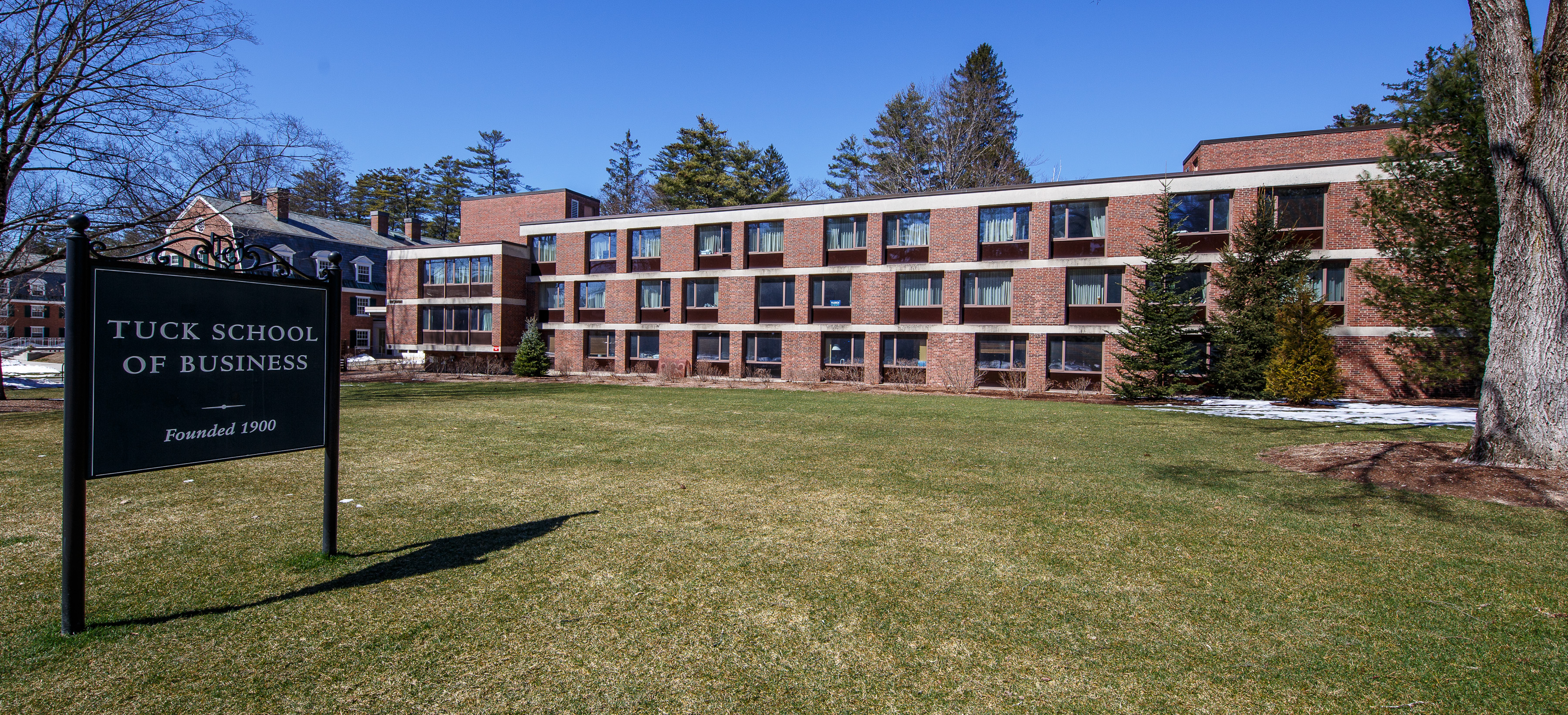
Buchanan Hall

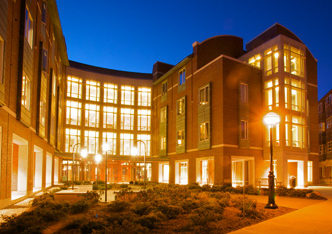
Living and Learning Complex (LLC)

The Tuck School is located on the campus of Dartmouth College, which is situated in the rural, Upper Valley New England town of Hanover, New Hampshire. The campus of the Tuck School sits in a complex on the west side of Dartmouth's campus, near the Connecticut River. Shortly after being founded in 1900, Tuck was housed in a single building across from the Green at the center of the campus. In 1930, the institution moved into Stell, Chase, Tuck, and Woodbury Halls in its present location along the Tuck Mall. Today, these original structures serve as four of Tuck's six academic and administrative buildings.

Tuck emphasizes its residential character, describing residential life as "a foundation of the Tuck culture" and crediting it as "a reason that Tuck alumni are among the most loyal of all the business schools [sic] in the world." Tuck's isolated location has been described as an "image problem" for attracting successful applicants and faculty to its rural campus, although some students cite the insular location as a positive trait for fostering intimacy and friendship.

Currently, Tuck has five residential facilities: Buchanan Hall (constructed 1968), Whittemore Hall (constructed 2000), and Pineau-Valencienne Hall, Achtmeyer Hall, and Raether Hall (2008). The last three make up the new complex called the Tuck Living and Learning Complex that houses 95 additional students as well as classrooms and study space serves as the home for nearly half of first-year Tuck students. It was constructed in 2008 for around $27.2 million. The Tuck School shares the Murdough Center (containing the Feldberg Business and Engineering Library) with the adjacent Thayer School of Engineering. The Tuck campus is serviced by Byrne Hall, a dining facility operated by Dartmouth Dining Services.

== People ==
=== Students ===
Tuck students, known as "Tuckies", typically number about 600 students in total — 300 per class — with international students making up about 22% of the student body. The school has a high percentage of women (44% vs. Harvard's 41% and Columbia's 41%) and has been recognized as having "the best representation of women among top-tier M.B.A. programs" alongside Wharton's MBA program. This marks an 11% increase in female representation at Tuck from 2013. 23% of Tuck's student body are domestic U.S. minorities, a relatively average figure when compared to HBS (28%) and MIT Sloan (15%). Tuck has addressed previous diversity shortcomings by offering additional scholarships to minority applicants and by promoting such programs as the annual Tuck Diversity Conference and participation in the Forté Foundation for women in business.

Like many other business schools, Tuck encourages its students to have post-undergraduate work experience before applying to the MBA program. The average incoming student has five years of full-time work experience, and the average student age is 28, ranging from 25 to 32 years.

=== Alumni ===
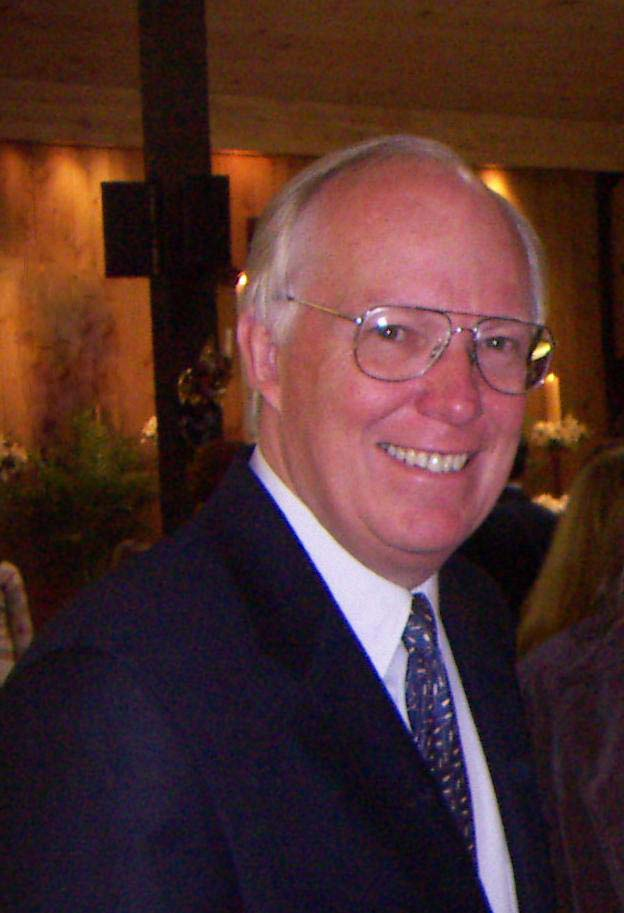
Christopher A. Sinclair T'73, former chairman and CEO of Mattel, and former CEO of Pepsi-Cola

Tuck reports that they have approximately 10,700 living alumni living across 74 different countries. Tuck also claims the highest percentage of alumni donors of any business school in the world at about a 70% giving rate among its alumni. 2017 was the eleventh consecutive year in which greater than two thirds of all alumni have contributed to the school.

- John Bello ‘74; Founder and former CEO of SoBe Beverages and President of NFL Properties
- Jim Butterworth, entrepreneur
- Peter R. Dolan '80, CEO, Bristol-Myers Squibb
- Jayne Hrdlicka, CEO of Virgin Australia, and Board President of Tennis Australia
- Roger Lynch '95, former CEO, Sling TV, current CEO, Pandora
- Kevin McGrath '77, CEO, Digital Angel
- David T. McLaughlin '55, president of Dartmouth College
- Kent Parker '90, former COO, Ariba
- Kamran Pasha '00, screenwriter and director
- Herman T. Schneebeli '31, U.S. Representative
- Kinya Seto '96, CEO, Lixil Corporation
- Christopher A. Sinclair '73, former CEO, Mattel and Pepsi-Cola
- Robert Witt '65, president of the University of Alabama

Alumni of Tuck's Executive Training program include:

- Janet L. Robinson '96, president and CEO, The New York Times Company
- David R. Brown, President of the Art Center College of Design

=== Faculty ===
As of the 2023-2024 academic year, the Tuck School of Business employs 57 full-time faculty members and currently maintains a student-faculty ratio of ~10:1.

Among Tuck's notable professors and instructors are Professor of Economics Andrew Bernard, Professor of Marketing Kevin Lane Keller, Professor of Finance Kenneth French, Professor of Finance Gordon Phillips, Professor of International Economics Matthew J. Slaughter, Professor of International Business Vijay Govindarajan, and Professor of Strategic Management Richard D'Aveni. Former faculty include industrial efficiency pioneer Frederick Winslow Taylor, marketing professor Brian Wansink,, and Michael Jensen, who taught as a visiting scholar.

== See also ==
- Dartmouth College
- List of business schools in the United States
- Ivy League business schools
