= Thayer School of Engineering =

Engineering school at Dartmouth College in Hanover, New Hampshire

Thayer School of Engineering at Dartmouth
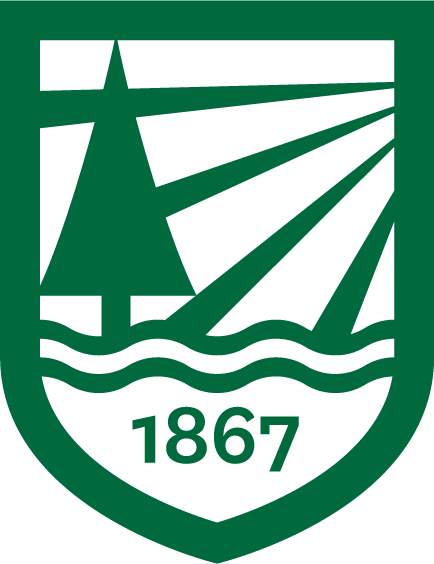
- Former name: Thayer School of Civil Engineering (1870–1941)
- Motto: To prepare the most capable and faithful for the most responsible positions and the most difficult service.
- Type: Private
- Established: 1867
- Parent institution: Dartmouth College
- Dean: Douglas Van Citters
- Undergraduates: 269
- Doctoral students: 190
- Location: Hanover, New Hampshire, United States
- Website: engineering.dartmouth.edu

The Thayer School of Engineering at Dartmouth (branded as Dartmouth Engineering) is the engineering school of Dartmouth College, a private research university in Hanover, New Hampshire, United States.

Located in a three-building complex along the Connecticut River on Dartmouth's campus, Dartmouth Engineering offers undergraduate, master's, and doctoral degrees in engineering sciences, and has partnerships with other liberal arts colleges throughout the United States to offer dual degrees. The school was established in 1867 with funds from Dartmouth alumnus Sylvanus Thayer, also known for his work in establishing the engineering curriculum at the United States Military Academy at West Point, New York.

In 2016, Dartmouth Engineering became one of the first comprehensive, national research universities in the United States to awarded more than half of its undergraduate engineering degrees to women.

== History ==
Thayer School of Engineering is named for Colonel and Brevet Brigadier Sylvanus Thayer, a Dartmouth College alumnus from the Class of 1807, who had developed an extensive engineering curriculum West Point's United States Military Academy unlike any other in the United States at the time and was known as the "Father of West Point" for his 16-year superintendency and leadership at the academy. In 1867, after 30 years of professional service in the Army Corps of Engineers, Thayer endowed Dartmouth with $40,000 (and increased the gift to $70,000 by 1871) for the establishment of a civilian school of engineering.

Initially called the Thayer School of Civil Engineering, its first classes began in 1871 with three students. Robert Fletcher, a young lieutenant, was named the school's first dean and lone faculty. The curriculum borrowed heavily from the model that Thayer had developed at West Point—a two-year program that culminated in a degree in civil engineering. Thayer's endowment had not initially provided for the school's physical plant, and for years, engineering students took classes in various locations throughout Dartmouth's campus and at one points, at a former building of the New Hampshire College of Agriculture and the Mechanic Arts.

Under Fletcher, who served as Thayer's dean for 47 years, the school's enrollment, endowment, faculty and student population, and facilities grew significantly throughout the late 1800s and early 1900s.

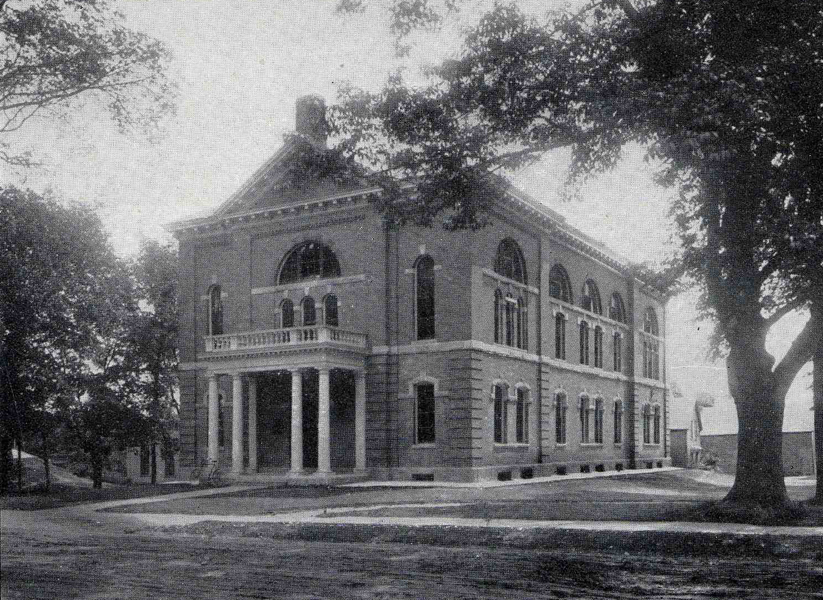
Bissell Hall housed Thayer School laboratories and other facilities from 1912 until the late 1930s.

Frank Warren Garran, who served as dean from 1933 to 1945, expanded Thayer's curriculum to include mechanical engineering and electrical engineering, as well as a dual business and engineering administration degree with Dartmouth's Tuck School of Business. Garran oversaw the establishment of Cummings Hall, Thayer's first building specifically dedicated to engineering, and the launch of the school's first major research program at the time in radiophysics. Under William P. Kimball, who served as dean from 1945 to 1961, Thayer established the first master's degree programs in engineering.

Under Myron Tribus, who became dean of Thayer in 1961, the school began offering its first doctoral degrees in engineering. Tribus brought emphasis to the practical, problem-solving aspects of engineering and introduced an integrated engineering curriculum that included design courses to provide engineering students with real-life experience in creative applications of engineering.

From the 1970s to the first decade of the 21st century, the Thayer School saw expansion into new fields such as nanotechnology and biochemical engineering, as well as collaboration with such nearby institutions as Dartmouth Medical School, the Dartmouth-Hitchcock Medical Center, and the Cold Regions Research and Engineering Laboratory. In the early first decade of the 21st century, the core curriculum for undergraduates was revamped under Dean Lewis Duncan (1998–2004), making the school's offerings more accessible to non-major Dartmouth students.

== Campus and facilities ==
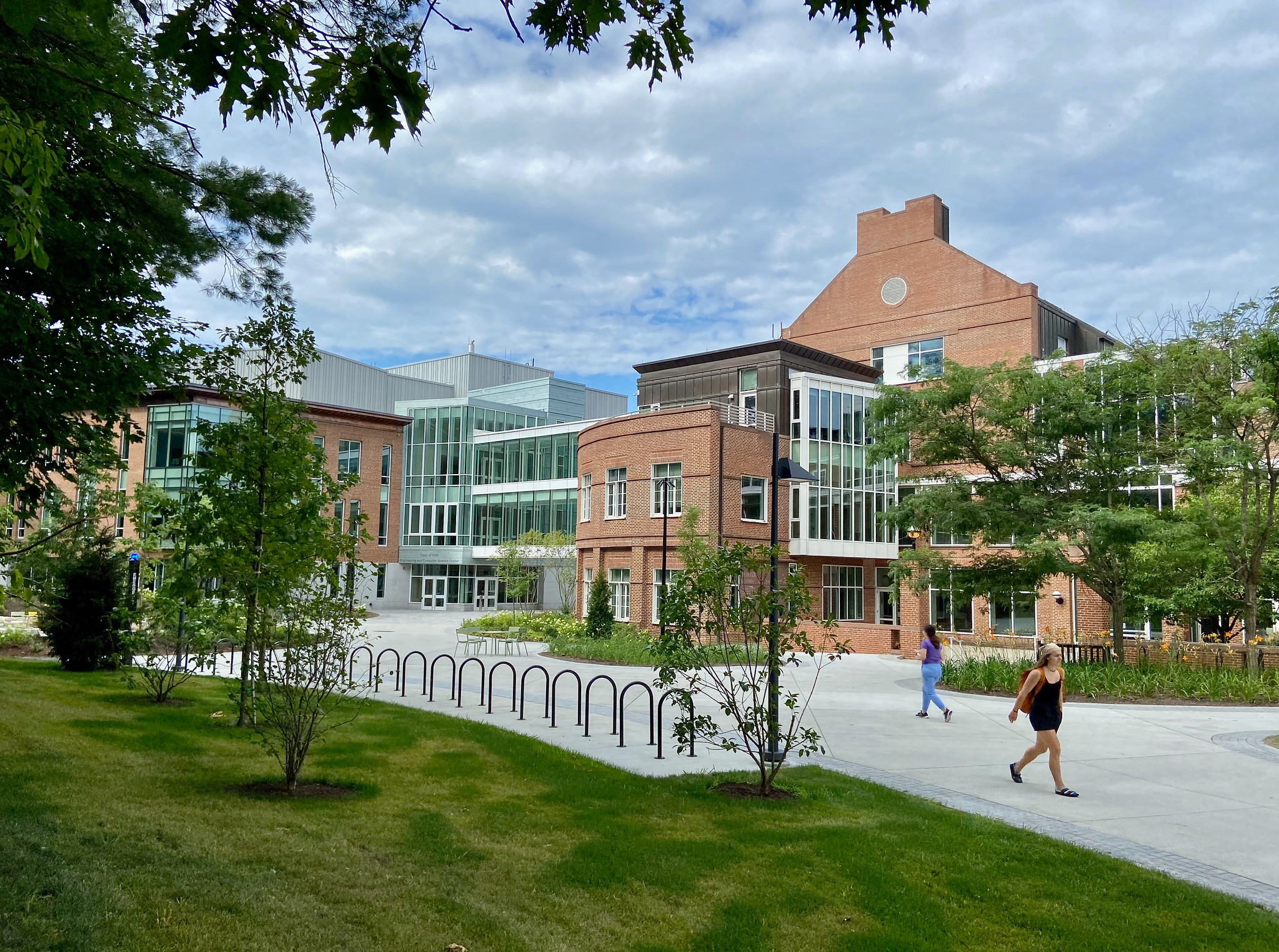
Thayer School of Engineering at Dartmouth occupies three main buildings near the Connecticut River, including the Class of 1982 Engineering and Computer Science Center (far left), MacLean Engineering Sciences Center, and Cummings Hall.

Thayer School of Engineering is located in Hanover, New Hampshire on the west end of Dartmouth College's main campus. Located adjacent to Dartmouth's Tuck School of Business, the school occupies multiple buildings that house classrooms, project spaces, a machine shop and makerspaces, and numerous research labs.

In 2022, Dartmouth completed the construction of the Class of 1982 Engineering and Computer Science Center, a 165,000-square-foot, four-floor facility that brought computer science, entrepreneurship, and engineering under one roof. The building, which is certified LEED Platinum, doubled Thayer's footprint and significantly expanded the school's research capacity. ECSC houses multiple bioengineering and biotechnology labs, advanced materials labs, and emerging technologies labs, and the electron microscopy suite, in addition project spaces and technology-enabled active learning classrooms. The building is home to the Design Initiative at Dartmouth, led by Thayer's design and engineering faculty, and to Dartmouth's Magnuson Center for Entrepreneurship and department of Computer Sciences.

MacLean Engineering Sciences Center (MacLean ESC), which opened in 2006, is adjacent to ECSC and houses the school's Couch Project Lab, medical imaging labs, ice research labs, in addition to classrooms and faculty offices. MacLean ESC is also home to Thayer's engineering-specific career services, graduate admissions, and academic and student affairs offices.

Horace Cummings Memorial Hall (Cummings), which opened in 1946 and expanded in 1989, the machine shop, the Dartmouth Biomedical Engineering Center for Orthopaedics, the microengineering lab, and is Dartmouth's first building solely dedicated to engineering. In 1938, Dartmouth president Ernest Martin Hopkins successfully lobbied the Board of Trustees to construct an independent facility for the school and raised $200,000 for the constructino of Cummings Hall, which served as Thayer's only facility for nearly 70 years until the opening of MacLean ESC.

Thayer also shares space in the Murdough Center, which houses the Feldberg Business and Engineering Library and engineering with Tuck School of Business and its engineering faculty whose research focuses on energy and climate also have labs inside the Arthur L. Irving Institute for Energy and Society. Its biomedical engineering faculty also have labs at Dartmouth-Hitchcock Medical Center in Lebanon, New Hampshire.

== Academics and research ==
Thayer School of Engineering serves as both Dartmouth's undergraduate department of engineering sciences, as well as a graduate school offering master's and doctoral degrees in engineering.

Undergraduate majors can receive their Bachelor of Arts degree in engineering at the school, and may choose to continue on to earn a Bachelor of Engineering (B.E.) degree in an additional year or less. Thayer also offers a dual-degree program for undergraduates at other colleges who wish to earn their bachelor's degree at their home institution and their B.E. at Thayer. As a college academic department, the school's undergraduate offerings are open to any Dartmouth student, including non-majors.

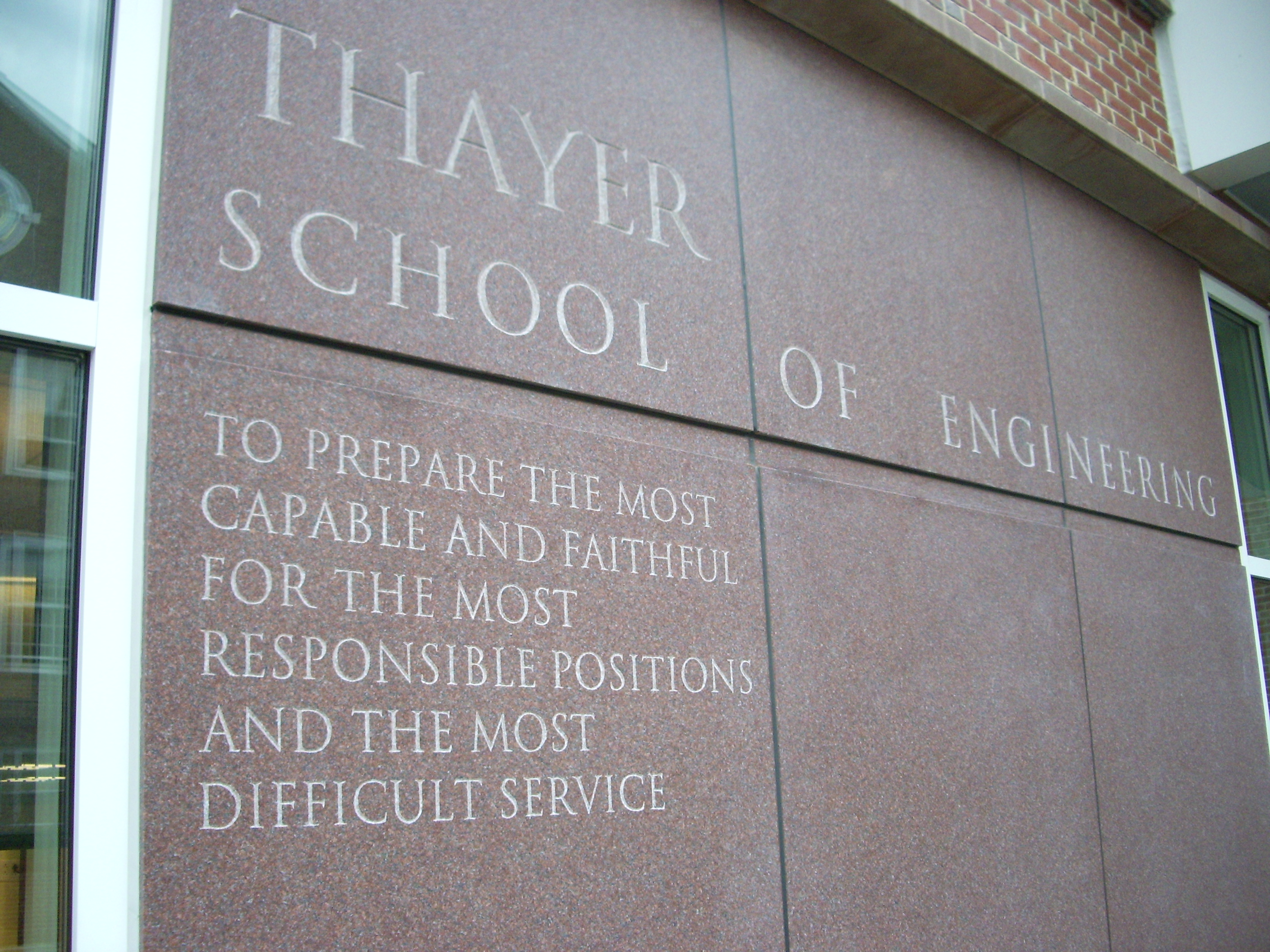
An inscription of the Thayer School's mission as articulated by founder Sylvanus Thayer outside the MacLean ESC.

Thayer offers several graduate degree programs, including a Master of Engineering (M.Eng) in Biomedical Engineering, Master of Science (M.S.), and Doctor of Philosophy (Ph.D.) in engineering. The school also offers a Master of Engineering Management (M.E.M.) degree in conjunction with the adjacent Tuck School of Business, and a combination Ph.D/Doctor of Medicine (M.D.) from Dartmouth Medical School. The school also established the first engineering Ph.D. Innovation program in the United States.

=== Research and entrepreneurship ===
The Thayer School emphasizes the cross-disciplinary nature of its research topics. In 2007, sponsored research at the school amounted to $16.2 million. Research at Thayer is divided into three general "focus areas": engineering in medicine, energy technologies, and complex systems. Projects within each focus area are divided by three "research categories": biomedical, biochemical, chemical & environmental engineering (BBCEE), electrical & computer engineering, & engineering physics (ECEEP), and materials & mechanical systems engineering (MMSE).

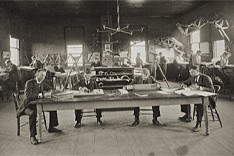
The drawing room of the Thayer School in the early 1890s.

The Thayer School promotes its connections to engineering entrepreneurship. The Cook Engineering Design Center, founded in 1978, acts to solicit industry-sponsored projects for degree candidates to work on. The school also offers a variety of conferences, programs, and internships to foster student connections to the professional world. Companies and products that have emerged from the Thayer School include emeritus professor Robert Dean's Creare, Inc. and Dartmouth music professor Jon Appleton's work on the Synclavier synthesizer. The school maintains a list of startup companies established by its current faculty.

=== Rankings and admissions ===
In 2007, the Thayer School was ranked 47th by U.S. News & World Report among American engineering schools. It was also included in BusinessWeek's unranked list of 60 "Best Design Schools in the World".

Admissions for undergraduate students are handled by Dartmouth College's Office of Undergraduate Admissions. Admission to graduate programs, including the B.E. degree, requires an undergraduate background in engineering and mathematics or science. In the fall of 2006, Thayer accepted 14.5% of applicants overall. Average Graduate Record Examination (GRE) test scores of applicants in verbal, quantitative, and analytical sections were 601, 778, and 695, respectively.

== People ==
=== Students ===
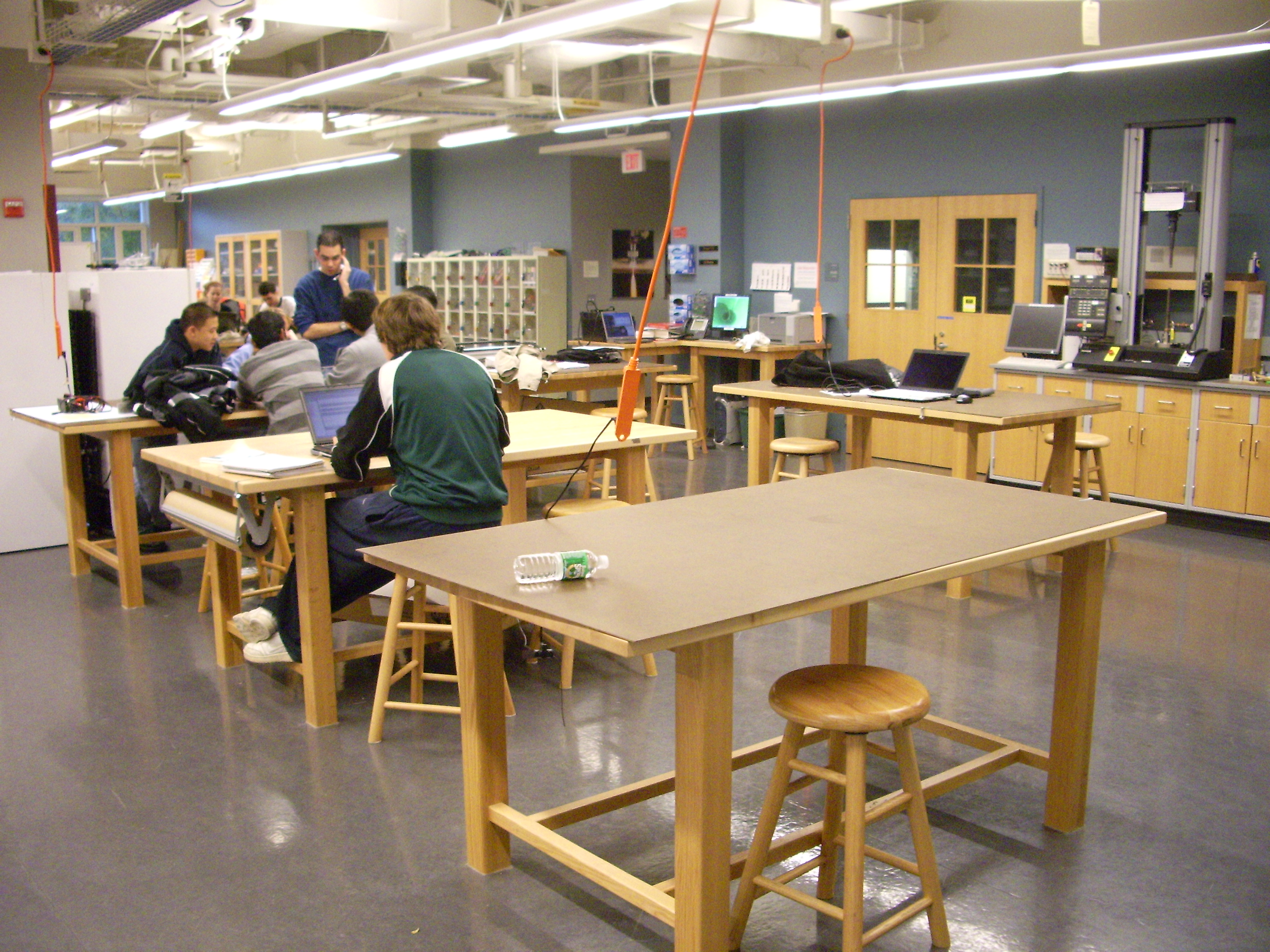
Students in a classroom at the MacLean ESC.

As of the 2022–2023 academic year, Dartmouth Engineering enrolls about 445 students, with about 160 undergraduate engineering majors, including 55 Bachelor of Engineering students; 110 Master of Engineering Management students; 20 Master of Engineering students; 10 Master of Science students; 145 PhD candidates in engineering sciences.

=== Faculty ===
Dartmouth Engineering's faculty is composed of about 105 active researchers and instructors, including about 70 tenured or tenure-track faculty; about 20 research or instructional faculty; and about 35 adjunct or visiting faculty. Notable former faculty include Arthur Kantrowitz, emeritus professor of engineering, and Myron Tribus, the dean of the Thayer School for most of the 1960s. In 2020, the school introduced a new position, Associate Dean of Diversity and Inclusion, to help Thayer's current and future efforts in diversity and inclusion. Petra Bonfert-Taylor was named to this position in August 2020.

=== Alumni ===
As of 2007, Thayer has 4,046 engineering alumni in all 50 U.S. states and over 50 countries. Nearly 3,000 of the graduates received a B.E. or a graduate degree, with the remaining 1,000 earning only the undergraduate A.B. degree. The school claims that over 90% of graduates become employed within six months of graduation.
