= List of Dartmouth College faculty =

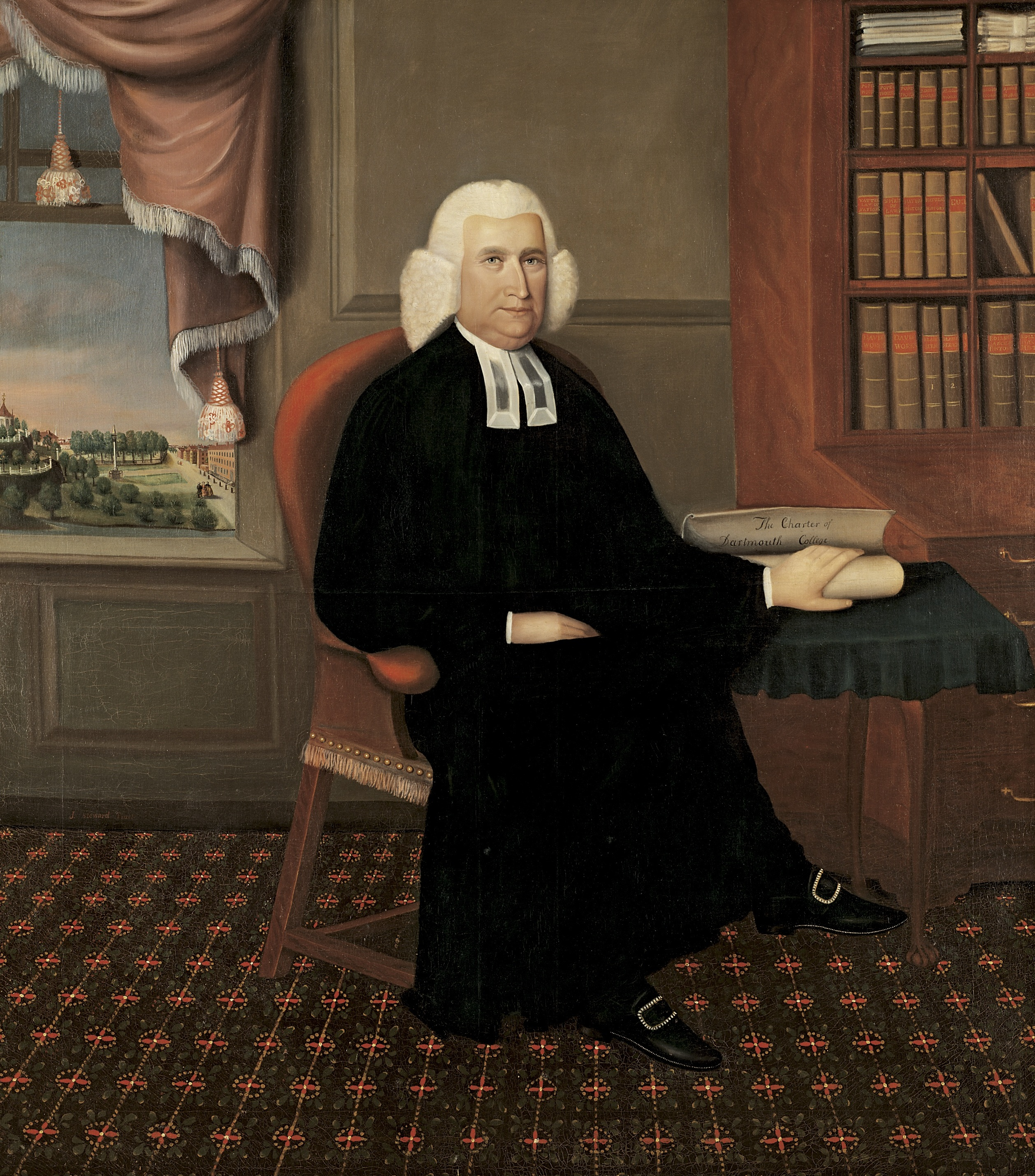
Eleazar Wheelock, Dartmouth College's founder and first president

This list of Dartmouth College faculty includes notable current and former instructors and administrators of Dartmouth College, an Ivy League university located in Hanover, New Hampshire, United States. It includes faculty at its related graduate schools and programs, including the Tuck School of Business, the Thayer School of Engineering, and Geisel School of Medicine.

As of 2007, Dartmouth employed 597 tenured or tenure-track faculty members, 366 of whom were in the undergraduate Arts & Sciences division. More than ninety percent of the faculty held a doctorate or equivalent degree.

Dartmouth faculty were at the forefront of such major academic developments as the Dartmouth Conferences, the Dartmouth Time-Sharing System, Dartmouth BASIC, and Dartmouth ALGOL 30. As of 2005, sponsored project awards to Dartmouth faculty research amounted to $169 million.

Active faculty members are highlighted in green.

== Faculty of Arts & Sciences ==
In this section, faculty are categorized by their primary department's academic division, as defined by the dean of the faculty.^{[a]} Former faculty who taught in now-defunct departments or subject areas are grouped in the most appropriate division, or in the "Other" section.

=== Arts and humanities ===
Name	Position(s)	Joined college	Left/retired	Alumnus/na?	Reference
Amy Allen	Professor of Philosophy		(left)		
Charles Augustus Aiken	Professor of Latin	1858	1866	1846	
Ifi Amadiume	Professor of Religion	1993	(active)	no	
Jon Appleton	Professor of Music; pioneer in electroacoustic music; served as Chairman of the Music Department	1967	2009	no	
Walter W. Arndt	Professor of Humanities and Russian Language		(emeritus)		
Thomas Braden	Professor of English		(not active)	1940	
Susan Brison	Professor of Philosophy, Lecturer of Gender and Women's studies		(active)		
Wing-tsit Chan	Professor of Chinese Culture and Philosophy	1942	1966	no	
Ada Cohen	Professor of Art History and Israel Evans Professor in Oratory and Belles Lettres		(active)		
Bill Cole	Professor of Music – jazz scholar, ethnomusicologist, free jazz musician, composer; served as chairman of the Music Department; director of Dartmouth's John Coltrane Memorial World Music Lecture/Demonstration Series	1974	1990	no	
Pamela Kyle Crossley	Professor of History and Asian & Middle Eastern Studies		(active)	no	
James Cuno	Director of the Hood Museum of Art	1989	1991	no	
Jody Diamond	Senior Lecturer in Music	1990	(active)	no	
Charles Dodge	Visiting professor of Music	1993	2006	no	
Ronald Edsforth	Visiting professor of History	1993	(active)	no	
Mary Flanagan	Sherman Fairchild Distinguished Professor in Digital Humanities	2008	(active)	no	
András Gerevich	Fulbright visiting professor of Poetry	2026	2026	2001	
Bernard Gert	Professor of Philosophy	1959	(active)	no	
Durs Grünbein	Kade Visiting Professor of German Studies	2005	2005	no	
Jeffrey Hart	Professor of English	1963	1993	no	
John Michael Hayes	Film Studies Department	1988	2000	no	
Ernest Hebert	Professor of English and Creative Writing	1987	(active)	no	
Errol Hill	Professor of Drama; first tenured, African American faculty member at Dartmouth	1968	1989	no	
Cynthia Huntington	Professor of English and Creative Writing	1989	(active)	no	
Eric P. Kelly	Professor of English		(not active)	1906	
Lawrence Kritzman	Professor of French and Comparative Literature		(active)	no	
Robert Kurka	Composer-in-residence		(not active)	no	
Theodore Levin	Professor of Music		(active)	no	
Grant Lewi	Professor of English			no	
Cleopatra Mathis	Professor of English	1982	(active)	no	
Ana Merino	Assistant professor of Spanish and Portuguese	2004	(active)	no	
James H. Moor	Professor of Philosophy		(active)	no	
Frank Gardner Moore	Associate professor of Latin and Roman Archaeology	1900	1908	no	
Zephaniah Swift Moore	Professor of Latin, Greek, and Hebrew	1811	1815	1793	
Bruce Nelson	Professor of History		(active)	no	
Christopher Norris	Professor of English		(not active)	no	
Robert A. Oden	Professor of Religion	1972	1989	no	
Melinda O'Neal	Director of the Handel Society 1979–2004	1979	2018 (Professor emerita)	no	
Donald E. Pease	Ted and Helen Geisel Third Century Professor in the Humanities, chair of the Master of Arts in Liberal Studies Program, professor of English and Comparative Literature at Dartmouth College	1976	(active)	no	
Noel Perrin	Professor of English and Environmental Studies	1959	2004	no	
Sally Pinkas	Professor of Music, pianist-in-residence		(active)	no	
Larry Polansky	Professor of Music	1990	(active)	no	
Eugen Rosenstock-Huessy	Professor of Social Philosophy	1935	1957	no	
Eve Kosofsky Sedgwick	Professor in the School of Criticism and Theory	1992	1992	no	
John Smith	Professor of Latin, Greek, Hebrew and Oriental Languages; librarian, minister of the College Church, and member of the Board of Trustees	1778	1809	1773	
Justin Harvey Smith	Professor of Modern History	1899	1908	1877	
Steve Swayne	Jacob H. Strauss 1922 Professor of Music	1999	(active)	no	
Lucky Thompson	Teacher in the Department of Music	1973	1974	no	
Peter Travis	Professor of English		(active)	no	
Thomas Vargish	Professor of English		(left)	no	
Nancy J. Vickers	Professor of French and Italian	1973	1987	no	
Craig Steven Wilder	Professor of History	2002	(active)	no	
Christian Wolff	Professor of Classics and Music; composer of experimental music	1971	1999	no	
Jerry Zaks	Visiting professor of Theater		(active)	1967 or 1968	

=== Interdisciplinary studies ===
Name	Position(s)	Joined college	Left/retired	Alumnus/na?	Reference
Arthur Hertzberg	Professor of Jewish Studies		(not active; died 2006)	no	

=== Sciences ===
Name	Position(s)	Joined college	Left/retired	Alumnus/na?	Reference
Ebenezer Adams	Professor of Languages, Mathematics, Natural Philosophy, and Astronomy	1809	1833	1791	
Adelbert Ames Jr.	Research Professor of Physiological Optics	1921	1955	no	
James Earl Baumgartner	Professor of Mathematics		(emeritus)		
Magdalena Bezanilla	Professor of Biological Sciences; Ernest Everett Just 1907 Professor	2017	(active)	no	
Thomas H. Cormen	Professor of Computer Science, chair of the Writing Program	1992	(emeritus)	no	
Kathryn L. Cottingham	Professor of Biological Sciences; Dartmouth Professor in the Arts & Sciences	1998	(active)	no	
Michael K. Dorsey	Assistant professor of Environmental Studies	2002	(active)	no	
Hany Farid	William H. Neukom 1964 Distinguished Professor of Computational Science	1999	(active)	no	
Marcelo Gleiser	Professor of Physics and Astronomy	1991	(active)	no	
Carolyn S. Gordon	Professor of Mathematics	1992	(active)	no	
Mary Lou Guerinot	Professor of Biological Sciences; Ronald and Deborah Harris Professor in the Sciences	1985	(active)	no	
Arthur Sherburne Hardy	Professor of Mathematics and Engineering	1874	1893	no	
Alan A. Jones	Postdoctoral fellow in Chemistry	1972	1974	no	
Jon Kull	Rodgers Professor of Chemistry and Dean of School of Graduate and Advanced Studies	2001	(active)	1988	
Thomas Eugene Kurtz	Professor of Computer Science and Mathematics	1956	1993	no	
James W. LaBelle	Professor of Physics and Astronomy	1989	(active)	no	
Jaron Lanier	Visiting professor of Surgical Simulation and Tele-Medicine	2002	(active)	no	
Fletcher Low	Professor of Chemistry	1917	(emeritus)	1915	
Douglas McIlroy	Adjunct professor of Computer Science	1997	(active)	no	
Mark McPeek	David T. McLaughlin Distinguished Professor of Biological Sciences	1992	(active)	no	
Donella Meadows	Professor of Environmental Studies	1972	2001	no	
Robyn Millan	Associate professor of Physics and Astronomy			no	
Kenneth N. Ogle	Researcher at the Dartmouth Eye Institute	1930	1947	Ph.D 1930	
James W. Patterson	Professor of Mathematics, Astronomy, and Meteorology	1854	1865	1848	
Carl Pomerance	Professor of Mathematics	2003	(active)	no	
Santiago Schnell	Professor of Mathematics and provost	2025	(active)	no	
Walter H. Stockmayer	Professor of Chemistry	1961	2002	no	
Karen Wetterhahn	Professor of Chemistry (first female to occupy that post)	1973	1997	no	
Charles Augustus Young	Professor of Natural Philosophy and Astronomy	1866	1877	1853	

=== Social sciences ===
Name	Position(s)	Joined college	Left/retired	Alumnus/na?	Reference
Bernard Avishai	Visiting professor of Government	2006	(active)	no	
Jamshed Bharucha	Professor of Psychological and Brain Sciences, Dean of the Faculty 2001–2002	1983	2002	no	
David Blanchflower	Professor of Economics	1989	(active)	no	
Stephen Brooks	Associate professor of Government	2001	(active)	no	
Michael Dorris	Professor and chair of Native American Studies	1972	1997	no	
Elmer Harp Jr.	Professor and chair of Anthropology	1951	1978	no	
Richard "Ned" Lebow	Professor of Government	2002	(active)	no	
Roger D. Masters	Professor of Government	1967	1998	no	
James L. McConaughy	Professor of Education	1918	1925	M.A. 1915	
Carl Oglesby				no	
Jennifer Richeson	Assistant professor of Psychological and Brain Sciences	2000	2005	no	
Andrew Samwick	Professor of Economics, director of the Nelson A. Rockefeller Center for Public Policy and the Social Sciences	1994	(active)	no	
Matthew J. Slaughter	Associate professor of Economics (currently in Tuck School of Business)	1994	2002	no	
Jean Edward Smith	Assistant professor of Government	1963	1965	no	
Vilhjalmur Stefansson	Honorary professor in the Northern Studies Center	1941	1962	no	
Tor Wager	Diana L. Taylor 1977 Distinguished Professor of Neuroscience	2019	(active)	no	
William Wohlforth	Daniel Webster Professor of Government	2000	(active)	no	

=== Other ===
Name	Position(s)	Joined college	Left/retired	Alumnus/na?	Reference
Henry Martyn Field	Professor of Materia Medica and Therapeutics	1871	1893	no	
Brian Kennedy	Director of the Hood Museum of Art	2005	2010	no	
George Bates Nichols Tower	Chandler Instructor in Civil Engineering		(not active; died 1889)		

== Geisel School of Medicine ==
The faculty, past and present, of the Geisel School of Medicine include:

Name	Position(s)	Joined college	Left/retired	Alumnus/na?	Reference
Victor Ambros	Professor of Genetics	1992	2008	no	
Charles Barlowe	Professor of Biochemistry and Cell Biology; James C. Chilcott '20 Professor in Pharmaceutical Sciences	1994	(active)	no	
Kurt Benirschke	Chair of the Department of Pathology	1960	1970	no	
James Bliska	Professor of Microbiology and Immunology	2018	(active)	no	
Charles Brenner	Professor of Genetics and Biochemistry	2003	2009	no	
Jay C. Buckey	Associate professor of Medicine	1996	(active)	no	
Ira Byock	Director of Palliative Medicine (DHMC)	2003	(active)	no	
Duane A. Compton	Professor of Biochemistry and Cell Biology; dean of the Geisel School of Medicine (2017–2025)	1993	(active)	no	
Jay Dunlap	Nathan Smith Professor of Molecular & Systems Biology and of Biochemistry & Cell Biology	1984	(active)	no	
Marnie Halpern	Andrew Thomson, Jr., MD 1946 Professor; professor of Molecular and Systems Biology	2019	(active)	no	
Stuart Gitlow			(active)	no	
Mahlon Hoagland	Chair of the Biochemistry Department	1967	1970	no	
Oliver Wendell Holmes Sr.		1838	1840	no	
Claudia V. Jakubzick	Professor of Microbiology and Immunology	2019	(active)	no	
C. Everett Koop	Professor of Surgery, Community and Family Medicine, and Psychiatry; Senior Scholar of the C. Everett Koop Institute	1991	2013	1937	
Peter A. Olsson	Assistant professor of Psychiatry	2004	(active)	no	
Nathan Smith	Professor of Anatomy, Chemistry, Surgery, and Clinical Medicine; founder of the Dartmouth Medical School	1797; 1816	1813; 1816	no	
John Wennberg	Professor of Community and Family Medicine	1980	(active)	no	
William T. Wickner	Professor of Biochemistry	1993	(active)	no	

== Thayer School of Engineering ==
The faculty, past and present, of the Thayer School of Engineering include:

Name	Position(s)	Joined college	Left/retired	Alumnus/na?	Reference
Margaret Ackerman	Professor of Engineering	2011	(active)	no	
Mary Albert	Professor of Engineering	2009	(active)	1983	
Petra Bonfert-Taylor	Professor of Engineering; associate dean of Community Success	2015	(active)	no	
George Cybenko	Dorothy and Walter Gramm Professor of Engineering	1992	(active)	no	
Irene Georgakoudi	Professor of Engineering	2021	(active)	1993	
Tillman Gerngross	Professor of Engineering	1998	(active)	no	
Arthur Kantrowitz	Professor of Engineering	1978	(emeritus)	no	
Keith Paulsen	MacLean Professor of Engineering	1988	(active)	MS 1984, PhD 1986	
Rahul Sarpeshkar	Thomas E. Kurtz Professor and chair	2015	(active)	no	
Myron Tribus	Dean of the Thayer School of Engineering	1961	1969	no	

== Tuck School of Business ==
The faculty, past and present, of the Tuck School of Business include:

Name	Position(s)	Joined college	Left/retired	Alumnus/na?	Reference
Andrew Bernard	Professor of International Economics	1999	(active)	no	
Richard D'Aveni	Professor of Strategic Management	1988	(active)	no	
Kenneth French	Professor of Finance	1993; 2001	1994 present	no	
Vijay Govindarajan	Professor of International Business	1985	(active)	no	
Michael Jensen	Visiting scholar	1991	1992	no	
M. Eric Johnson	Professor of Operations Management	2002	(active)	no	
Kevin Lane Keller	Professor of Marketing	1998	(active)	no	
Matthew J. Slaughter	Associate professor of Business Administration (see also in Arts & Sciences)	2002	(active)	no	
Frederick Winslow Taylor			(not active)	no	
Brian Wansink	Professor of Marketing	1990	1994	no	

== Notes ==
- ^aThe dean of the faculty currently identifies four academic divisions as follows:
  - Arts & Humanities Division: Art History, Asian and Middle Eastern Languages and Literatures, Classics, English, Film and Television Studies, French and Italian, German Studies, Music, Philosophy, Religion, Russian, Spanish and Portuguese, Studio Art, Theater.
  - Interdisciplinary Studies Division: African and African American Studies, Asian and Middle-Eastern Studies, Comparative Literature, Environmental Studies, Jewish Studies, Latin American, Latino and Caribbean Studies, Linguistics & Cognitive Sciences, Mathematics and Social Sciences, Native American Studies, Women's and Gender Studies, Writing Program.
  - Sciences Division: Biological Sciences, Chemistry, Computer Sciences, Earth Sciences, Engineering Sciences, Environmental Studies Program, Mathematics, Physics & Astronomy.
  - Social Sciences Division: Anthropology, Asian and Middle Eastern Studies, Economics, Education, Geography, Government, History, Latin American, Latino, and Caribbean Studies, Mathematics and Social Sciences, Native American Studies, Psychological and Brain Sciences, Sociology.

== See also ==
- Board of Trustees of Dartmouth College
- List of Dartmouth College alumni
- List of people from New Hampshire
