= Board of Trustees of Dartmouth College =

Governing body of Dartmouth College

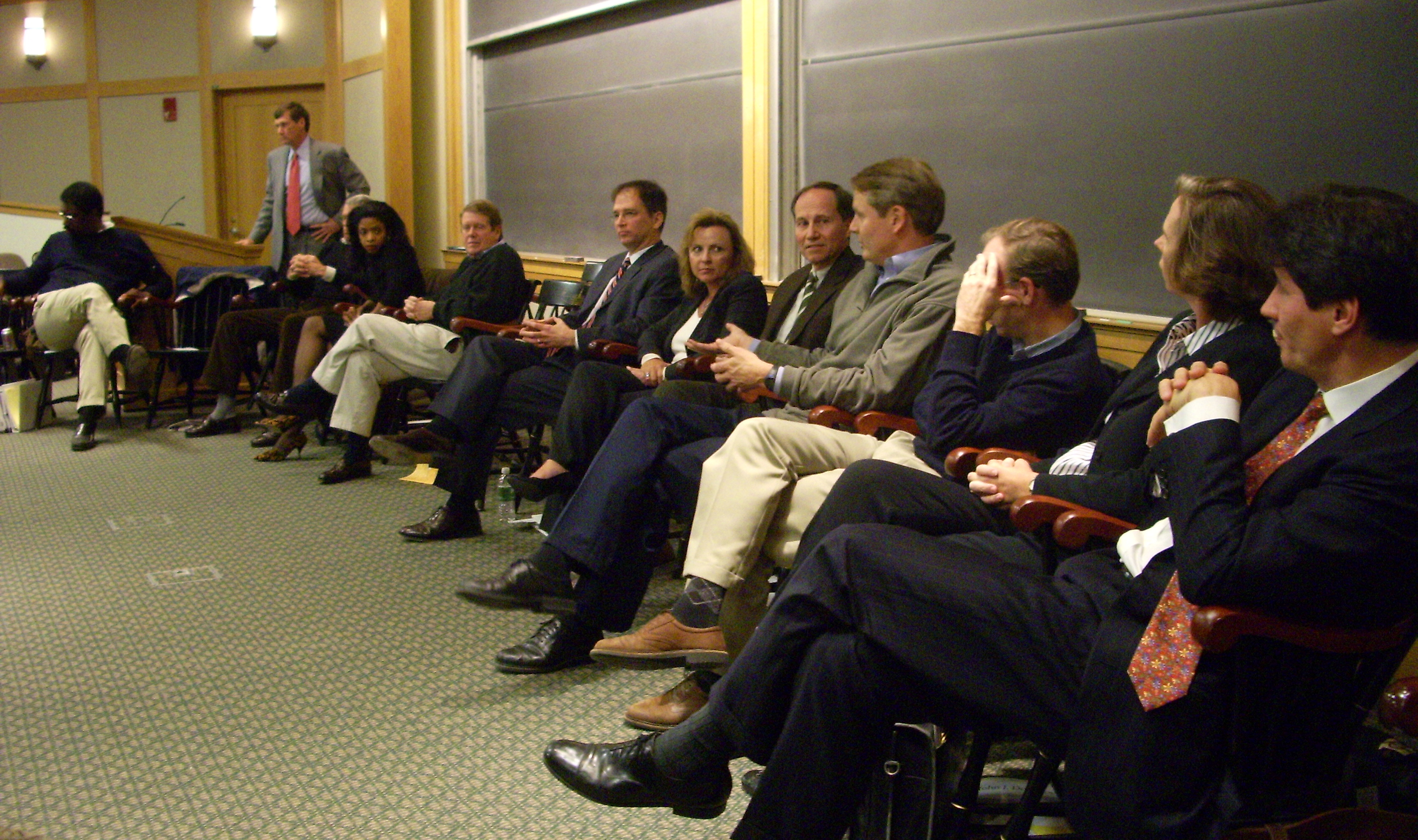
Twelve sitting members of the Board during a question-and-answer session with students, November 9, 2007. Left to right: Stephen Smith, Charles Haldeman, R. Bradford Evans (mostly obscured), Pamela Joyner, Russell Carson, Todd Zywicki, Karen Francis, Al Mulley, John Donahoe, Stephen Mandel, Jr., Christine Bucklin, and José Fernandez.

The Board of Trustees of Dartmouth College is the governing body of Dartmouth College, an Ivy League university located in Hanover, New Hampshire, United States. As of June 26, 2026, the Board includes twenty-six people. The current Chair of the Board is Gregg Lemkau.

The Board of Trustees describes itself as having "ultimate responsibility for the financial, administrative and academic affairs of the College". Among its responsibilities are the appointment of the President of the College and the approval of institutional policies.

== Composition ==
Of the twenty-six current members, two are traditionally described as trustees ex officio, eight as alumni trustees, and sixteen as charter trustees. The Charter mandates that the Governor of New Hampshire always be a trustee ex officio, and the Board traditionally makes the current President of Dartmouth College a member in a similar capacity. Both trustees ex officio may participate fully in Board affairs, although most Governors do not. All but the Governor are elected by majority vote of the Board, as the Charter requires. The trustees other than the Governor and the president are known as the "elected Trustees". Eight of the elected Trustees are nominated by alumni of the College and sixteen are nominated by a committee within the Board.

== Nomination of alumni trustees ==
The process of nomination and election involves several steps. The Dartmouth Alumni Council proposes one or two candidates per vacancy or when a new alumni trustee seat is created. Any alumnus/a who collects at least 500 alumni signatures may join the candidates on the ballot as a petition candidate. Then the Association of Alumni polls all Dartmouth alumni by paper and electronic ballots, using a preference voting system, to select the nominee or nominees. Finally, the Board traditionally elects the alumni nominee.

=== History ===
The system of alumni balloting to determine a nominee dates to the late nineteenth century. In 1876, Dartmouth's Board of Trustees resolved to fill some upcoming vacancies with alumni. Vacancies were rare at the time, however, and the number of alumni seated was small; most of the members of the Board were still elderly non-alumni clergymen who were seen as theologically and educationally conservative. In 1891, in what came to be known as "The 1891 Agreement", the Board of Trustees resolved to elect five trustees who had been nominated by the alumni of five years' standing. The nomination process would be handled by the Association of Alumni of Dartmouth College, of which every matriculated student becomes a member automatically upon graduation. Soon after the Board issued its 1891 resolution, five members resigned to open seats for the new nominees, and Dartmouth's first effective means of granting alumni influence on the composition of its Board was under way; the arrangement was described as being based on the system in use at Williams College.

The Board has expanded three times since it was created as a twelve-person organization in 1769. The New Hampshire Legislature approved an amendment to the Charter that expanded the Board to sixteen in 1961. In 2003, the Board grew to eighteen and stated plans to reach twenty-two. This expansion was the Board's first act under its new authority to amend its own charter, an authority granted by the Legislature during the same period. During each expansion, the Board described half of the newly created seats as being those of "alumni trustees". The Board amended the Charter again to expand its maximum size to twenty-six in 2008.

=== Changes in the process ===
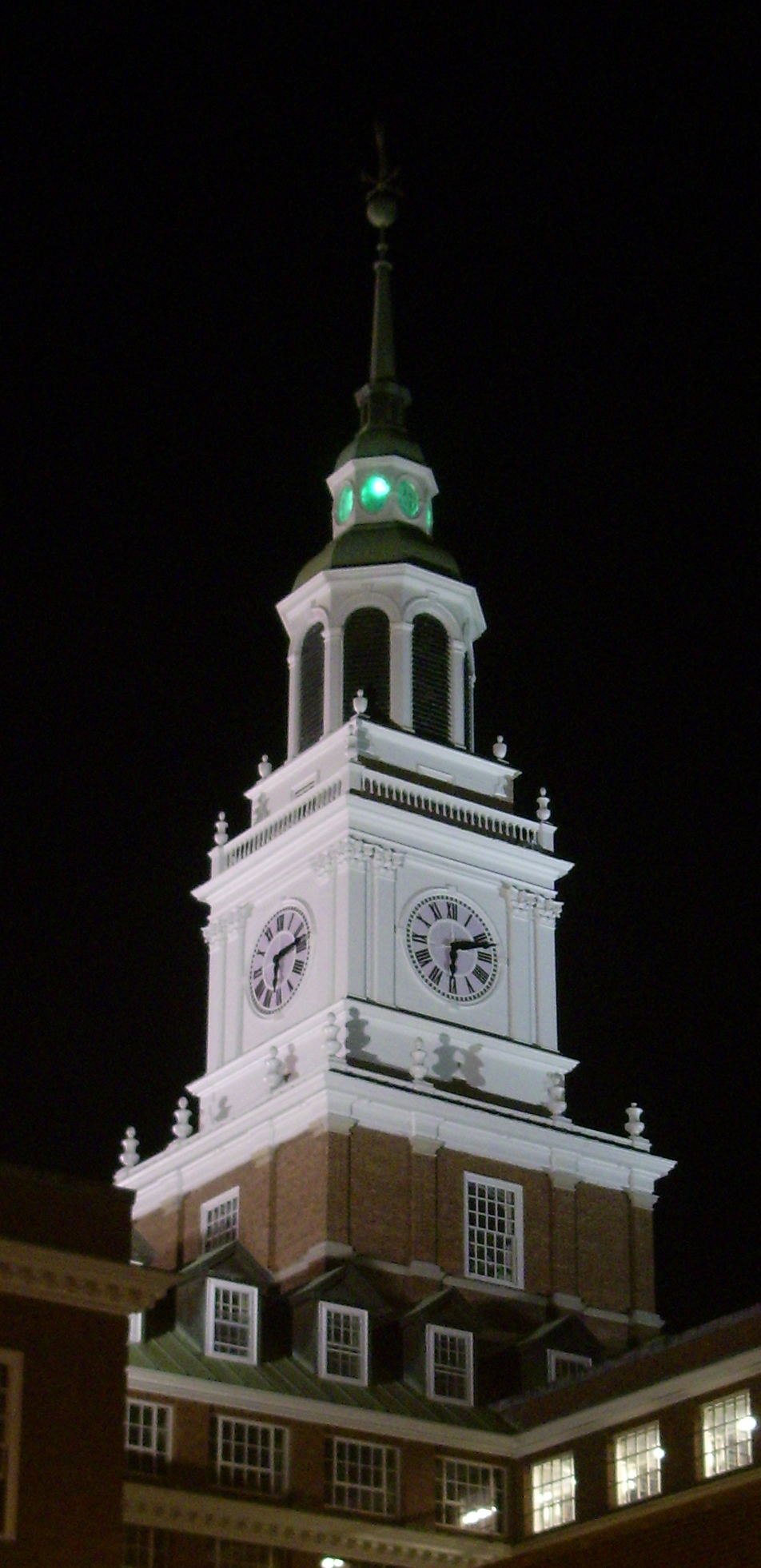
A green light shines from the tower of Baker Memorial Library when the trustees convene in Hanover.

During the early twentieth century, much of the contact alumni had with the College was through Dartmouth's Class Secretaries Association, a group made up of the secretaries of the various alumni class organizations. In 1913, the Class Secretaries Association recommended that the Association of Alumni create a group to advise the general Association. The group was called the Alumni Council, and in 1915 the Association transferred to it the authority to put the names of potential alumni trustees on the ballot for the alumni to select as their nominee to the Board. The Alumni Council retains that authority today.

The Board of Trustees has also made changes to the process over time. The Board no longer restricts the voting for nominees to the alumni of the particular schools listed in the 1891 resolution, nor does it prohibit alumni of less than five years' standing from participation. In 1961, the Board permitted the Association to nominate a further two alumni, and it added a third (reaching the present total of eight nominees) in 2003. In 1990, the Board resolved to re-elect some alumni nominees for second terms in the future. The Association of Alumni made a corresponding amendment to its constitution at the same time in order to avoid the possibility that a nomination process would start upon the conclusion of a re-elected alumni trustee's first term.

=== Recent controversies ===
In 2004, T. J. Rodgers sought the alumni nomination as a petition candidate and won the balloting, after which the Board elected him as its newest trustee. His nomination by petition was an unusual occurrence, since alumni candidates are typically nominated by the Alumni Council. The only previous petition candidate to successfully be seated on the Board was John Steel in 1980. In 2005, petition candidates Todd Zywicki and Peter Robinson similarly won nominations to the Board. Because they were critical of the College administration and were described as "outsiders," the conservative student paper The Dartmouth Review called their election "The Lone Pine Revolution" and described it as "the most significant event in [Dartmouth's] recent history". Stephen Smith, the fourth petition candidate, also critical of the direction of the College, won the nomination in 2007.

In 2006, an Alumni Association committee proposed a new version of the organization's constitution that would have altered the process of nominating trustees, in part by re-incorporating the Alumni Council within the Association. The proposal was debated fiercely, with opponents arguing that it would tilt the election rules in favor of candidates selected by the Alumni Council or its successor and against petition candidates. Proponents argued that the constitution would solve longstanding organizational problems for the Association of Alumni and the Alumni Council. Amid significant voter turnout, a majority of alumni voted against adopting the new constitution, which would have required a two-thirds supermajority for passage.

In 2007, the Board announced that its Governance Committee would complete a periodic review of the Board's practices at the Board meeting of early September. Some alumni took this and other announcements to mean that the Board would reduce the number of alumni trustees or ask the Alumni Council to alter its nomination process, and a new controversy erupted. Newly formed groups created websites and took out advertisements in The New York Times and elsewhere meant to influence the Board's decision.

In September 2007, the Board decided to amend the Charter to add eight new trustee seats, expanding the size of the group from eighteen to twenty-six seats. In deciding how the new members would be nominated, the Board stated that it would retain the existing number of eight alumni trustees and make all eight new members charter trustees. Thus, the proportion of alumni-nominated trustees would fall from 44.4 percent of the Board to 30.7 percent, dropping from half of the elected trustees to one-third.

The Board's decision sparked controversy among alumni. The majority of the Association's Executive Committee sued the Board in an attempt to block the change, although the new set of officers elected in June 2008 withdrew the lawsuit. New Hampshire state Representative Maureen Mooney (R-Merrimack) drafted a bill that would force the Board to cede some control over the amendment of its Charter to the state, although it was not the Charter amendment itself that was controversial. As introduced into committee, the legislation would have repealed an act of 2003 that finally gave the Board the right to amend its Charter without consulting the state. Mooney stated that the recent governance changes at the College were a reason for her sponsorship of the bill. In February 2008, Mooney's bill was voted down in the commerce committee, and the New Hampshire House of Representatives voted against the bill on March 5, 2008.

In September 2008, the Board began the expansion announced the year before by electing five alumni to the Board as charter trustees.

== Current trustees ==
As of June 2026, Dartmouth's current trustees are as follows:

=== Alumni trustees ===
Name	Elected	Graduated
Susan Finegan	2020	1985
Odette Harris	2020	1991
Sarah Harris	2026	2000
Maia Josebachvili	2024	2005
Gregg Lemkau	2020	1991
Peter Roby	2026	1979
Joyce Sackey	2021	1985, MED'89
Hilary Tompkins	2019	1990, H'19

=== Ex officio trustees ===
Name	Office	Appointed
Sian Leah Beilock	President, Dartmouth College	2023
Kelly Ayotte	Governor, State of New Hampshire	2025

=== Charter trustees ===
Name	Elected	Graduated
Constance Britton	2019	1989
Barry Caldwell	2025	1982
James "Jim" Frank	2019	1965
David J. Grain	2024	T'1979
Will Griffith	2024	1993
Susie Huang	2020	1984
Neal Katyal	2021	1991
David McKenna	2023	1989
M. Hadley Mullin	2025	1996
Jane Pfaff	2022	1992
Shonda Rhimes	2023	1991, H'14
Todd Sisitsky	2023	1993
Holden Spaht	2026	1996
Scott Stuart	2021	1981
Jake Tapper	2022	1991, H'17
William "Bill" Tyree	2026	1985

== Notable past trustees ==
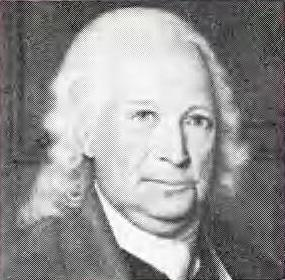
John Phillips, founder of Phillips Exeter Academy, trustee from 1773–1793.

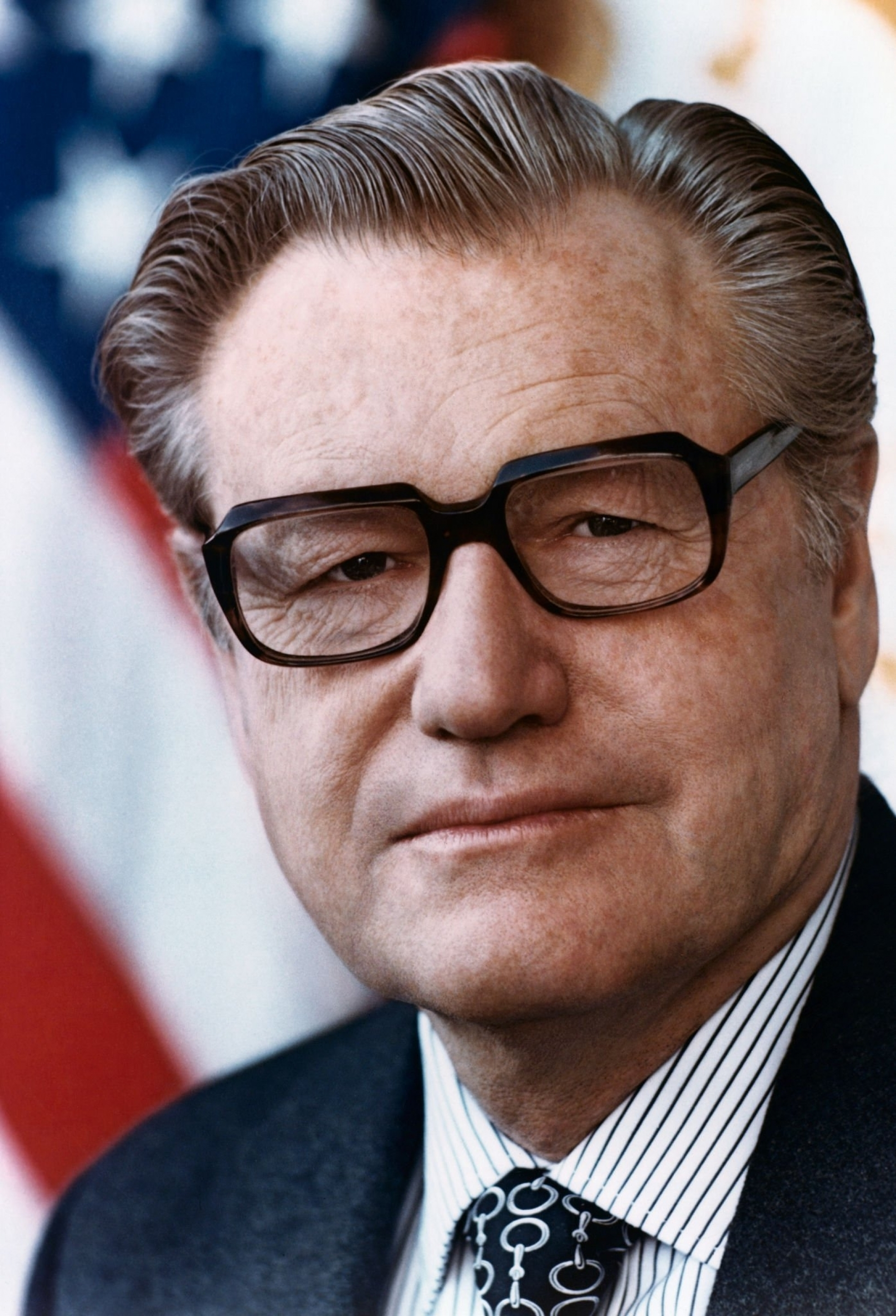
Nelson Rockefeller '30, Vice President of the United States, trustee from 1942–1952.

Name	Elected	Left/retired	Graduated	Reference
Leon Black	2002	2011	1973	
Stephen W. Bosworth	1992	2002	1961	
Thomas Braden	1964	1974	1941	
Albert O. Brown	1911	1931	1878	
Anthony Colby	1850	1870	n/a	
Susan Dentzer	1993	2004	1977	
John Donahoe	2003	2012	1982	
Ira Allen Eastman	1859	1881	1829	
Jose W. Fernandez	2003	2009	1977	
Marye Anne Fox	2011	2013	1974 Ph.D	
Jonathan Freeman	1793	1808	n/a	
Charles E. Haldeman	2004	2012	1970	
Ira Michael Heyman	1982	1993	1951	
Charles Marsh	1809	1849	1786	
David T. McLaughlin	1971	1981	1954, T'55	
George Munroe	1977	1991	1943	
Nathaniel Niles	1793	1821	n/a	
Robert Oelman	1961	1976	1931	
Simeon Olcott	1784	1793	n/a	
Elijah Paine	1806	1829	n/a	
John Phillips	1773	1793	n/a	
Timothy Pitkin	1769	1773	n/a	
Samuel L. Powers	1905	1915	1874	
Benjamin F. Prescott	1879	1895	1856	
William Reed	1834	1837	n/a	
Trevor Rees-Jones	2010	2014	1973	
Robert Reich	1988	1993	1968	
Peter Robinson	2005	2013	1979	
Nelson Rockefeller	1942	1952	1930	
T.J. Rodgers	2004	2012	1970	
Beardsley Ruml	1946	1960	1915	
David K. Shipler	1993	2003	1964	
John Smith	1788	1809	1773	
Kate Stith	1989	2000	1973	
Thomas W. Thompson	1801	1821	n/a	
Amos Tuck	1857	1866	1835	
Todd Zywicki	2005	2009	1988	
