= Coron Williams =

American basketball player (born 1989)

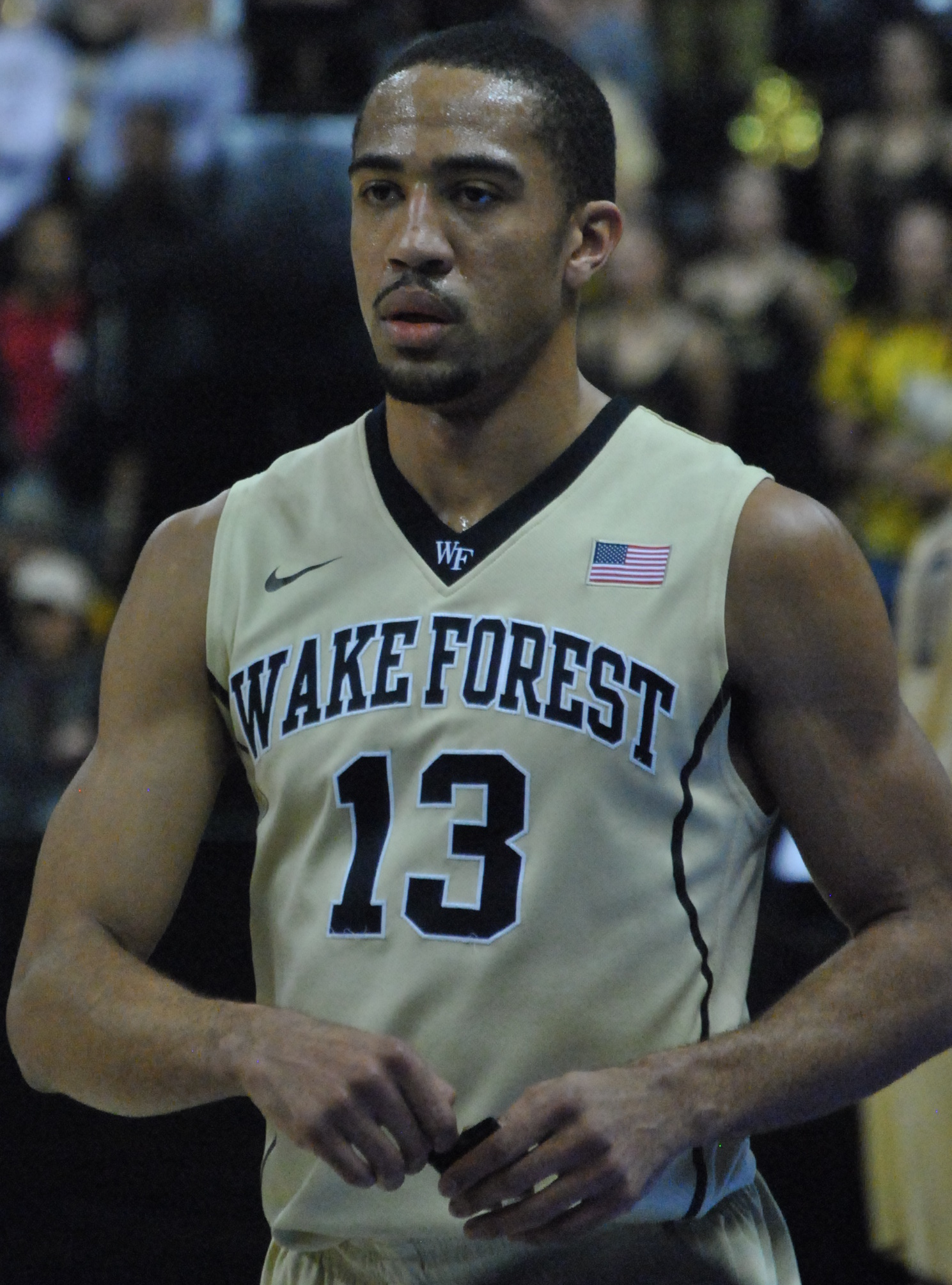
- Williams with Wake Forest in 2014

Personal information
- Born: November 23, 1989 (age 36) Italy
- Listed height: 6 ft 0 in (1.83 m)
- Listed weight: 175 lb (79 kg)

Career information
- High school: Christchurch School (Christchurch, Virginia)
- College: Robert Morris (2009–2013); Wake Forest (2013–2014)
- NBA draft: 2014: undrafted
- Playing career: 2014–2021
- Position: Point guard

Career history
- 2014–2015: Universo Treviso
- 2015–2017: Maine Red Claws
- 2017: Greensboro Swarm
- 2017–2018: St. John's Edge
- 2018–2019: La Union de Formosa
- 2019–2020: Dorados de Chihuahua
- 2020–2021: Libertadores de Querétaro

Coron Williams (born November 23, 1989) is an American former professional basketball player who most recently played for Libertadores de Querétaro of the Liga Nacional de Baloncesto Profesional (LNBP). He played college basketball for the Robert Morris Colonials and Wake Forest Demon Deacons. He attended Christchurch School in high school. Professionally, he has competed for the Maine Red Claws and Greensboro Swarm in the NBA G League but represented the Italian team Universo Treviso Basket in his rookie season.

== Early life ==
Williams was born in Italy to mother Bragail Williams-Brown and father Carl Williams, who served in the military. At age three, he moved with his family to South Carolina, and at age six, he moved to Virginia. As a senior at the Christchurch School, he averaged 19 points, five rebounds, three assists and three steals as a senior.

== College career ==
Williams played three games as a freshman in 2009–10 before sitting out with an ankle injury. As a redshirt freshman, he averaged 7.1 points per game and shot 47 percent from 3-point range. Williams posted 10.8 points per game while shooting 41 percent from 3-point range as a redshirt sophomore. As a redshirt junior, he scored 9.1 points per game while shooting 42 percent from behind the arc. His best game was a 27-point outing against Fairleigh Dickinson. Williams helped the Colonials to a 24–11 season in 2012–13 and the NIT appearance, in which they beat Kentucky 59–57 in the first round. After the season he opted to transfer to Wake Forest Demon Deacons. In his final season at Wake Forest, Williams averaged 10.2 points, 2.2 rebounds and 1.2 assists per game.

== Professional career ==
In August 2014, Williams signed a deal with the Italian club Universo Treviso Basket. He played two seasons with the Maine Red Claws and briefly joined the Greensboro Swarm in 2017. Afterwards he signed with the St. John's Edge of the National Basketball League of Canada (NBLC). The Edge reached the league finals in his first season, and he was player of the game with 28 points in Game 4 versus the London Lightning. He averaged 14 points per game. On July 18, 2018, Williams signed with La Union de Formosa of the Argentine Liga Nacional de Básquet.

== The Basketball Tournament ==
Coron Williams played for Team Wake The Nation in the 2018 edition of The Basketball Tournament. He had five points, two rebounds and three assists in the team's first-round loss to Team Showtime.
