= Peter Travis =

Peter Travis may refer to:

- Peter Travis (medieval scholar), American academic
- Peter Travis (Canadian football) (born 1945), Canadian football player
- Pete Travis, British television and film director
