= Teddy Okereafor =

British basketball player

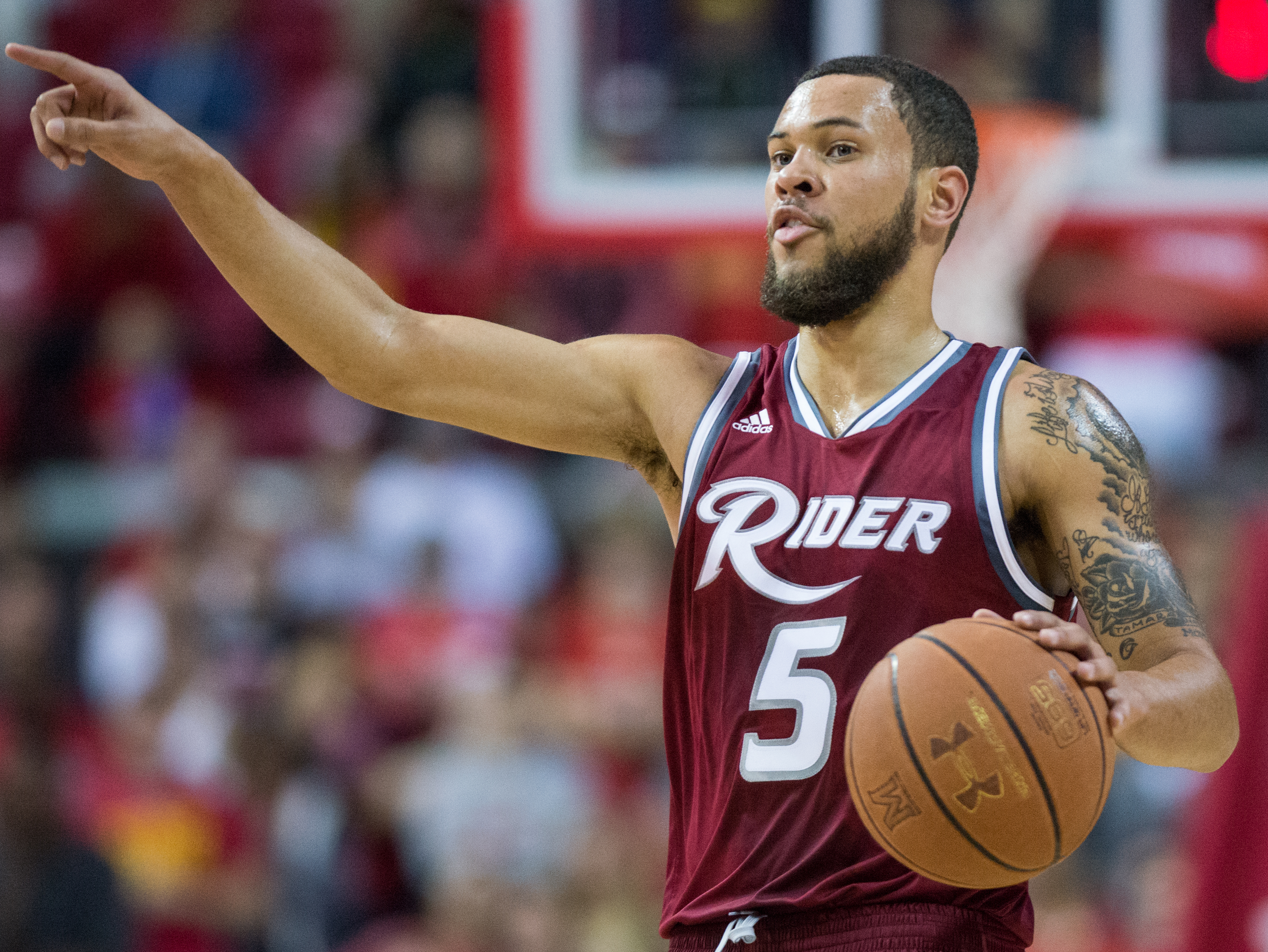

Personal information
- Born: 11 November 1992 (age 34) London, England
- Listed height: 6 ft 4 in (1.93 m)
- Listed weight: 193 lb (88 kg)

Career information
- High school: Christchurch (Christchurch, Virginia)
- College: VCU (2011–2013); Rider (2014–2016)
- NBA draft: 2016: undrafted
- Playing career: 2016–present
- Position: Point guard

Career history
- 2016: Pärnu
- 2016–2017: Pistoia 2000
- 2017–2018: Kymis
- 2018: Fortitudo Bologna
- 2018–2019: Holargos
- 2019–2020: Iraklis
- 2020–2021: Bristol Flyers
- 2021–2022: Cheshire Phoenix
- 2022–2023: Apollon Limassol
- 2023–2024: Slavia Prague
- 2024–2025: Caledonia Gladiators

Career highlights
- Second-team All-MAAC (2015); Third-team All-MAAC (2016)

Teddy Okereafor (born 11 November 1992) is a British professional basketball player. Okereafor played college basketball for Virginia Commonwealth University and Rider University. He is also a member of the Great Britain Men's National team.

== High school career ==
Okereafor attended the Christchurch School in Christchurch, Virginia where he led his high school team to a 23-6 record as the Virginia Prep League Player of the Year. He earned First Team All-State, averaging 13.1 points and 7.2 assists.

== College career ==
After graduating from Christchurch School, Okereafor played two years of college basketball for VCU. After the 2012–13 season, Dillard transferred to Rider. He had to sit out one season under NCAA rules. He was named to the All-MAAC Second Team, as a junior and to the All-MAAC Third Team, as a senior.

== Professional career ==
Okereafor went undrafted in the 2016 NBA draft. On 2 November 2016 he signed a one-year deal with Pärnu of the Korvpalli Meistriliiga. On 2 December 2016 he left Pärnu and joined Pistoia 2000, signing a short-term deal with the club.

On 17 August 2017 he signed with Kymis of Greece for the 2017–18 season. Okereafor finished out the season with Fortitudo Bologna.

On 28 June 2018 he signed with Holargos of the Greek Basket League.

On 25 August 2019 Okereafor signed with Iraklis; on 26 February 2020 he was released from the Greek club.

On 18 November 2020 Okereafor signed a short-term contract with the Bristol Flyers for the 2020–21 BBL season. On 25 May 2021 he signed with the Cheshire Phoenix.

On 14th of December 2024 Okereafor signed with Caledonia Gladiators for the rest of the 24/25 season

== National team career ==
Okereafor made his debut for the Great Britain Men's National Team in a closed international test match against New Zealand in 2015. Since then, Teddy has featured in every game Great Britain has played. He participated at EuroBasket 2017 and was one of the best players for Great Britain, averaging 9.6 points, 4.8 assists, and 4.2 rebounds per game.
