= Lorna Simpson =

American photographer and multimedia artist

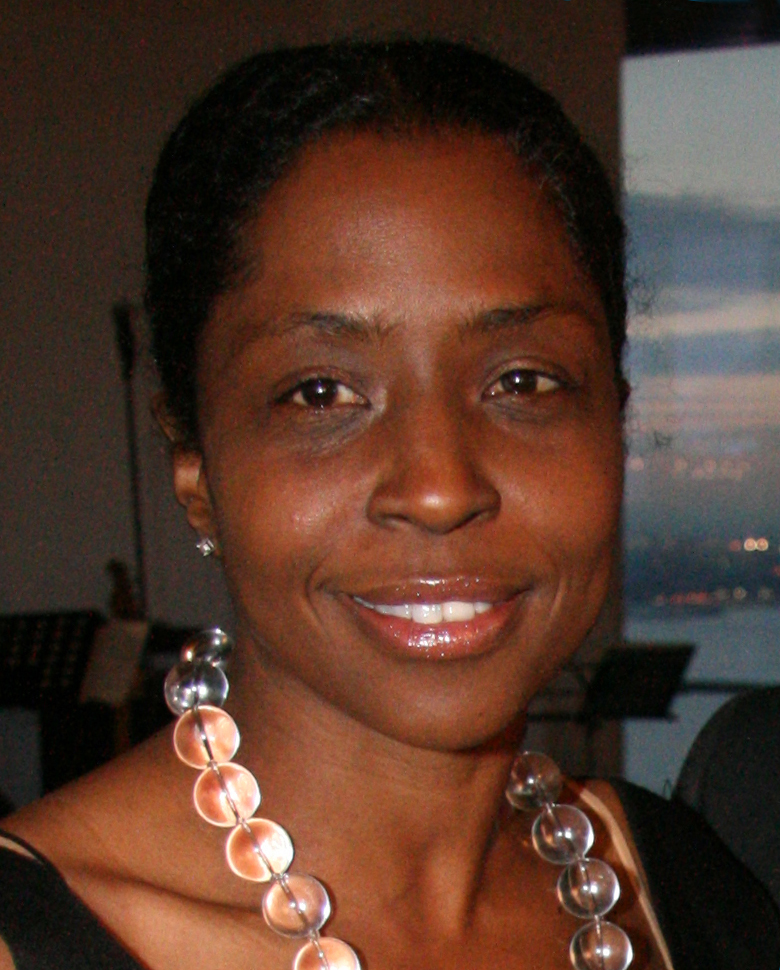
- Simpson in April 2009
- Born: Lorna Simpson; 13 August 1960 (age 66); Brooklyn, New York
- Education: University of California-San Diego, MFA, 1985; School of Visual Arts, New York City, BFA, 1983
- Known for: Photography, Film, Video
- Movement: Conceptual photography
- Awards: 2010 ICP Infinity Award in Art, International Center of Photography, New York City; 2019 J. Paul Getty Medal
- Website: lsimpsonstudio.com

Lorna Simpson (born August 13, 1960) is an American photographer and multimedia artist whose works have been exhibited both nationally and internationally. In 1990, she became one of the first African-American women to exhibit at the Venice Biennale. She came to prominence in the 1980s and 1990s with photo-text installations such as Guarded Conditions and Square Deal that questioned the nature of identity, gender, race, history and representation. Simpson continues to explore these themes in relation to memory and history using photography, film, video, painting, drawing, audio, and sculpture.

== Early life ==
Lorna Simpson was born on August 13, 1960, and grew up in Queens and Brooklyn, New York. Her parents, a Jamaican-Cuban father and African-American mother, took her to numerous plays, museums, concerts and dance performances as a child. Simpson attended the High School of Art and Design and took courses at the Art Institute of Chicago in summer while visiting her grandmother.

== Education ==
Prior to receiving her BFA, Simpson traveled Europe, Africa, and the United States further developing her skills through documentary photography. Simpson attended the School of Visual Arts in New York City and received a Bachelor of Fine Arts in Painting in 1982. During that time, she interned at the Studio Museum in Harlem, acquainting herself with the practice of artist in residence David Hammons.

Simpson earned her Master of Fine Arts degree from the University of California at San Diego in 1985. Her focus was between Photography and Conceptual art, and her teachers included Allan Kaprow, Eleanor Antin, filmmakers Babette Mangolte, Jean-Pierre Gorin and poet David Antin. Here she developed her signature style of combining text with studio-like portraiture, while questioning if documentary photography was factual or served as a constructed truth generated by photographer themselves. These works analyzed stereotypical narratives of African-American women within American culture.

== Career ==
Simpson was awarded a National Endowment for the Arts Fellowship in 1985, and in 1990, she became one of the first African-American woman to exhibit at the Venice Biennale. She was also the first African American woman to have a solo exhibition in the Museum of Modern Art with her Projects 23 exhibition. In 1990, Simpson had one woman exhibitions at several major museums, including the Denver Art Museum, the Portland Art Museum, and the Museum of Modern Art. At the same time, her work was included in The Decade Show: Frameworks of Identity in the 1980s, an exhibition presented by The Museum of Contemporary Hispanic Art, The New Museum of Contemporary Art, and The Studio Museum in Harlem.

In 1997, Simpson received the Artist-in-Residence grant from the Wexner Center for the Arts in Columbus, Ohio, where she exhibited her works in photography. In 2001, she was awarded the Whitney Museum of Art Award, and in 2007, her work was featured in a 20-year retrospective at the Whitney Museum of American Art in her hometown of New York.

Simpson's first European retrospective opened at the Jeu de Paume in Paris in 2013, then traveled to Germany, England, and Massachusetts. She has been one of a handful of African-American artists to exhibit at the Jamaica Arts Center in Queens, New York and then to the gallery in Soho.

External image
- Black America Again (album cover)

She first exhibited paintings in 2015 at the 56th Venice Biennale, followed by a showing at the Salon 94 Bowery.

In 2016 Simpson created the album artwork for Black America Again by Common. During the same year, she was featured in the book In the Company of Women, Inspiration and Advice from over 100 Makers, Artists, and Entrepreneurs. In a 2017 issue of Vogue Magazine, Simpson showcased a series of portraits of 18 professional creative women who hold art central to their lives. The women photographed included Teresita Fernández, Huma Bhabha, and Jacqueline Woodson. Inspired by their resilience, Simpson said of these women, "They don't take no for an answer".

Simpson's work is included in the Afrofuturist Period Room exhibition Before Yesterday We Could Fly at the Metropolitan Museum of Art and in the 2022 exhibition Women Painting Women at the Modern Art Museum of Fort Worth.

While she started her career a conceptual photographer, she has since explored video, installation, drawing, painting and film. Simpson's goal is to continue to influence the legacy of black artists by speaking with artists and activists such as the Art Hoe Collective. When asked about her career Simpson says, "I've always done exactly what I wanted to do, regardless of what was out there. I just stuck to that principle and I'm a much happier person as a result. And I can't imagine trying to satisfy any particular audience".

Her work was included in the 2024 exhibition Making Their Mark: Works from the Shah Garg Collection at the Berkeley Art Museum and Pacific Film Archive (BAMPFA).

In 2025, the Metropolitan Museum exhibited her paintings in "Lorna Simpson: Source Notes."

Simpson's work was included in the 2025 exhibition Photography and the Black Arts Movement, 1955–1985 at the National Gallery of Art.

On April 9, 2026, the Obama Foundation announced that it had commissioned Simpson to create a work for the Obama Presidential Center. Simpson’s work Durative is part of her Ice series “depicting painted icescapes set against an expansive sky.”

== Work ==
Simpson's work often portrays black women combined with text to express contemporary society's relationship with race, ethnicity and sex. In many of her earlier works, the subjects are photographed with obscured faces, causing a denial of gaze and the interaction associated with visual exchange. Simpson's use of "turned-back figures" was used to not only "refuse the gaze" but to also "to deny any presumed access to the sitter's personality, and to refute both the classificatory drives and emotional projections typically satisfied by photographic portraiture of black subjects." It has also been suggested that these figures "stand for a generation's mode of looking and questioning photographic representation" Through repetitive use of the same portrait combined with graphic text, Simpson's "anti-portraits" have a sense of scientific classification, addressing the cultural associations of black bodies. Simpson began working in film in 1997 with Call Waiting (1997). Simpson's "interests in photography [has] always been paralleled by an interest in film, particularly in the way that one structurally builds sequences in film."

Lorna Simpson, Untitled (2 Necklines), 1989, 2 gelatin silver prints and 11 engraved plastic plaques, 40 x 100 in., National Gallery of Art, Washington, DC

Simpson's 1989 work, Necklines, shows two circular and identical photographs of a black woman's mouth, chin, neck, and collar bone. The white text, "ring, surround, lasso, noose, eye, areola, halo, cuffs, collar, loop", individual words on black plaques, imply menace, binding or worse. The final phrase, text on red "feel the ground sliding from under you," openly suggests lynching, though the adjacent images remain serene, non-confrontational and elegant.

Easy for Who to Say, Simpson's work from 1989, displays five identical silhouettes of black women from the shoulders up wearing a white top that is similar to women portrayed in other of Simpson's works. The women's faces are obscured by a white-colored oval shape each with one of the following letters inside: A, E, I, O, U. Underneath the corresponding portraits are the words: Amnesia, Error, Indifference, Omission, Uncivil. In this work Simpson alludes to the racialization in ethnographic cinema and the revocation of history faced by many people of color. Also, the letters covering the faces suggest "intimate multiplicity of positions she might occupy and attitudes she might assume-", these potential thoughts are stopped, abruptly, by the words, "undermining not only the subjective position the figure would seek but also her grasp on any recognizable position at all."

In Simpson's 1989 work Guarded Conditions, she has assembled Polaroid images of a female model. The body is fragmented, viewed from behind, with the back of the model's head in a state of guardedness. Historical and symbolic associations of African-American hairstyles are also brought into play. The message of the text with the formal treatment of the images reinforce a sense of vulnerability. The poses are similar, differing slightly in the placement of feet, hair, and hands. These differences suggest, "the model's shifting relationship to herself." The fragmentation and serialization denies the body’s wholeness and individuality, confronting the viewer with histories of appropriation and consumption of the black female body.Many critics associate the work with the slave auction, as a reminder that black "enslaved women were removed from the circle of human suffering so that they might become circulating objects of sexual and pecuniary exchange." The women become objects, a subject that Simpson often makes the focus of her work.

Simpson incorporated the complicated relationship that African American women have with their natural hair in her work Wigs (1994). The photographs of wigs, lithographed on felt, range from afros, braids and blonde locks of human, yak and synthetic hair mounted side by side. The work does not include any figures, with the arrangement suggesting scientific specimens. Simpson explains in an interview on Wigs (1994) “This work came at a point where I wanted to eliminate the figure from—or eliminate its presence from the work, but I still wanted to talk about that presence.” The Museum of Modern Art describes the work as having social and political undertones about the surrounding culture and the beauty standards that the culture produces. The work forces the viewer to question why such beauty standards exists and how they are perpetuated by society.

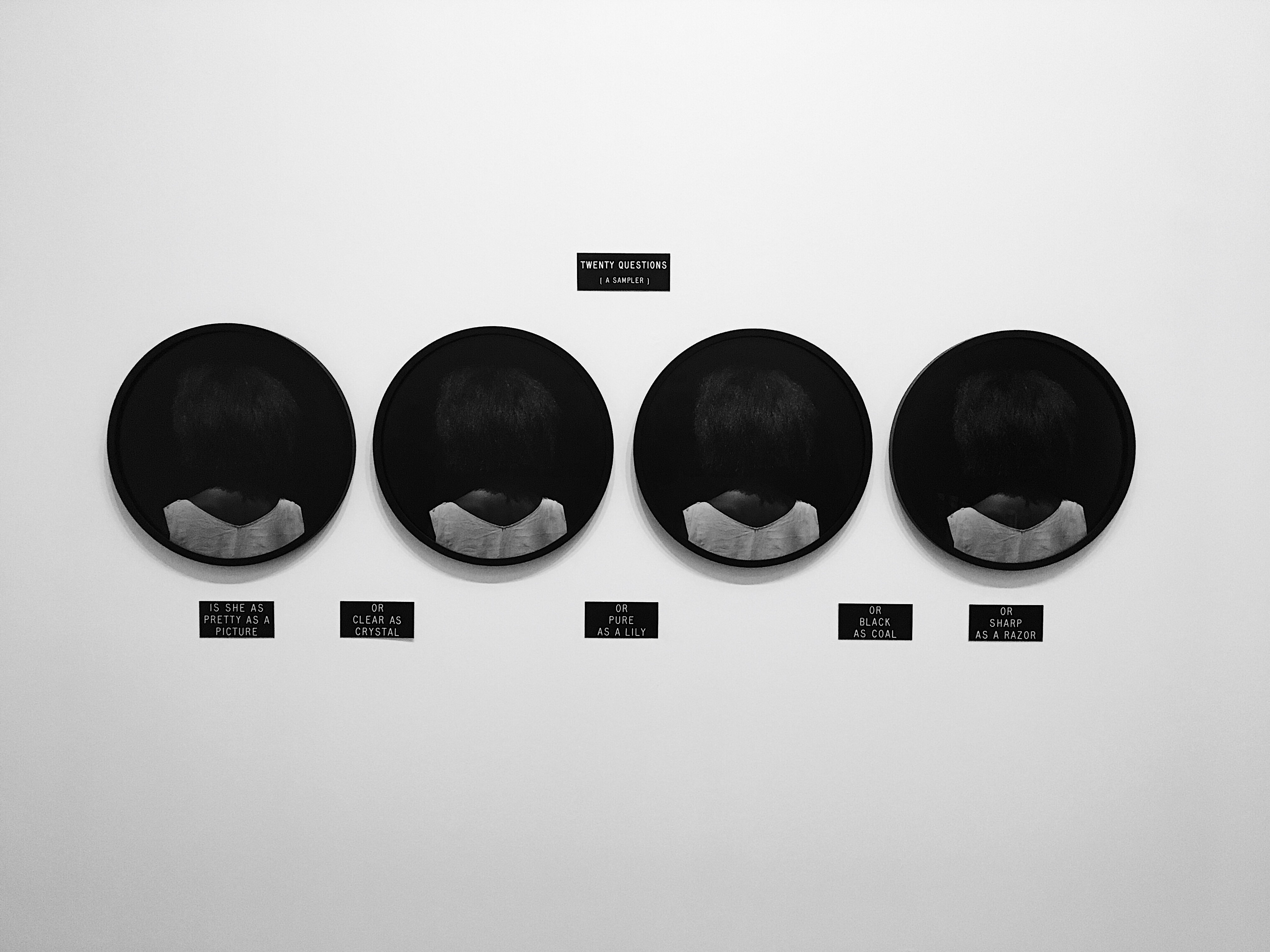
Lorna Simpson, Twenty Questions, (A Sampler), 1986, 4 photographs, gelatin silver prints on paper and 6 engraved plastic plaques.

In a 2003 video installation, Corridor, Simpson sets two women side-by-side; a household servant from 1860 and a wealthy homeowner from 1960. Both women are portrayed by artist Wangechi Mutu, allowing parallel and haunting relationships to be drawn. Music, sometimes lulling and other times sharp and haunting, is used to create "an interesting melding visually of two time periods." Simpson uses "open-ended narratives" in both photography and film because of her interest in "insinuating things". In Corridor, "nothing really happens, it's just a woman going kind of day-to-day, what she does over the course of a day." A "texture" begins to appear, guiding viewers to ask, "what's missing from the picture" and "what [‘s] trying to [be] conveyed." These questions create a setting or "period of time" to imagine a narrative, to figure out "these people's lives during a particular period of time that is important politically." The viewer can digest the political environment and find associations with their own political climate. In addition to considering identity, Corridor considers the past and its effect on the present. Simpson is examining race and class, and attempts "to explore American identity and constructions of race." Simpson commented at the time, "I do not appear in any of my work. I think maybe there are elements to it and moments to it that I use from my own personal experience, but that, in and of itself, is not so important as what the work is trying to say about either the way we interpret experience or the way we interpret things about identity."

In 2009 Simpson introduced self-portraiture into her body of work with the series 1957–2009. Simpson juxtaposed found, pinup-style images of young African American women from 1957 with present day photographs of herself reproducing the model’s pose, clothing and backdrop. Simpson thus recreated a narrative of beauty ideals that excluded black women in the 1950s.

Simpson’s newer works have been series that incorporate found photographs and appropriated imagery from vintage magazines and the Associated Press. The black and white imagery is often layered with type, screen printed on gessoed plexiglass and washed with saturated inks. Natural elements, particularly ice, often appear in these works. Glass blocks representing ice appear in her sculptural work as well. Simpson’s newer work continues to thread figuration, abstraction, metaphor and paradox to challenge race and gender stereotypes.

Artists that have influenced Simpson's work include David Hammons, Adrian Piper, and Felix-Gonzalex Torres; and writers like Ishmael Reed, Langston Hughes, Ntozake Shange, Alice Walker, and Toni Morrison because of their rhythmical voice.

== Personal life ==
From 2007 until 2018, Simpson was married to fellow artist James Casebere. They have a daughter, Zora Casebere, an artist and Instagram personality.

Simpson shared a four-story studio with Casebere at 208 Vanderbilt Avenue in Brooklyn’s Fort Greene neighborhood from 2009 until 2018; the building was David Adjaye's first completed project in the US.

In 2014, Simpson spent a three-week residency at collector Pamela Joyner's Sonoma, California, estate. In 2018, she moved into a new studio at the Brooklyn Navy Yard. The Adjaye building still served as archival and storage space, as well as a spot for hosting and entertaining guests, before it was put on the market in 2025 for $6.5 million.

== Recognition ==
- 1985 – National Endowment for the Arts Fellowship, United States
- 1987 – Workspace Grant, Jamaica Arts Center
- 1989 – Artists Space board of directors, New York, NY
- 1990 – Louis Comfort Tiffany Award, Louis Comfort Tiffany Foundation, New York, NY
- 1994 – Artist Award for a Distinguished Body of Work, College Art Association, New York, NY
- 1997 – Artist-in-Residence Grant, Wexner Center for the Arts, Columbus, OH
- 1998 – Finalist, Hugo Boss Prize 1998, Solomon R. Guggenheim Foundation, New York, NY
- 2001 – Whitney Museum of American Art Award, sponsored by Cartier and the Cartier Foundation for Contemporary Art, New York, NY
- 2003 – Distinguished Artist-In-Residence, Christian A. Johnson Endeavor Foundation, Colgate University, Hamilton, NY
- 2014 – Shortlisted, Deutsche Börse Photography Prize
- 2018 – SMFA Medal Award, School of the Museum of Fine Arts at Tufts Awardee, Boston, MA
- 2019 – Winner, J. Paul Getty Medal (along with Mary Beard and Ed Ruscha)
- 2027: – Wolfgang-Hahn-Preis Köln, a prize awarded by the Society for Modern Art at the Museum Ludwig in Cologne

== List of works ==
- Stereo Styles. 1988. ten instant film pictures placed on engraved plastic. private collection.
- ID. 1990. Pérez Art Museum Miami.
- Back. 1991. 2 colour Polaroids and 3 plastic plaques.
- Counting. 1991. photogravure and screenprint. Minneapolis Institute of Art.
- Five Day Forecast. 1991. 5 photographs, gelatin silver print on paper and 15 engraved plaques. Tate Modern, London.
- Untitled (What should fit here...). 1993. photo-etching, screenprint and hand-applied watercolor. Minneapolis Institute of Art.
- lll (Three Wishbones in a Wood Box). 1994. wooden box containing three wishbones made of ceramic, rubber and bronze inserted in two felt pads. Minneapolis Institute of Art.
- The Waterbearer. 1996. silver print.
- Still. 1997. Pérez Art Museum Miami
- Wigs (Portfolio). 1994. portfolio of twenty-one lithographs on felt with seventeen lithographed felt text panels. Museum of Modern Art, New York City.
- Gestures/Reenactments. 1985. 6 photographs of a black man in white clothes, with text captions underneath.

== Publications ==
- Simon, Joan. "Lorna Simpson." New York: Prestel Publishing, 2013. Print.
- Als, Hilton (2013). Lorna Simpson: Works on Paper. Aspen, CO: Aspen Art Museum Press. ISBN 9780934324632.
- Momin, Shamim; Enwezor, Okwui; Simpson, Lorna; Posner, Helaine; Als, Hilton; Isaac Julien; Golden, Thelma (2006). Lorna Simpson. New York: Abrams, in association with the American Federation of Arts. ISBN 0-8109-5548-2.
- Simpson, Lorna; Willis, Deborah; Grundberg, Andy (1992). Lorna Simpson. San Francisco: The Friends of Photography. ISBN 0-933286-60-0.
- Simpson, Lorna; Wright, Beryl J.; Hartman, Saidiya V. (1992). Lorna Simpson: for the sake of the viewer. New York: Universe Pub. ISBN 0-87663-637-7.
- Rogers-Lafferty, Sarah; Simpson, Lorna (1997). Lorna Simpson: interior/exterior, full/empty. Columbus, Ohio: Wexner Center for the Arts/The Ohio State University. ISBN 1-881390-17-9.
- Gili, Marta (2002). Lorna Simpson. Ediciones Universidad Salamanca. ISBN 84-95719-08-8.
- Jones, Kellie; Simpson, Lorna; Golden, Thelma; Iles, Chrissie; Beckwith, Naomi (2021). Lorna Simpson. London: Phaidon. ISBN 9781838661243..
- Simpson, Lorna; Gili, Marta; Fernández-Cid, Miguel (2004). Compostela: Lorna Simpson: Centro Galego de Arte Contemporánea, 5 marzo - 30 maio 2004, Santiago de Compostela. Santiago de Compostela, Spain: Xunta de Galicia. ISBN 84-453-3752-1.
