= Henry Field =

Henry Field may refer to:

== Politicians ==
- Henry F. Field (1843–1932), Vermont banker and political figure
- Henry Augustus Field (1852–1899), Liberal Party Member of Parliament in New Zealand

== Scholars ==
- Henry Field (apothecary) (1755–1837), English apothecary
- Henry Ibbot Field (1797–1848), English pianist
- Henry Martyn Field (minister) (1822–1907), American minister and writer
- Henry Martyn Field (physician) (1837–1912), American gynecologist
- Henry Field (anthropologist) (1902–1986), American anthropologist
- Henry Edward Field (1903–1991), New Zealand educational psychologist, educationalist and university professor

== Others ==
- Henry Field (athlete) (1878–1944), American Olympic athlete
- Henry Field (1841–1890), businessman
- Mrs. Henry Field (1897–1994), see Nancy Lancaster

== See also ==
- Harry Field (disambiguation)
