= Devin Robinson =

American basketball player (born 1995)

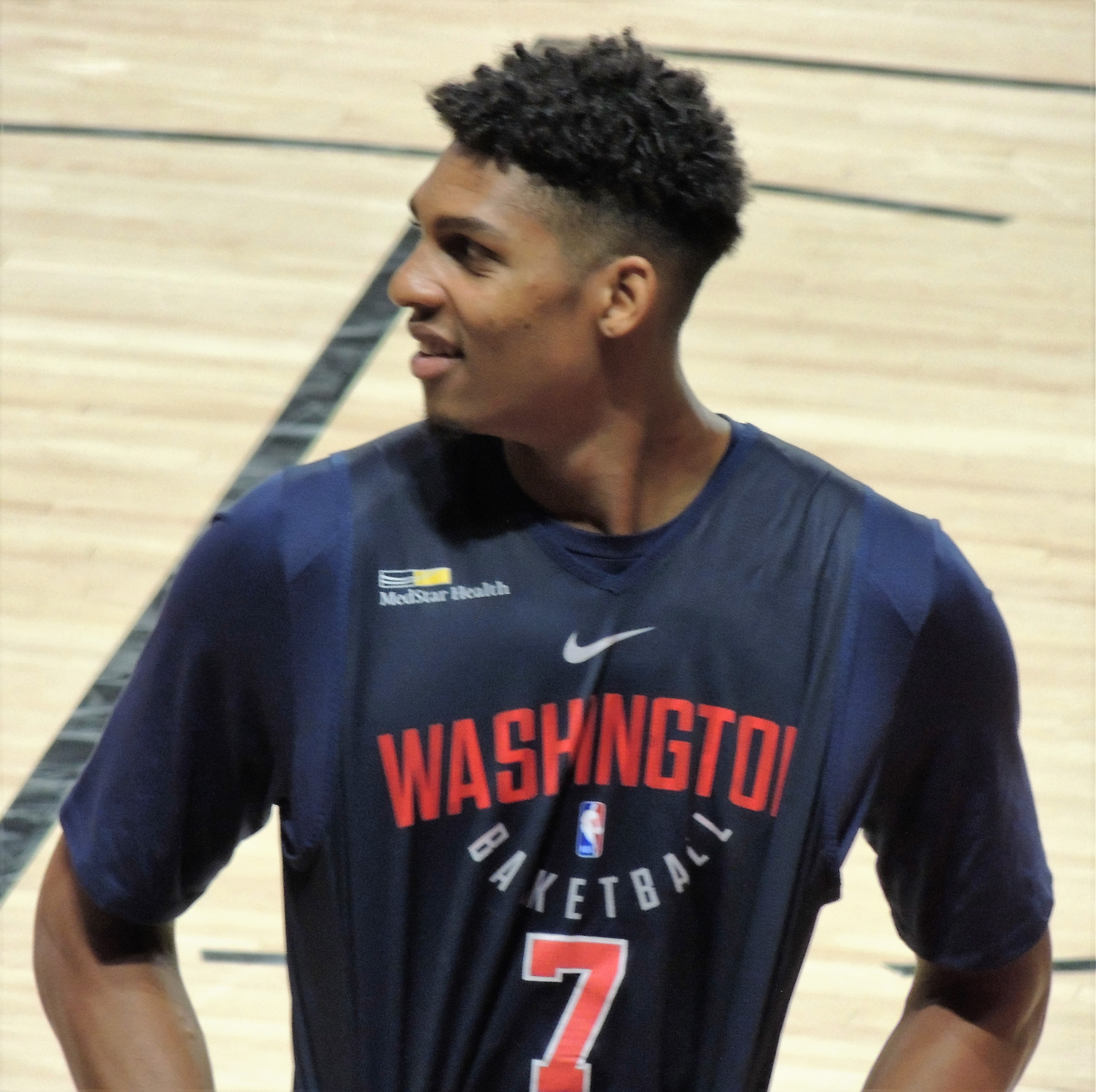
- Robinson with the Washington Wizards in 2017

No. 5 – Śląsk Wrocław
- Position: Power forward / small forward
- League: Polish Basketball League

Personal information
- Born: March 7, 1995 (age 31) Chesterfield, Virginia, U.S.
- Listed height: 6 ft 8 in (2.03 m)
- Listed weight: 200 lb (91 kg)

Career information
- High school: Christchurch (Christchurch, Virginia)
- College: Florida (2014–2017)
- NBA draft: 2017: undrafted
- Playing career: 2017–present

Career history
- 2017–2019: Washington Wizards
- 2017–2018: →Delaware 87ers
- 2018: →Westchester Knicks
- 2018–2019: →Capital City Go-Go
- 2019–2020: Raptors 905
- 2021: Fort Wayne Mad Ants
- 2021–2022: Taoyuan Pilots
- 2022: Piratas de Quebradillas
- 2022: ratiopharm Ulm
- 2022–2024: Manresa
- 2024–2025: Cedevita Olimpija
- 2025–2026: Zaragoza
- 2026–present: Śląsk Wrocław

Career highlights
- All-EuroCup Second Team (2025); Slovenian Cup winner (2025); First-team Parade All-American (2014)
- Stats at NBA.com
- Stats at Basketball Reference

Devin Ray Robinson (born March 7, 1995) is an American professional basketball player for Śląsk Wrocław of the Polish Basketball League (PLK). He played college basketball for the Florida Gators.

== High School and College ==
Robinson earned Virginia Prep League Player of the Year honors after averaging 24 points, ten rebounds, three blocked shots and two assists per game for Christchurch School in 2013–14 en route to a runner-up finish in the VISAA Division II State Championship.

He was recruited by Billy Donovan and chose the University of Florida over Connecticut, Indiana, Notre Dame and Oklahoma State. Despite being disappointed as Donovan left the Gators for the NBA prior to his sophomore year, Robinson stayed at Florida.

"Devin runs like a deer and gets his jump shot off so quickly (…) He’s a very talented guy. He can be a force at both ends of the floor", Florida head coach Michael White described his game in March 2017 according to richmondfreepress.com.

Robinson averaged 11.1 points and 6.1 rebounds a game in the 2016–17 campaign and then decided to forgo his senior year to launch his professional career and enter the 2017 NBA draft.

== Professional career ==
=== Washington Wizards (2017–2019) ===
He went undrafted in the 2017 NBA draft, but joined the Washington Wizards for the 2017 NBA Summer League. Based on this performance, Robinson was signed to a two-way contract by the Wizards on July 14, 2017. He became the team's second two-way contract that year, meaning he also splits time between the Wizards and a G League that best suits Washington's area. On November 2, 2017, Robinson was assigned to the Delaware 87ers of the NBA G League, and later in the season, to the Westchester Knicks.

Playing for the Wizards in the 2018 NBA Summer League, Robinson led the team in scoring with over 19 points per game.

On April 13, 2019, Robinson was arrested and charged with disorderly affray for an altercation with Jalen Mills of the Philadelphia Eagles, outside a DC nightclub. Robinson was taken to the hospital with injuries. Later in the day the Wizards said that they would not be extending Robinson's contract.

Robinson joined the Portland Trail Blazers for the 2019 Las Vegas Summer League.

=== Raptors 905 (2019–2020) ===
On July 23, 2019, the Toronto Raptors announced that they had signed Robinson. They released him on October 19, 2019. He was then added to the roster of their G League affiliate, Raptors 905. Robinson averaged 17.5 points, 7.3 rebounds, 1.9 assists, 1.1 steals, and 1 block per game, shooting 55% from the field.

=== Fort Wayne Mad Ants (2021) ===
On December 18, 2020, Robinson signed with the Indiana Pacers. On December 19, Robinson was waived by the Pacers and was later added to the roster of their G League affiliate, the Fort Wayne Mad Ants.

=== Taoyuan Pilots (2021–2022) ===
On November 10, 2021, Robinson has signed with Taoyuan Pilots of the P. League+.

=== ratiopharm Ulm (2022) ===
On September 20, 2022, Robinson signed with ratiopharm Ulm of the German Basketball Bundesliga. On November 18, he left the team.

=== Bàsquet Manresa (2022–2024) ===
On December 12, 2022, Robinson signed with Baxi Manresa of the Liga ACB. On June 30, 2023, he re-signed with Baxi Manresa for 2023–24 season.

=== Cedevita Olimpija (2024–2025) ===
On July 21, 2024, he signed with Cedevita Olimpija of the Slovenian Basketball League and ABA League.

On March 6, 2025, he was named the Most Valuable Player of the Eightfinals of the Eurocup. He had 21 points and 12 rebounds to lead his team to win.

=== Basket Zaragoza (2025–2026) ===
On August 31, 2025, Robinson signed with Casademont Zaragoza of the Liga ACB.

=== Śląsk Wrocław (2026–present) ===
On August 29, 2026, he signed with Śląsk Wrocław of the Polish Basketball League (PLK).

== Career statistics ==
Legend
GP	Games played	GS	Games started	MPG	Minutes per game
FG%	Field goal percentage	3P%	3-point field goal percentage	FT%	Free throw percentage
RPG	Rebounds per game	APG	Assists per game	SPG	Steals per game
BPG	Blocks per game	PPG	Points per game	**Bold**	Career high

=== NBA ===
==== Regular season ====
Year	Team	GP	GS	MPG	FG%	3P%	FT%	RPG	APG	SPG	BPG	PPG
2017–18	Washington	1	0	13.0	.333	–	–	**5.0**	.0	**1.0**	.0	2.0
2018–19	Washington	**7**	0	**13.6**	**.594**	.000	**.643**	2.9	**.9**	.6	**.9**	**6.7**
Career		8	0	13.5	.571	.000	.643	3.1	.8	.6	.8	6.1

=== College ===
Year	Team	GP	GS	MPG	FG%	3P%	FT%	RPG	APG	SPG	BPG	PPG
2014–15	Florida	33	18	19.0	.402	.256	.636	2.8	**.7**	.5	.4	6.4
2015–16	Florida	**36**	18	23.1	.458	.340	**.756**	5.6	.5	.5	.6	9.0
2016–17	Florida	**36**	**35**	**26.4**	**.475**	**.391**	.723	**6.1**	.6	**.9**	**.8**	**11.1**
Career		105	71	23.0	.450	.336	.714	4.9	.6	.6	.6	8.9
