= Harry Field =

Harry Field may refer to:

- Harry Field (rugby league) (before 1910–after 1972), English prop or hooker during 1920s and 1930s
- Harry Field (American football) (1911–1964), American offensive tackle during 1930s

== See also ==
- Harry & David Field, American baseball park in Medford, Oregon
- Henry Field (disambiguation)
