= Stereo Styles =

Stereo Styles

Stereo Styles by Lorna Simpson consists of ten instant film pictures placed on engraved plastic. This piece was created in 1988 and is currently located in a private collection. The ten individual images focus exclusively on the back of a young black woman's head. Each image, all shot in black and white, shows the young woman modeling different hairstyles that would have been popular in the era. Accompanying these ten photos is ten descriptive words placed on a thin black strip, written in white cursive that read: ‘Daring,’ ‘Sensible,’ ‘Severe,’ ‘Long and Silky,’ ‘Boyish,’ ‘Ageless,’ ‘Silly, ‘Magnetic,’ ‘Country Fresh,’ and ‘Sweet.’ Simpson has added more depth and emotion to this piece by creating a drop shadow under each photograph.

== Artist background ==
Lorna Simpson is a feminist photographer from Brooklyn, New York, whose subject matter solely focuses on young African American women. Simpson's works convey political messages that touch on the controversial subject of racism and sexism in modern America. She is noted for her tendency not to put a face to her subject, eliminating the documentary genre that her work is otherwise described as. To take it one step further, she adds either empowering or degrading words to complement the photos. This technique is called an anti-portrait, an artwork that simultaneously engages with and resists traditional portraiture. Her practices are meant to convey powerful messages, to “allude to grapple with portraits of the past [and] to reimagine black women’s places in the visual dimensions of the American symbolic order.”

== Advertisement and personality ==
Simpson successfully creates a powerful piece out of Stereo Styles from the seriousness of the black and white to the undertone of sarcasm in the descriptive words written in the center. Through her layout and representation of the young woman in the ten photos, the principles of cosmetic advertising of the 1980s can be used as a reference of influence. Similar to lipstick layouts, the names of the specific lipstick colors are written under each tube. Using the advertisement format, her piece transforms simple hairstyles into individual personalities through photography and descriptive words. However, where advertisements' product names are specific to one subject, Simpson's work does not provide a specific photo to a matching word. In this way, the viewer can form their own opinion of which hairstyle best expresses the adjective.

== Chronology of physical treatment ==
It is also thought that the ten different hairstyles represent a chronology correlating to changes in physical condition and treatment. This layout is important to note, particularly because black women were not being used in advertisements, especially for the hairstyles or personality traits that made them unique. Similarly, the public was not avidly following the African American movement, making the transformation of hairstyles a message to society that things are beginning to change. Through the transformative hairstyles and playful descriptors, a suggestion of black women's efforts to make it in the professional work world shines through. This piece is meant to empower young black women to succeed in modern America, but also emphasizes the presence of racial controversies that need to be made aware of.
