= Charles E. Haldeman =

American businessman

- Born: October 29, 1948 (age 77); Philadelphia
- Education: Dartmouth College, summa cum laude in economics Harvard Law School, JD and MBA
- Occupation: Former CEO of Freddie Mac
- Spouse: Barbara Chow Haldeman
- Children: 3

Charles Edgar Haldeman, Jr. (born October 29, 1948) was the chief executive officer of the Federal Home Loan Mortgage Corporation, known as Freddie Mac, a publicly traded company that is the second largest source of mortgage financing in the United States. On October 26, 2011, it was announced that Haldeman would retire, but he agreed to stay until a successor was found. Haldeman left Freddie Mac in May 2012. He is the former President, CEO, and chairman of the board of directors, of Putnam Investments, a mutual fund company based in Boston, Massachusetts. He served on the Board of Trustees of Dartmouth College from 2004 to 2012.

== Biography ==
He was born to Betty Jane and Charles Edgar Haldeman, Sr. on October 29, 1948, in Philadelphia, Pennsylvania. He graduated summa cum laude from Dartmouth College in economics in 1970. In 1974, he received both a J.D. degree cum laude from Harvard Law School and an M.B.A. degree with high distinction from Harvard Business School, where he was a Baker Scholar. He is also a CFA charter holder. In 2004, he was elected to serve as a charter trustee on the board of trustees at Dartmouth.

Haldeman was a managing partner and director at the investment firm Cooke and Bieler Inc. from 1974 to 1998, President and COO of United Asset Management Corporation from 1998 to 2000, and CEO of Delaware Investments from 2000 to 2002. He then joined Putnam Investments as co-lead of the investment division. In the wake of the Mutual fund scandal of 2003, he was appointed President and CEO of Putnam and has since led the company forward in reorganization, compliance, and enhanced disclosure. Having stabilized the business, Haldeman led an initiative to sell the company. In January 2007, Putnam Investments was sold to Great-West Lifeco for 3.9 billion dollars.

In 2009 Haldeman joined Freddie Mac as its chief executive. In July 2012 he was appointed to the McGraw-Hill's board of directors.

Haldeman is recognized in the industry for his high ethical standards. In December 2006, CFA Magazine cited him as "The Most Influential Person in the Industry" for 2006. He and his wife Barbara, both Harvard Law alumni, have donated millions of dollars to Dartmouth College. In 2004, a $10 million gift was made to open the Haldeman Center, home to the John Sloan Dickey Center for International Understanding, the Fannie and Alan Leslie Center for the Humanities, and the Ethics Institute. Haldeman serves on numerous other boards and committees, including the Boston Chamber of Commerce and the ICI board of governors, and was previously an "overseer" for the Tuck School of Business. In August 2007, Sigma Phi Epsilon awarded Haldeman its Citation award. The Sigma Phi Epsilon Citation is presented to a small, highly select group of alumni who have achieved uncommon success and stature in their particular professions and fields of endeavor, and, by doing so, have brought great honor to themselves and to the Fraternity. From 1965 to August 2007, 241 SigEp members had been honored with the Citation. Haldeman was a member of SigEp's New Hampshire Alpha Chapter at Dartmouth College and served as the chapter's president from 1969 to 1970.

Haldeman and his wife currently live in Haverford, Pennsylvania. They have three children.

== See also ==
- Putnam Investments
