= Sally Pinkas =

- סאלי פנקס
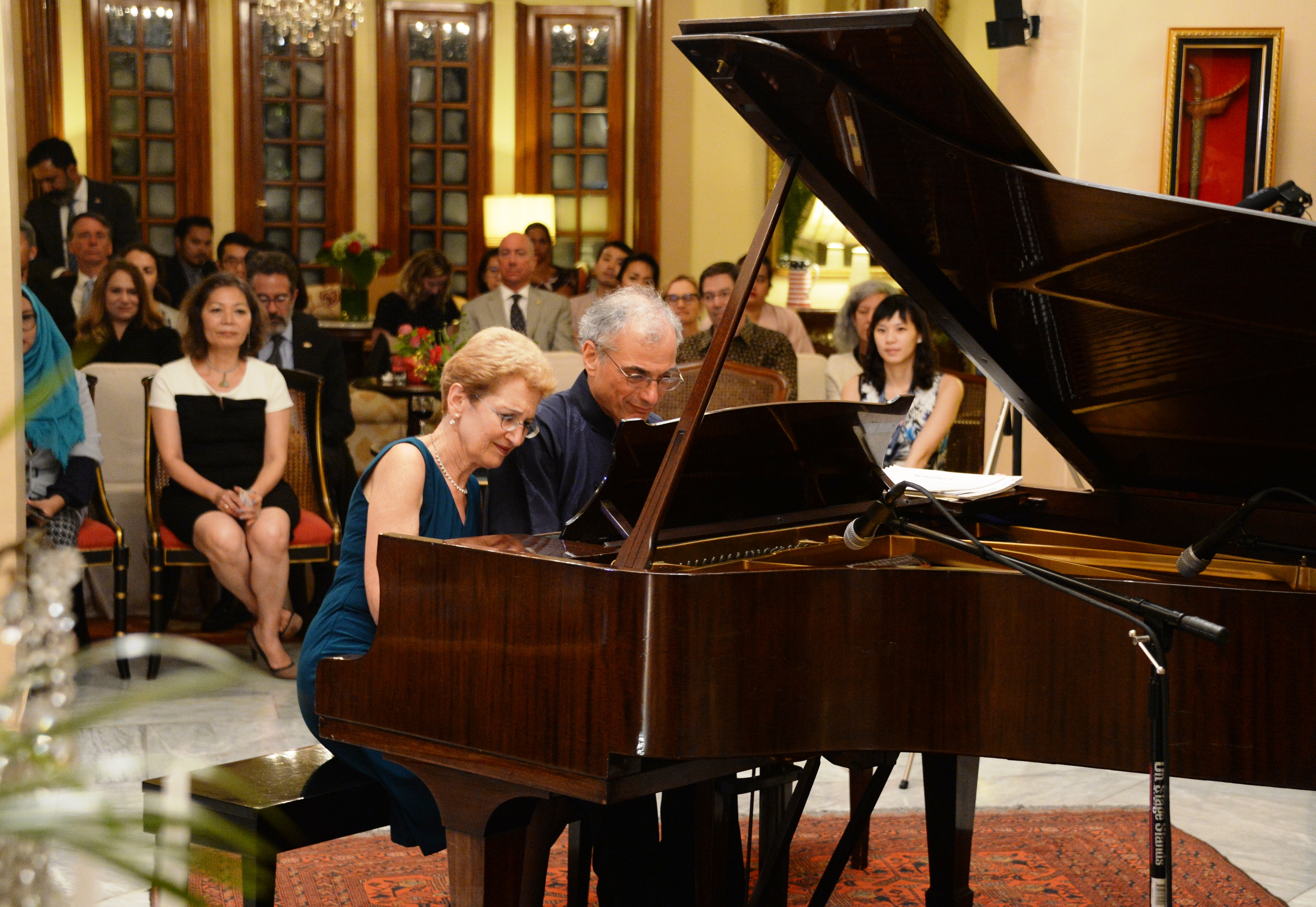
- Born: Tel Aviv, Israel
- Education: Brandeis University (BA); Indiana University School of Music (MM); New England Conservatory of Music; Brandeis University (PhD)
- Occupation(s): Pianist, Professor of Music, Dartmouth College; Pianist-in-residence, Hopkins Center for the Arts
- Spouse: Evan Hirsch

Sally Pinkas (Hebrew: סאלי פנקס) is a pianist, born and raised in Israel. She is Professor of Music at Dartmouth College in Hanover, New Hampshire, and pianist-in-residence of the Hopkins Center for the Arts at Dartmouth.

== Early life and education ==
Pinkas moved to the United States as a teenager to study piano. She studied at Indiana University School of Music and the New England Conservatory of Music, and earned her Ph.D. in Composition and Theory from Brandeis University. She made her debut in London in 1983.

== Career ==
Her principal teachers were Russell Sherman, George Sebok, Luise Vosgerchian, Genia Bar-Niv and Rami Bar-Niv (piano), Sergiu Natra (composition), and Robert Koff (chamber music).

She explores contemporary music as well as the traditional repertoire, including chamber music. She performs with her husband Evan Hirsch as the Hirsch-Pinkas Piano Duo. Pinkas has released a number of solo and duo recordings. Her recording of Fauré's Thirteen Nocturnes was named one of the 2002's best CDs by The Boston Globe. American composers Daniel Pinkham and George Rochberg wrote duo piano works for the Hirsch-Pinkas Duo.

The Wall Street Journal noted her “exquisite performance” in her “superlatively well-played” recording of Harold Shapero’s Piano Music, released on the UK label Toccata Classics.
