= Magdalena Bezanilla =

American biologist

Magdalena Bezanilla is a biologist and the Ernest Evert Just 1907 Professor at Dartmouth College. Bezanilla is known for her research into molecular mechanisms that affect cell shape.

== Early life and education ==
Magdalena's father, biophysicist Dr. Francisco Bezanilla, conducted studies in his lab located in Cape Cod, Massachusetts. His research was over the largest nerve cell in the animal kingdom which is located on squids. This is where her interest in laboratory work was found. Magdalena was an undergraduate at the University of California, Santa Barbara, majoring in physics. She received her doctoral degree in biochemistry and cellular and molecular biology from Johns Hopkins University.

== Career and research ==
Bezanilla was an associate professor of biology at University Of Massachusetts, Amherst. Bezanilla runs her own laboratory at Dartmouth College that focuses on how plant cells grow. Magdalena and her colleagues developed a technique called multi-gene silencing to simultaneously silence genes in a multicellular organism. Their goal is to understand the molecular mechanisms that control cell growth using both directed and undirected approaches. She joined Dartmouth University as the Ernest Evert Just 1907 Professor in 2017.

Her work focuses on the configuration of plant cell walls and supporting structures that govern a cell’s shape, internal organization, and patterns of growth and development. She has also pioneered the use of a moss called Physcomitrella as a model system in her research. Bezanilla developed the use of moss physcomitrella patens as a model system to figure out proteins in the plant cell regulate growth and morphogenesis.

== Awards and recognition ==
In 2023, Bezanilla was named a fellow of the American Society of Plant Biologists, and in 2026, she was named an Honorary Fellow of the American Association for the Advancement of Science. This nation wide organization is for purely scientists and engineers; Benzanilla had the honor of being one amongst 449 for that year.( "Biology Professor Magdanela Benzanilla elected as American Association for the Advancement of Science fellow". The Darmouth.)Bezanilla was the first woman to win the Golden Spore Award in 2022 from the International Molecular Moss Science Society. She also received the CAREER award from the National Science Foundation. In 2010, she was awarded the Presidential Early Career Award for Scientists and Engineers. Bezanilla was awarded the Packard Fellowship for Science and Engineering in 2007 for her research into molecular mechanisms that affect cell shape.
