= Peter Travis (Canadian football) =

Canadian football player (born 1945)

Profile
- Position: Offensive tackle

Personal information
- Born: November 11, 1945 (age 80)
- Listed height: 6 ft 4 in (1.93 m)
- Listed weight: 250 lb (113 kg)

Career information
- College: Louisville

Career history
- 1968: BC Lions
- 1970–1973: Edmonton Eskimos

Peter Travis (born November 11, 1945) is a retired Canadian football player who played for the Edmonton Eskimos and BC Lions. He played college football at the University of Louisville.
