= Keith Paulsen =

Keith Paulsen from the Thayer School of Engineering at Dartmouth College was named Fellow of the Institute of Electrical and Electronics Engineers (IEEE) in 2016 for leadership in biomedical technologies in medical imaging for diagnosis and intervention.
