= Marnie Halpern =

American biochemist

- Born: December 25, 1956; Hamilton, Ontario, Canada
- Education: McMaster University, Yale University
- Awards: Pew Scholar in the Biomedical Sciences
- Scientific career
- Workplaces: University of Oregon, Carnegie Institution for Science, Dartmouth College

Marnie Halpern (born December 25, 1956) is the Andrew J. Thomson Professor and Chair of molecular and systems biology at the Geisel School of Medicine at Dartmouth College. She is a Pew Scholar in the Biomedical Sciences. and a Fellow of the American Association for the Advancement of Science.

Halpern's research has focused on studying how differences are established between the right and left sides of the developing brain. Her laboratory has performed screenings in order to identify the genes that control the asymmetry of the brain. The lab has also developed methods to perturb the laterality of larval and adult fish and developed methods to visualize the brains of altered and normal individuals.

== Early life and education ==
Marnie E. Halpern grew up in Hamilton, Ontario, Canada. Her family was of Jewish descent and left Europe after the Second World War. Her father was a doctor. His practice was located in their house and Halpern helped him from an early age.

Halpern studied at McMaster University and worked as a research assistant at McMaster University Medical Center. She obtained her bachelor's degree in biology in 1981. Working with James R Smiley, she focused on herpes simplex gene regulation. She earned her master's degree in molecular biology in 1984.

She went on to Yale University, where she received her PhD in biology in 1990. At Yale, she studied Drosophila melanogaster (fruit fly) neuromuscular development with Spyros Artavanis-Tsakonas, and characterized the neorumuscular system in larvae with Haig Keshishian.

== Further career ==
After meeting Charles Kimmel at a neuroscience conference, her interest in zebrafish (Danio rerio) expanded. She joined Kimmel's laboratory at the University of Oregon, and did postdoctoral research on no tail mutants from 1990 to 1994. She subsequently moved to the laboratory of Christiane Nusslein-Volhard in Germany.

In 1994, Halpern joined the Department of Embryology of the Carnegie Institution for Science in Baltimore, Maryland. She was also recruited by Donald D. Brown to become an Adjunct Assistant Professor in the Department of Biology at Johns Hopkins University.

In 2019, Halpern became Chair of the Department of Molecular and Systems Biology at the Geisel School of Medicine at Dartmouth College. In 2021, she was named the Andrew Thomson, Jr., MD 1946 Professor at Dartmouth College.

In 2024, Halpern signed a faculty letter supporting Dartmouth College president Sian Beilock, who ordered the arrests of 90 students and faculty members nonviolently protesting the Gaza war.
