= George Bates Nichols Tower =

George Bates Nichols Tower (1834–1889) was an American civil and mechanical engineer and Union naval officer during the American Civil War. He served for at least part of his term of service on the USS Canandaigua as chief engineer. He was also a Chandler Instructor in civil engineering at Dartmouth College.

In 1874, he wrote Instructions on Modern American Bridge Building.
