= Rahul Sarpeshkar =

- Scientific career
- Fields: bioengineering, physics, electrical engineering, computational science
- Workplaces: Dartmouth College, Vail Building

Rahul Sarpeshkar is the Thomas E. Kurtz Professor and a professor of engineering, professor of physics, professor of microbiology & immunology, and professor of molecular and systems biology at Dartmouth College. Sarpeshkar, whose interdisciplinary work is in bioengineering, electrical engineering, quantum physics, and biophysics, is the inaugural chair of the William H. Neukom cluster of computational science, which focuses on analog, quantum, and biological computation. The clusters, designed by faculty from across the institution to address major global challenges, are part of President Philip Hanlon's vision for strengthening academic excellence at Dartmouth. Prior to Dartmouth, Sarpeshkar was a tenured professor at the Massachusetts Institute of Technology and led the Analog Circuits and Biological Systems Group. He is now also a visiting scientist at MIT's Research Laboratory of Electronics.

== Research fields ==
His research has contributed to the fields of:

- Analog circuits and analog computation
- Molecular, systems, and synthetic biology
- Ultra-low-power and ultra-energy-efficient systems
- Energy-harvesting design
- Glucose-powered medical implants
- Bioelectronics
- Bio-inspired and biomimetic systems
- Cytomorphic (cell-inspired) systems
- Analog supercomputing systems
- Quantum and quantum-inspired analog computers
- Medical devices
- Cochlear implants
- Brain-machine interfaces
- Control theory

== Research summary ==
Sarpeshkar's recent TEDx talk 'Analog Supercomputers: From Quantum Atom to Living Body' summarizes some of his interdisciplinary research . His research uses analog circuits and analog computation to architect innovations in bioengineering and synthetic biology, biological supercomputing, ultra energy efficient computing, and quantum computing. For example, by mapping log-domain analog electronic circuits to log-domain analog DNA-protein circuits in living cells , Professor Sarpeshkar's work in the May 2013 edition of Nature (doi: 10.1038/nature12148) pioneered the field of analog synthetic biology . Three awarded patents and one pending patent of his have shown how to emulate quantum physics with classical analog circuits rigorously. He has used it to create quantum-inspired architectures that do spectrum analysis like the biological inner ear or cochlea, i.e., a 'Quantum Cochlea'. Professor Sarpeshkar's book introduced a novel form of electronics termed Cytomorphic electronics, i.e., electronics inspired by cell biology . It is based on the astounding similarity between the Boltzmann exponential equations of noisy molecular flux in chemical reactions and the Boltzmann exponential equations of noisy electron flow in transistors. Hence circuits in biology and chemistry can be mapped to circuits in electronics and vice versa. Therefore, this 'cytomorphic mapping' enables one to map analog electronic motifs to analog molecular circuit motifs in living cells as in the work in Nature and also to simulate large-scale feedback networks in cells with analog electronic supercomputers. Thus, his work has led to a novel and fundamental analog circuits approach to the fields of synthetic biology and systems biology, both of which are important in the future of biotechnology and medicine . For example, the synthesis of biofuels, chemicals, energy, molecular and cellular sensors, network drug design, treatments for cancer, diabetes, auto-immune, infectious, and neural diseases can be impacted by his work on analog synthetic and systems biology.

Sarpeshkar's work on glucose powered medical implants has been featured in the Economist, WIRED, and Science News and was highlighted by Scientific American among 2012's top scientific breakthroughs . Professor Sarpeshkar's work on a hybrid analog-digital circuit that mimics feedback networks in the brain has appeared on the cover of the journal Nature and has received wide media attention . His work on an ultra-low-power analog cochlear-implant processor for the deaf has had wide impact and been featured in articles in the New York Times , Technology Review, and IEEE Spectrum, as has his work on ultra-low-power brain-machine interfaces for the blind and paralyzed and for cardiac and non-invasive monitoring. His group holds several first and best world records in the fields of medical devices, medical electronics, ultra low power, analog, and bio-inspired design .

He has authored more than 139 technical publications and is an inventor on more than forty two awarded patents. He is the inventor of the RF Cochlea, a rapid radio-frequency spectrum analyzer inspired by the human ear . His book Ultra Low Power Bioelectronics: Fundamentals, Biomedical Applications, and Bio-inspired Systems is published by Cambridge University Press and provides a broad and deep treatment of the fields of analog, ultra low power, biomedical, biological, energy-harvesting and bio-inspired design. It is based on a course that Sarpeshkar has taught at MIT for many years, which emphasizes how the universal language of analog circuits provides a pictorial and intuitive method for analyzing differential equations in physics, chemistry, biology, engineering, and medicine. He has won the Junior Bose award and the Ruth and Joel Spira award for excellence in teaching at MIT.

Sarpeshkar has received several awards including the NSF Career Award, the ONR Young Investigator Award, the Packard Fellows Award, and the Indus Technovator Award. He is a Fellow of the IEEE and a Fellow of the National Academy of Inventors. He is an Associate Editor of the IEEE Transactions on Biomedical Circuits and Systems and serves on the program committees of several technical conferences. His recent TEDx talk 'Analog Supercomputers: From Quantum Atom to Living Body' summarizes some of his unique and interdisciplinary research . His invited Google Tech talk at the 2011 Frontiers of Engineering Conference, hosted by the National Academy of Engineering (NAE) summarizes his earlier work on an ultra low power programmable analog cochlear implant processor and other ultra-low-power implantable devices .

== Education ==
Sarpeshkar received B.S. degrees in electrical engineering and physics from the Massachusetts Institute of Technology and the Ph.D. degree in computation and neural systems from the California Institute of Technology. His adviser at Caltech was Carver A. Mead. He was a member of technical staff at Bell Labs in its Department of Biological Computation within its Physics Division.
