= Odette Harris =

American neurosurgeon

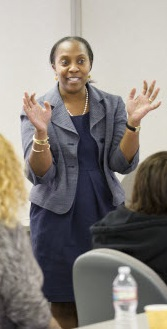
- Harris in 2014
- Born: September 30, 1969 (age 56), Jamaica
- Education: Dartmouth College; Stanford University School of Medicine
- Occupation: Neurosurgeon
- Employer: Stanford University School of Medicine
- Spouse: Edward Sharp (m. 1997)
- Children: 2

Odette Harris (born September 30, 1969) is a professor of neurosurgery at Stanford University and the Director of the Brain Injury Program for the Stanford University School of Medicine. She is the Deputy Chief of Staff, Rehabilitation at the VA Palo Alto Health Care System.

== Education ==
Harris attended Mary Help of Christians Academy for high school. Harris graduated from Dartmouth College and received her MD from Stanford University School of Medicine. She received numerous academic and research awards at both institutions. Harris completed her internship and residency at Stanford University Medical Center. She was the only Black woman in her class at medical school, and the only woman during her residency. She completed a masters of public health in epidemiology at University of California, Berkeley, and a fellowship at the University of the West Indies. In 2007, she joined Louisiana State University working on peripheral neuropathy.

== Career ==
Harris' speciality is traumatic brain injury. She is a professor of neurosurgery at Stanford University School of Medicine, Vice Chair of Diversity for the Department of Neurosurgery, and Director of Brain Injury for Stanford Medical Center. Harris manages and coordinates the medical and surgical care of all patients with traumatic brain injury that are admitted to the Stanford System. She focuses on implementing and streamlining current treatment algorithms aimed at improving the outcomes of this growing population. The primary focus is specific not only to mortality, but to functional outcome improvements. Harris works in a collaborative manner with colleagues in Surgical Trauma, Neuro-Critical Care, Nursing, Rehabilitation and all related Specialties. She is the Deputy Chief of Staff, Rehabilitation at the Veterans Affairs Palo Alto Health Care System, which includes responsibilities for the varied programs of the Polytrauma System of Care, Spinal Cord Injury, Blind Rehabilitation Services, Recreational Therapy and Physical Medicine and Rehabilitation. The programs hold regional and national oversight, as part of a national infrastructure.

Harris has authored several scientific articles and books, is a member of several Editorial Boards and National Committees including as the Associate Editor for Neurosurgery and as an appointed Member, National Football League (NFL) Head, Neck and Spine Committee. She also serves on several Boards including the Palo Alto Veterans Institute for Research (PAVIR) and Defense Health Board's (DHB) Trauma and Injury Subcommittee. Harris is a Trustee for the Boys and Girls Club of the Peninsula, the Castilleja School and Dartmouth College. She is a Fellow of the American Association of Neurological Surgeons and a member of the Congress of Neurological Surgeons. Harris was appointed a Fellow of the Aspen Global Leadership Network in 2018. She is a mentor with the National Mentoring Network.

In 2017, she published Handbook of Neurosurgery, Neurology, and Spinal Medicine for Nurses and Advanced Practice Health Professionals. In 2018, she was the first African American woman to be appointed Professor of Neurosurgery at Stanford University.

She spoke at the PINK Concussions conference in 2016. She is a board member of the Boys & Girls Clubs of America and spoke at their Women's Leadership event in 2017.

Harris was invited to speak at the 2026 Geisel School of Medicine MD Investiture Ceremony and has been recognized for her spectacular sense of humor.

== Awards and honours ==
She has won numerous academic, research and humanitarian awards including the Congress of Neurological Surgeons Clinical Fellowship Award, the American Association of Neurological Surgeons Spinal Cord/Spinal Column Injury Award and the Western Neurosurgical Society Resident Award. Her research efforts have also been recognized by the government of Jamaica, where she was awarded the National Road Safety Council Award for outstanding contribution in traumatic brain injury. She was recognized in 2019 by Forbes and Ebony Magazine Power 100 List Award as one of 100 most influential African Americans and received the National Medical Fellowships (NMF) Award for Excellence in Academic Medicine.

- 2001 – The Western Neurosurgical Society – Research Award
- 2003 – American Association of Neurological Surgeons – William P. Van Wagenen Fellowship
- 2004 – National Road Safety Council Award, Awarded by Prime Minister and Minister of Health, Jamaica
- 2009 – Woodruff Leadership Academy Fellow, Emory University
- 2010 – Stanford Leadership Development Program, Stanford University School of Medicine
- 2011 – Scientific Award, Caribbean Association Neuroscience Symposium/University Hospital of the West Indies
- 2012 – Advanced Stanford Leadership Development Program, Stanford University School of Medicine
- 2012 – President of Women in Neurosurgery
- 2012 – Stanford Faculty Research Fellow at the Clayman Institute for Gender Research
- 2013 – STARS Volunteer Leadership Assembly Honoree, Stanford Alumni Association
- 2019 – Forbes and Ebony Magazine Power 100 List Award as one of 100 most influential African Americans
