= Claudia V. Jakubzick =

American immunologist

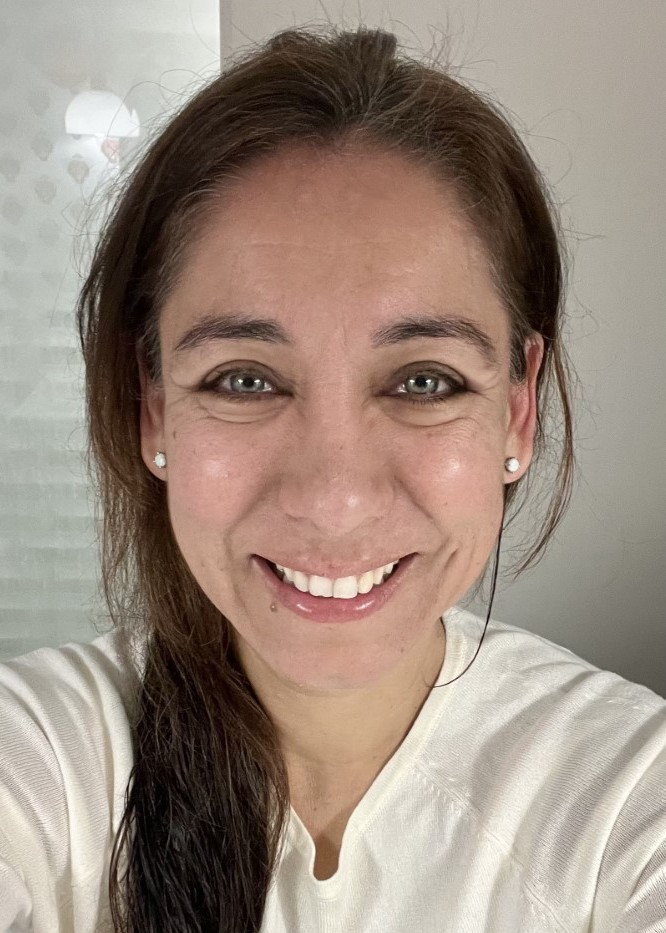
- Born: South Miami, Florida, U.S.
- Education: University of Florida (B.S.); University of Michigan (Ph.D.)
- Known for: Macrophage heterogeneity Mononuclear phagocyte specialization Natural antibodies and cancer immunosurveillance
- Awards: Zucker Award for Women in Science; Dartmouth Research Excellence Award for Senior Faculty in Foundational Science
- Scientific career
- Fields: Immunology
- Workplaces: Geisel School of Medicine at Dartmouth

Claudia V. Jakubzick is an American immunologist and Professor in the Department of Microbiology and Immunology at the Geisel School of Medicine at Dartmouth College. She is recognized for her research on the functional specialization of mononuclear phagocytes and their roles in inflammation, cancer immunosurveillance, and immune homeostasis, in addition to her work understanding the role of natural antibodies in cancer elimination during its early stages.

== Early life and education ==
Jakubzick was born and raised in South Miami, Florida. She began her academic journey at Miami Dade College before transferring to the University of Florida, where she earned a B.S. in Microbiology in 1998. She completed a Ph.D. in Immunology at the University of Michigan in 2003 under the mentorship of Drs. Steven Kunkel and Cory Hogaboam. From 2004 to 2009, she conducted postdoctoral research at the Mount Sinai School of Medicine in the laboratory of Gwendalyn J. Randolph.

== Career ==
Jakubzick began her faculty career as an Instructor at the Mount Sinai School of Medicine and later held faculty positions at National Jewish Health and the University of Colorado. In 2019, she joined the Geisel School of Medicine at Dartmouth as an associate professor and became a full professor in 2024. She has served on the American Association of Immunologists' Minority Affairs Committee and was an organizer for the 2022 Keystone Conference Myeloid Cells: Functions in Infections, Cancer and Beyond.

== Research ==
Jakubzick’s laboratory investigates the mononuclear phagocyte (MP) system—including macrophages, monocytes, and dendritic cells—with a focus on tissue-resident subsets and their roles in immunity and disease. Her team has been instrumental in characterizing alveolar and interstitial macrophage heterogeneity in the lung, identifying ten functionally distinct subsets in both mice and humans using single-cell RNA sequencing and spatial transcriptomics.

Her research explores cross-species homology among mononuclear phagocyte subtypes to improve the translational relevance of mouse models to human immunology, with implications for vaccine design, cancer immunotherapy, and autoimmune disease treatment. Notably, her studies on natural antibodies have revealed a previously unrecognized role for B cells and IgM in the early detection and clearance of neoantigen-expressing cells, offering new insights into the mechanisms of cancer immunosurveillance.

Jakubzick was also a member of the Immunological Genome Project Consortium, contributing to large-scale efforts to define immune cell transcriptional profiles across tissues and species.

== Selected publications ==
- Gibbings SL, et al. Three unique interstitial macrophages in the murine lung at steady state. Am J Respir Cell Mol Biol. 2017.
- Atif SM, et al. Immune surveillance by natural IgM is required for early neoantigen recognition and initiation of adaptive immunity. Am J Respir Cell Mol Biol. 2018.
- Jakubzick C, et al. Biology of lung macrophages in health and disease. Immunity. 2022.
- Rawat K, et al. CCL5-producing migratory dendritic cells guide CCR5⁺ monocytes into the draining lymph nodes. J Exp Med. 2023.
- Li X, et al. Coordinated chemokine expression defines macrophage subsets across tissues. Nat Immunol. 2024.
