= Mary Albert =

American earth scientist

Mary Remley Albert
- Born: 1952 (age 73–74)
- Education: Pennsylvania State University; Dartmouth College
- Scientific career
- Workplaces: Dartmouth College; CRREL
- Thesis: Wavy ice growth in forced flow (1991)

Mary Remley Albert (born 1952) is an American earth scientist who is a Professor of Engineering at Dartmouth College. She studies snow physics and transport phenomena. She is executive director of the US Ice Drilling Program.

== Early life and education ==
Albert was an undergraduate student at Pennsylvania State University. She first studied mathematics, before moving to Dartmouth College for graduate studies. Her master's work developed two-dimensional models to understand freezing using a moving mesh finite element approach. After earning her master's degree in engineering sciences, she moved to the University of California, San Diego. Her doctoral research considered the growth of wavy ice in forced flow. She joined the U.S. Army Corps of Engineers Cold Regions Research and Engineering Lab (CRREL), where she developed computational models to understand two-dimensional heat conduction.

== Research and career ==
At Dartmouth, Albert is a member of the Ice Research Laboratory. The laboratory looks to advance understanding of ice-related phenomena and train the next generation of polar researchers. She makes use of polar ice cores to better understand the climate catastrophe as well as developing adaptation strategies for communities to survive as the world's climate changes. Albert has been involved with scientific expeditions to Greenland and Antarctica. On these missions, she uses shallow radar, GPS and satellite imagery to understand the processes that go on in polar regions. In particular, Albert has studied ancient snow known as firn, which provides insight into 800,000 years of climate. She extracts firn from ice sheets, examines the firn's microstructure and monitors how it traps atmospheric gases. Albert worked with people from Qaanaaq to build renewable energy infrastructure that serves the northernmost communities of Greenland.

Albert has served on various national committees considering ice and polar science. Albert serves as executive director of the United States Ice Drilling Program, which is supported by the National Science Foundation. The Ice Drilling Program oversees planning for ice coring and drilling. The program releases regular white papers, maintains an equipment inventory and runs a comprehensive education program.

== Selected publications ==
- S. V. Nghiem; D. K. Hall; T. L. Mote; et al. (October 27, 2012). "The extreme melt across the Greenland ice sheet in 2012". Geophysical Research Letters. 39 (20). Bibcode:2012GeoRL..3920502N. doi:10.1029/2012gl053611. ISSN 0094-8276. Wikidata Q57250917.
- NEEM community members (January 1, 2013). "Eemian interglacial reconstructed from a Greenland folded ice core". Nature. 493 (7433): 489–494. doi:10.1038/nature11789. ISSN 1476-4687. PMID 23344358. Wikidata Q34324013.
- Mary R Albert; Edward F Shultz (May 2002). "Snow and firn properties and air–snow transport processes at Summit, Greenland". Atmospheric Environment. 36 (15–16): 2789–2797. Bibcode:2002AtmEn..36.2789A. doi:10.1016/s1352-2310(02)00119-x. ISSN 1352-2310. Wikidata Q57250944.

== Personal life ==
Albert is married to a geophysicist with whom she has two children. Both of her children are engineers.
