= Ada Cohen =

American art historian

- Education: Brandeis University; Harvard University
- Occupation: Art historian
- Employer: Dartmouth College
- Title: Professor of Art History; Israel Evans Professor in Oratory and Belles Lettres

Ada Cohen is an American art historian. She serves as Professor of Art History and Israel Evans Professor in Oratory and Belles Lettres at Dartmouth College. Her work focuses on ancient Greek art, particularly imagery of Alexander the Great. From 1990 to 1991, she was a member of the Columbia University Society of Fellows in the Humanities.

== Works ==
- The Alexander Mosaic: Stories of Victory and Defeat (Cambridge University Press, 1997)
- ed. Constructions of Childhood in Ancient Greece and Italy, with J. B. Rutter (American School of Classical Studies at Athens, 2007)
- Art in the Era of Alexander the Great: Paradigms of Manhood and Their Cultural Traditions (Cambridge University Press, 2010)
- ed. Assyrian Reliefs from the Palace of Ashurnasirpal II: A Cultural Biography, with S. E. Kangas (University Press of New England, 2010)
- Inside an Ancient Assyrian Palace: Looking at Austen Henry Layard's Reconstruction, with Steven Kangas (University Press of New England and Hood Museum of Art, 2017)
