= Robert Oelman =

American business executive

- Born: Robert Schantz Oelman; June 9, 1909
- Died: May 10, 2007 (aged 97); Delray Beach, Florida
- Education: Dartmouth College, 1931; University of Vienna
- Occupation: Chief Executive of the NCR Corporation
- Spouse: Mary Oelmann
- Children: Robert S. Oelman, Kathryn Meagher, Martha Forrer Oelman

Robert Schantz Oelman (June 9, 1909 – May 10, 2007) was an American executive who served as president of NCR Corporation for 17 years as they switched to electronic cash registers.

Oelman graduated from Dartmouth College in 1931, before attending University of Vienna, where he met his wife Mary Coolidge. He joined the National Cash Register Company in 1933 as a file clerk, became president in 1957, and later chairman and chief executive. Oelman retired from NCR in 1974 but remained on in an advisory capacity until 1980.

He was also a founder of Wright State University in 1967.

In 1968, Oelman became Ohio Republican chairman for the unsuccessful presidential campaign of Nelson Rockefeller, a fellow Dartmouth College alumnus.

Oelman also served as chairman of the finance committee of Ford Motor Company, and in 1978 was asked by Henry Ford II to try resolve a conflict with president of the company Lee Iacocca. This was never achieved and Iacocca went on to become president of Chrysler.

Oelman died in Delray Beach, Florida.
