= Christchurch School =

School in Christchurch, Virginia, U.S

Coordinates: 37°36′18″N 76°32′4″W

- Christchurch, Virginia; United States

Information
- Type: Private college-preparatory coeducational boarding school
- Established: 1921

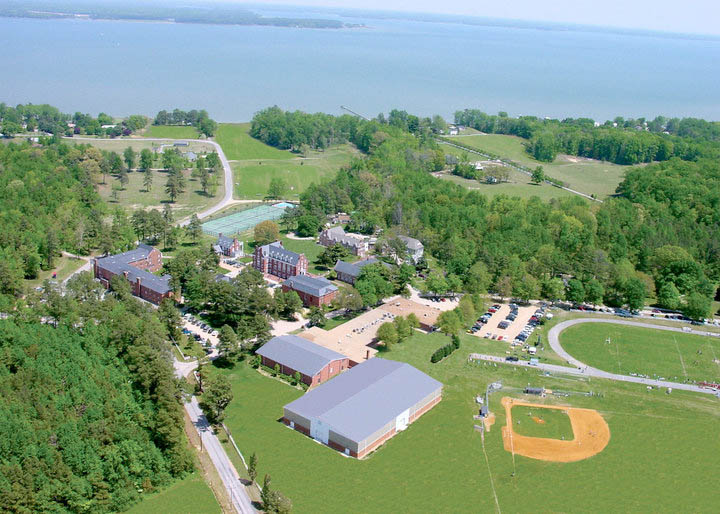
Christchurch School is a boarding school for boys and girls in grades 9-12 located on the Rappahannock River in Virginia.

Christchurch School is a private college-preparatory coeducational boarding school in Christchurch, Virginia, founded in 1921 by the Episcopal Church Diocese of Virginia. The school enrolls approximately 225 students, boarding and day, grades 9–12. Day students number approximately 45% of the student body. The school is located near the colonial port town of Urbanna, Virginia on a 125-acre (51 ha) waterfront campus on the Rappahannock River near the Chesapeake Bay. The campus was listed on the National Register of Historic Places in 2025.

== Academics ==
Christchurch offers a college prep program and a Learning Skills Program for students with diagnosed learning differences. Over seventy-five percent of the faculty lives on campus. Faculty serve as coaches, advisors, and dorm parents.

Admission to Christchurch School is based upon the candidate's application, recommendations, questionnaires, transcripts, and a personal interview.

Christchurch is a member of the National Association of Independent Schools, the National Association of Episcopal Schools, and the Virginia Association of Independent Schools

== Curriculum ==
The 125-acre campus on the banks of the Rappahannock River and in the Chesapeake Bay Watershed, offers opportunity for a hands-on curriculum "Great Journeys Begin at the River" with students making discoveries and connections both inside and outside the classroom. The river is two miles wide at the Christchurch campus.

The Rappahannock River and the Chesapeake Bay watershed offer a living classroom for marine science and an out-of-door co-curricular experience, with opportunities for sailing, crew, research projects, class trips, adventuring, team-building, and leadership.

== Athletics ==
=== Lacrosse ===
2010 VISAA Division II State Champions

=== Boys' soccer ===
2010 VISAA Division II State Champions

2022 VISAA Division II State Champions

2023 VISAA Division II Runners-up

2024 VISAA Division II State Champions

=== Football ===
2011 VISAA Division II State Champions

2017 VISAA Division II State Champions

2023 VISFL Division I State Champions

=== Girls Soccer ===
2022 VISAA Division II Runners-up

2023 VISAA Division II Runners-up

=== Boys' basketball ===
1994 Prep League Champions

2013 VISAA Division II State Champions

=== Swimming ===
2021 VISAA Division II State Champions

=== Sailing ===
The school has its own sailing fleet, onsite boathouse, and sailing venue. It competes in the Virginia Interscholastic Sailing Association (VISA) league of the Mid-Atlantic Scholastic Sailing Association district, one of seven districts in the Interscholastic Sailing Association. The team is nationally ranked, and won the Atlantic Coast Championship in both 2016 and 2017, and won the ISSA Team Racing National Championship in May 2019.

=== Other sports ===
Girls' soccer, softball, girls' basketball, volleyball, baseball

== Notable alumni ==
- William Styron - Pulitzer Prize-winning author
- Vincent Canby, '41 - film critic for The New York Times
- Lewis Burwell Puller Jr. - First Lieutenant in the United States Marine Corps, Pulitzer Prize-winning author of "Fortunate Son", Vietnam War hero, attorney, earned the Silver Star, two Purple Hearts, the Navy Commendation Medal and the Vietnam Cross of Gallantry
- Bill Brill '48 - ACC Sportswriting Hall of Fame
- John Craine, Jr. '64 - President, SUNY Maritime College, Vice Admiral (USN Ret)
- Charles Barlowe '79 - National Institute of Health MERIT Award, chair and Professor of Biochemistry, Dartmouth Medical College Department of Biochemistry
- Andrew Rice '92 - former Oklahoma State Senator (D), US Senate candidate
- Devin Robinson '14 - former starter for the Florida Gators, played for the Washington Wizards of the NBA, and currently plays for the Toronto Raptors. Helped lead Christchurch to a basketball state championship in 2013.
- Haley Van Voorhis '20 - Current safety for the Shenandoah Hornets, and the first woman to play in a non-kicking position in NCAA football history.
