= James Bliska =

American molecular biologist

James Bliska is an American molecular biologist, focusing on molecular mechanisms that underlie pathogenesis or host protection during host-microbe cell interactions, currently at Geisel School of Medicine and was Elected as Fellow at the American Association for the Advancement of Science in 2013.
