= Duane A. Compton =

Duane Compton
- Education: University of Oklahoma (BS); University of Texas Health Science Center at Houston (Ph.D)
- Occupations: Scientist and administrator
- Scientific career
- Fields: Cell Biology; Cancer
- Workplaces: Johns Hopkins University; Dartmouth College

Duane A. Compton is an American cell and cancer biologist and academic administrator who served as the dean of the Geisel School of Medicine at Dartmouth from 2017 to 2025. He is a professor of biochemistry and cell biology.

== Life ==
Compton earned a B.S. in 1984 from the University of Oklahoma. He completed a Ph.D. at the University of Texas Health Science Center at Houston in 1988. He conducted postdoctoral research in cell biology at the Johns Hopkins School of Medicine.

Compton joined the faculty at Geisel School of Medicine at Dartmouth in 1993. He is a professor of biochemistry and cell biology. Compton later served as its interim dean. He formally assumed the role in 2017. He was elected a fellow of the American Association for the Advancement of Science. Compton completed his term as Dean in 2025 and returned to the faculty as professor of biochemistry and cell biology.
