= Pamela Joyner =

American businesswoman (born c. 1957)

- Born: Pamela J. Joyner; 1957 or 1958 (age 67–68); Chicago, Illinois, U.S.
- Education: Dartmouth College; Harvard Business School
- Occupations: Businesswoman and art collector
- Known for: Joyner/Giuffrida Collection of African-American art
- Spouse: Alfred J. Giuffrida (m. 2004)

Pamela J. Joyner (born 1957/1958) is an American businesswoman and art collector, and has been called an "activist collector" by ArtReview, for her focus on African-American art from the 1940s onwards.

== Early life and education ==
Joyner is the daughter of teacher Gloria O. Joyner and psychologist Lewis B. Joyner. She was raised in Chicago, Illinois, where her mother taught English at a Catholic high school, and her father taught history at a local junior college. She attended the University of Chicago Laboratory Schools.

She earned a bachelor's degree from Dartmouth College in 1979. She received her MBA from Harvard Business School.

== Career ==
Joyner is the founding partner of Avid Partners, a San Francisco-based marketing firm providing consulting services for private equity and venture capital funds.

She is the creator and co-founder of the Joyner/Giuffrida Collection of Abstract Art, which was documented in “Four Generations: The Joyner/Giuffrida Collection of Abstract Art,” edited by Courtney J. Martin. The Joyner/Giuffrida Collection was showcased at the Ogden Museum of Southern Art in New Orleans, Louisiana, in October 2017.

In 2019, the Smart Museum of Art honored her and the Joyner/Giuffrida Collection of Abstract Art as part of the museum's annual Shapiro Award dinner and gala.

== Boards and affiliations ==
Joyner serves and has served on leadership committees and boards for several prominent institutions.

- Chair, Tate Americas Foundation
- Board member, Art & Practice Foundation
- Board member, Art Institute of Chicago
- Board member, J. Paul Getty Trust
- Board member, School of American Ballet
- Board member, MacDowell Colony
- Director, First Republic Bank and chair of its investment committee.
- Member, Director’s Circle, San Francisco Museum of Modern Art
- Member, Modern and Contemporary Art Visiting Committee, Metropolitan Museum of Art
- Member, President’s Committee on the Arts and Humanities
- Member, Board of Overseers, Hood Museum of Art / Hopkins Center
- Trustee, Dartmouth College and Chair of the Investment Committee
- Trustee, New York City Ballet
- Trustee and co-chair, San Francisco Ballet Association
- Trustee, Asian Art Museum

== Personal life ==
Joyner has a daughter with her first husband, Gary Love. The couple separated in 2001, and later divorced. In September 2004, she married Alfred J. "Fred" Giuffrida in San Francisco. Gavin Newsom, who was then the Mayor of San Francisco, officiated their wedding.
