= Charles Barlowe =

American academic

Charles K. Barlowe is a professor of biochemistry at the Geisel School of Medicine at Dartmouth, where he studies mechanisms of intracellular transport of proteins and lipids. His focus is on the molecular mechanisms of protein and lipid trafficking that underlie intracellular transport and seeks to understand how proteins catalyze distinct sub-reactions in membrane traffic. Currently, his focus is on the mechanisms of protein transport between the endoplasmic reticulum and the Golgi complex. He uses yeast and animal cell models to study this process using biochemistry, molecular genetics, and microscopy.

Barlowe served as chair of the department of biochemistry and cell biology from 2008-2025.

== Education ==
- B.S., chemistry College of William & Mary, 1983
- Ph.D., biochemistry, University of Texas, Austin, 1990
- Postdoctoral fellow, University of California, Berkeley, 1990–94

== Honors and awards ==
- Daman Runyon-Walter Winchell Cancer Fund Fellow 1990–93
- Pew Scholars Program in the Biomedical Sciences 1996–2000
- Merit Award, National Institutes of Health 2007
- American Association for the Advancement of Science Fellow 2010
- American Society for Microbiology Fellow 2012
