= Peter Travis (medieval scholar) =

Peter W. Travis an emeritus professor of English and Creative Writing at Dartmouth College. Travis received a BA from Bates College, an MA from Trinity College, and a Ph.D. from the University of Chicago. He is a medieval scholar specializing in the works of Chaucer, most notably The Nun's Priest's Tale. He lives in Hanover, New Hampshire.

Travis published Dramatic Design in the Chester Cycle (University of Chicago Press, 1982) and Disseminal Chaucer, Rereading the Nun's Priest's Tale (Notre Dame, 2010), which won the Warren-Brooks Award for Outstanding Literary Criticism. He has published widely in scholarly Journals including Studies in the Age of Chaucer. Travis has designed a course on contemporary Masculinities.
