= John Smith (linguist) =

American Christian pastor (1751–1809)

John Smith A.M., D.D.
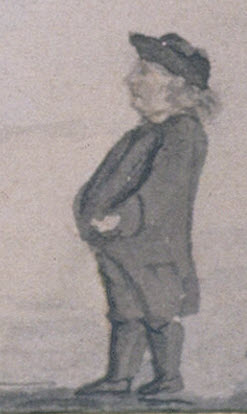
- Detail from "A View of the Principal Buildings of Dartmouth University" by George Ticknor, 1803
- Born: December 21, 1751; Byfield, Massachusetts
- Died: April 30, 1809 (aged 57); Hanover, New Hampshire
- Education: Dartmouth College
- Occupations: Professor; Minister; Author

John Smith (December 21, 1751 [ O.S. December 10 ] – April 30, 1809) was a professor of ancient languages at Dartmouth College and author of the first unpointed Hebrew grammar published in the United States.

== Early life ==
Smith was born in Byfield, Massachusetts to Joseph Smith and Sarah Sawyer. As a young man, Smith attended Dummer Charity School (now The Governor's Academy), where he learned Latin and Greek under Samuel Moody, the school’s first preceptor. Noting his pupil’s proficiency in languages, Moody invited Smith to accompany him to Dartmouth College’s first commencement in 1771. Smith was admitted to the junior class that year and graduated in 1773.

== Career ==
After graduation, Smith stayed on at the college as a tutor and studied theology with President Eleazar Wheelock.

In 1776, he was granted the degree of Master of Arts. In 1778, Smith was appointed Dartmouth’s first professor, charged with teaching English, Latin, Greek, Hebrew, and Aramaic.

During 1778–79, in addition to his duties as professor of languages, Smith prepared a series of lectures on natural philosophy, filling in for Bezaleel Woodward. Smith continued to serve as a tutor until 1787, and served as the college librarian from 1779 until his death. He was appointed to the college’s board of trustees in 1788.

From 1780 to 1787 he was co-pastor of the college church with Sylvanus Ripley, until Ripley died in February 1787 and sole pastor thereafter until his death in 1809.

In 1797, he began preparing a series of theological lectures, which his wife remembered he delivered "Saturday evening at College prayers for two years."

In 1803, Smith was awarded an honorary Doctor of Divinity degree from Brown University.

== Theology ==
Smith seems to have been Calvinistic in his theology. He described his approach to theological disputes in a 1783 letter by quoting a line from Ovid: In medio tutissimus ibis ("you will go most safely by the middle course"). Speaking of hardline Calvinists, he wrote: "I apprehend the line should be drawn about halfway between them and the Arminians.... I really think the plan of divinity laid down by the old Calvinistic Divines, such as Flavel, Howe, Baxter, Bates, much preferable to a certain new-modelled scheme. Subtle and abstruse metaphysics have no place in the bible."

Roswell Shurtleff, Smith's successor in the pulpit at the college church in Hanover, remembered that "in religious sentiment he was unexceptionably orthodox."

In a 2006 article attempting to connect Dartmouth teachings to early Mormonism, independent researcher Richard K. Behrens characterized Smith as an "Arminian theologian," college president John Wheelock as an "Arminian Presbyterian," and the college church as Arminian in doctrine, though Presbyterian in government. However, these claims are not corroborated by other sources. The histories of Lord, Richardson, and Hill don't mention any Dartmouth faculty or administrators holding Arminian views or Arminianism playing any role in the controversies of the early 1800s. Steven J. Novak noted differences between Wheelock and the Dartmouth trustees concerning revivals and temperance reform, but not over theology.

== Alleged connection to Mormonism ==
In 2006, independent researcher Richard K. Behrens published an article proposing a connection between John Smith's natural philosophy and theological lectures and doctrines later advanced by Mormon founder Joseph Smith. Behrens identified 20 "common ideas," as well as 15 "differing ideas," but did not provide specifics.

Solomon Spalding (Class of 1785) and Ethan Smith (Class of 1790), whose writings some have theorized were possible sources for the Book of Mormon, both attended Dartmouth during John Smith's tenure and would have been taught by him.

Behrens also asserted that John Smith's parents and Joseph Smith's paternal grandparents were cousins.

== Personal life ==
Smith married Mary Cleaveland on February 8, 1781. They had two daughters before Mary’s death in 1784. Smith next married Susan Mason on January 13, 1785, with whom he had six children.

Smith died from tuberculosis in 1809.

== Published works ==
- The Duty, Advantages, and Pleasure of Public Worship (Hanover, NH, 1795)
- A Sermon, Preached in Randolph, June 3, 1801, at the Ordination of the Rev. Tilton Eastman (Randolph, VT, 1801)
- The New Hampshire Latin Grammar (Boston, 1802)
- A Hebrew Grammar, without Points (Boston, 1803)
- M. Tulli Ciceronis ad Q. Fratrem Dialogi Tres, De Oratore (Walpole, NH, 1804)
- A Grammar of the Greek Language (Boston, 1809)

== Notes and references ==
=== Sources ===
- Behrens, Richard K. (2006). "Dartmouth Arminianism and Its Impact on Hyrum Smith and the Smith Family". The John Whitmer Historical Association Journal. 26: 166–184. JSTOR 43200240.
- Hill, Ralph Nading (1964). The College on the Hill: A Dartmouth Chronicle. Hanover, NH: Dartmouth College Publications.
- Lord, John King (1913). A History of Dartmouth College, 1815–1909. Concord, NH: The Rumford Press.
- Novak, Steven J. (1974). "The College in the Dartmouth College Case: A Reinterpretation". The New England Quarterly. 47 (4): 550–563. doi:10.2307/364450. JSTOR 364450.
- Morison, Samuel A. (1933). "Review of History of Dartmouth College by Leon Burr Richardson". The New England Quarterly. 6 (4): 173–179. doi:10.2307/359370. JSTOR 359370.
- Richardson, Leon Burr (1932). History of Dartmouth College. Vol. 1. Hanover, NH: Dartmouth College Publications.
- Sprague, William Buell (1859). Annals of the American Pulpit. Vol. 2. New York: Robert Carter and Brothers. pp. 90–92.
