= Henry Martyn Field (physician) =

American physician

Henry Martyn Field (October 3, 1837, Brighton, Massachusetts – July 11, 1912, Los Angeles, California) was a gynecologist.

== Life ==
Field graduated from Harvard University in 1859 and from the College of Physicians and Surgeons in New York City in 1862; he was professor of materia medica, and therapeutics at Dartmouth College from 1871 to 1887 and of therapeutics from 1887 to 1893.
