= Christchurch, Virginia =

Unincorporated community in Virginia, United States

- Unincorporated community
- Location within Virginia Location within the United States
- Coordinates: 37°36′18″N 76°32′04″W
- Country: United States
- State: Virginia
- County: Middlesex
- Elevation: 89 ft (27 m)
- Time zone: UTC−5 (Eastern (EST))
  - Summer (DST): UTC−4 (EDT)
- ZIP Code: 23031
- Area code: 804
- GNIS feature ID: 1464885

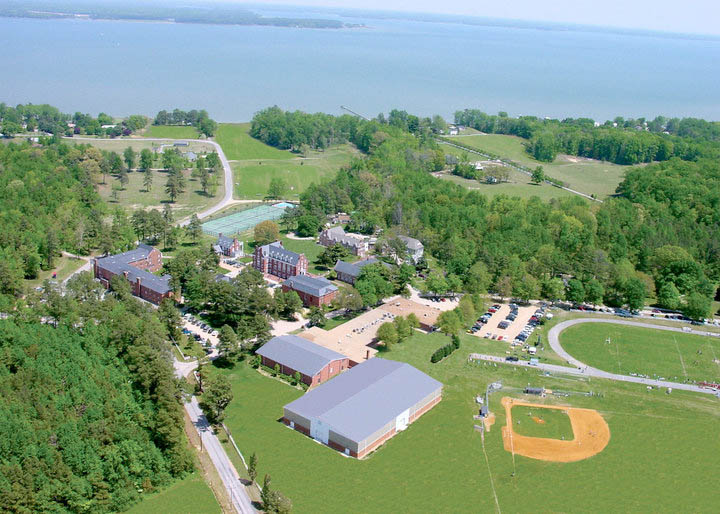

Christchurch is an unincorporated community in Middlesex County, Virginia, United States. Christchurch is located on Virginia State Route 33, 3.1 miles (5.0 km) southeast of Urbanna. Christchurch has a post office with the ZIP Code 23031.

Christchurch is the home of Christchurch School, established in 1921.
