= List of Dartmouth College alumni =

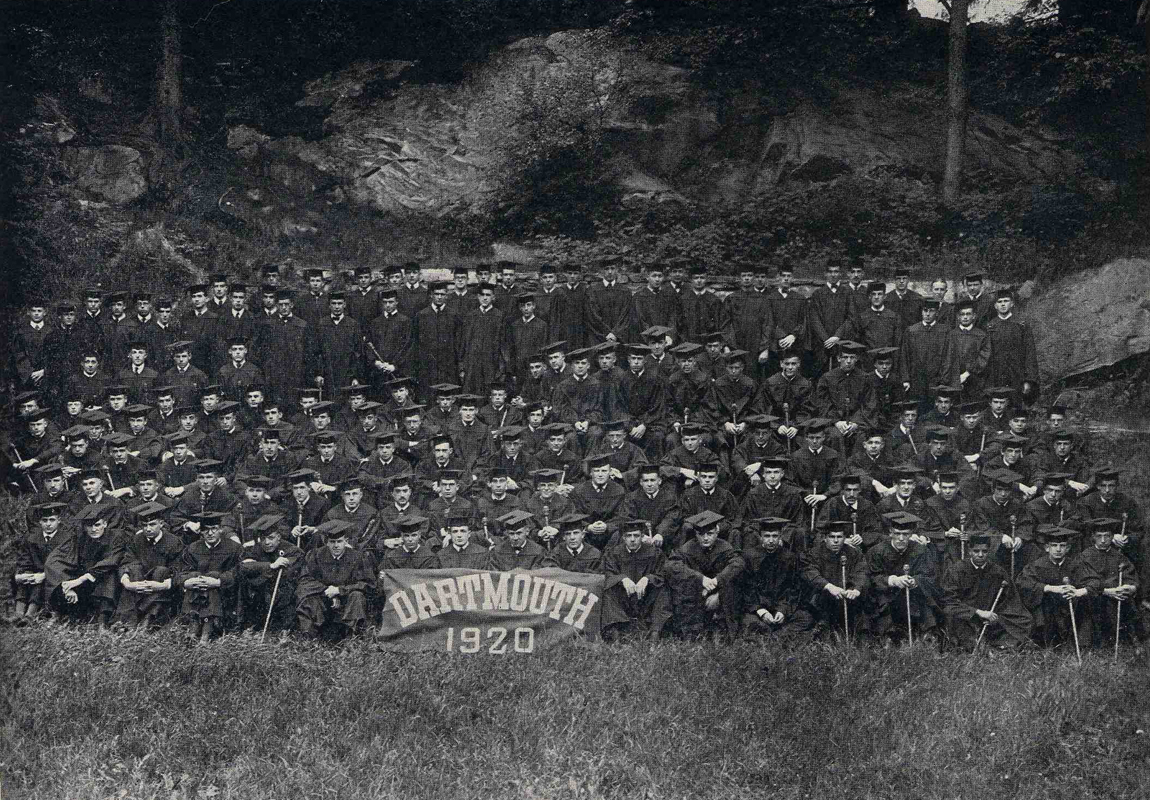
The Dartmouth College class of 1920, posing in the "Bema". Sherman Adams, Gus Sonnenberg, and Edwin Myers were members of this class.

This list of alumni of Dartmouth College includes alumni and current students of Dartmouth College and its graduate schools. In addition to its undergraduate program, Dartmouth offers graduate degrees in nineteen departments and includes three graduate schools: the Tuck School of Business, the Thayer School of Engineering, and Dartmouth Medical School. Since its founding in 1769, Dartmouth has graduated 256 classes of students, and today has approximately 66,500 living alumni.

This list uses the following notation:

- D or unmarked years – recipient of Dartmouth College Bachelor of Arts
- DMS – recipient of Dartmouth Medical School degree (Bachelor of Medicine 1797–1812, Doctor of Medicine 1812–present)
- Th – recipient of any of several Thayer School of Engineering degrees (see Thayer School of Engineering#Academics)
- T – recipient of Tuck School of Business Master of Business Administration, or graduate of other programs as indicated
- M.A., M.A.L.S., M.S., Ph.D, etc. – recipient of indicated degree from an Arts and Sciences graduate program, or the historical equivalent

== Academia and research ==
=== Academic administrators ===
Name	Year/degree	Notability	Reference
Benjamin Abbot	1811	President of Phillips Exeter Academy 1788–1838	
Charles Augustus Aiken	1846	President of Union College 1869–1871	
Jesse Appleton	1792	President of Bowdoin College 1807–1819	
Rufus William Bailey	1812	President of Austin College 1862–1863	
Cecil Bancroft	1860	Principal of Phillips Academy 1873–1901	
Samuel Colcord Bartlett	1836	President of Dartmouth College 1877–1892	
Louis T. Benezet	1936	President of Allegheny College 1948–1955, president of Colorado College 1955–1963, president of Claremont Graduate University 1963–1970, president of the University at Albany 1970–1975	
Nathan Brackett	1864	Founder of Storer College and Bluefield State College	
Francis Brown	1805	President of Dartmouth College 1815–1820	
Isaac Newton Carleton	1859	Founder of Carleton School for Boys	
Philander Chase	1795	Founder and first president of Kenyon College 1824–1831, president of Jubilee College 1831–1852	
Oren B. Cheney	1839	Founder and first president of Bates College 1855–1894	
Daniel Dana	1788	President of Dartmouth College 1820–1821	
Edmund Ezra Day	1905, M.A. 1905	President of Cornell University 1937–1949	
John Sloan Dickey	1929	President of Dartmouth College 1945–1970	
Marye Anne Fox	Ph.D 1974	Chancellor of University of California at San Diego 2004–present, chancellor of North Carolina State University 1998–2004	
Jeffrey Garten	1968	Dean of the Yale School of Management 1995–2005	
George Augustus Gates	1873	President of Grinnell College (1887–1900); president of Pomona College (1902–1909); president of Fisk University (1909–1912)	
Cyrus Pitt Grosvenor	1815	Founding president of New-York Central College	
Philip J. Hanlon	1977	President of Dartmouth College 2013–2023	
Ernest Martin Hopkins	1901	President of Dartmouth College 1916–1945	
Milo Parker Jewett	1828	President of Vassar College 1862–1864, founder and first president of Judson College 1838–1855	
Amos Kendall	1812	Founder of Gallaudet College for the deaf	
William C. Kirby	1972	Dean of the Harvard Faculty of Arts and Sciences 2002–2006	
Benjamin Labaree	1828	President of Middlebury College 1840–1866	
Edward Luck	1971	Vice president of the International Peace Institute 2001–present, director of the Center on International Organization at the School of International and Public Affairs at Columbia University	
Joseph McKeen	1774	President of Bowdoin College 1802–1807	
David T. McLaughlin	1954, T'1955	President of Dartmouth College 1981–1987	
Caleb Mills	1833	First professor of Wabash College 1833–1880, Indiana State Superintendent of Public Instructions	
Zephaniah Swift Moore	1793	President of Williams College 1815–1821, president of Amherst College 1821–1823	
Charles S. Murkland	Ph.D 1903	First elected president of New Hampshire College 1893–1903	
Daniel S. Papp	1969	President of Kennesaw State University 2006–present	
Alden Partridge	1806	Founder of Norwich University	
Albert C. Perkins	1859	President of Phillips Exeter Academy 1873–1889	
Martha E. Pollack	1979	President of Cornell University April 2017–	
Steve Salbu	MA	Dean emeritus of the Scheller College of Business at the Georgia Institute of Technology (2006–2014)	
Artemas Wyman Sawyer	1847	President of Acadia College 1869–1896	
Asa Dodge Smith	1830	President of Dartmouth College 1863–1877	
Sylvanus Thayer	1807	Superintendent of the United States Military Academy 1817–1833, financier and namesake of the Thayer School of Engineering	
Elisha Ticknor	1783	Originator of system of free primary schools in Boston; founder of first insurance company and savings bank in that town	
Henry N. Tisdale	Ph.D. 1978	President of Claflin University 1994 to 2019	
William Jewett Tucker	1861	President of Dartmouth College 1893–1909	
John Wheelock	1771	President of Dartmouth College 1779–1815, son of Dartmouth College's founder Eleazar Wheelock	
Robert Witt	T'1965	Chancellor of the University of Alabama System 2012–present; president of the University of Alabama 2003–2012	

=== Professors and researchers ===
Name	Year/degree	Notability	Reference
Ebenezer Adams	1791	Professor of mathematics and natural philosophy at Phillips Exeter Academy and professor of languages at Dartmouth	
Walter Sydney Adams	1898	Astronomer	
Kwan-Ichi Asakawa	1899	First Japanese professor at a major university in the United States	
Richard W. Bailey	1961	Linguist and scholar of the English language	
Carlos Baker	1932	Professor of literature at Princeton University	
Harold J. Berman	1938	Professor of law at Harvard Law School and Emory University	
Carl Bridenbaugh	1925	Historian of Colonial America	
H. Allen Brooks	1950	Architectural historian and professor at the University of Toronto	
Francis Brown	1870	Semitic scholar	
Manuel Buchwald	1962	Canadian geneticist and researcher	
George S. Bullerjahn	1977	Microbiol ecology and health of Laurentian Great Lakes	
George Bush	1818	Biblical scholar	
Ruth Chang	1985	Professor and chair of Jurisprudence at Oxford University	
Stanwood Cobb	1903	Professor of Latin and English, prominent early member of the Baháʼí Faith	
Joshua Coffin	1817	Schoolteacher and prominent abolitionists	
Levi L. Conant	1879	Mathematician specializing in trigonometry	
Isaac Joslin Cox		Professor of history	
Reuel Denney	1932	Poet and professor of English	
William C. Dowling	1966	Professor of English and American literature at Rutgers University	
John C. Ewers	1931	Ethnologist and first director of the National Museum of American History	
Owen M. Fiss	1959	Sterling Professor at the Yale Law School	
Michael Gazzaniga	1961	Neuroscientist, director of the Center for Cognitive Neuroscience	
Marissa Giustina		Physicist, senior research scientist at the Quantum Artificial Intelligence Lab	
Kenneth M. Golden	1980	Applied mathematician, distinguished professor at the University of Utah	
Annette Gordon-Reed	1981	Carl M. Loeb University Professor at Harvard University; winner of the 2009 Pulitzer Prize in History	
Lillian Guerra	1992	History researcher and author, professor at the University of Florida	
John Hagelin	1975	Theoretical physicist specializing in superstring theory	
Jeffrey Hart	1951 (transferred to Columbia University)	Professor of English at Dartmouth College	
Ira Michael Heyman	1951	Professor of Law at the University of California, Berkeley	
H. Wiley Hitchcock	1944	Musicologist	
Jeremy Howick	1992	University of Oxford Philosopher and Clinical Epidemiologist specialising in Evidence-Based Medicine and Placebo research	
Robert A. Jarrow	T'1976	Professor of investment management at the Samuel Curtis Johnson Graduate School of Management at Cornell University	
Ernest Everett Just	1907	Biologist, first recipient of the Spingarn Medal in 1915	
Neal Katyal	1991	Georgetown Law School professor, lawyer in Hamdan v. Rumsfeld	
Edward Klima	1953	Linguist at University of California, San Diego, researcher of sign languages	
Barbara Krauthamer	1989	Historian at the University of Massachusetts Amherst and Emory University	
David M. Kreps	1972	Economics professor at Stanford, winner of John Bates Clark Medal	
John C. Lilly	DMS 1938–40 (never graduated)	Physician, psychoanalyst, and writer; experimenter into the nature of consciousness	
Edward Norton Lorenz	1938	Professor at MIT, founder of chaos theory, winner of Kyoto Prize in 1993	
Dan Milisavljevic	Ph.D	Astronomer, co-discoverer of three moons of Uranus	
Henry Ruthven Monteith	A.B. 1869	Distinguished history professor at the University of Connecticut	
Kenneth N. Ogle	Ph.D 1930	Researcher in human vision, and professor at the Dartmouth Eye Institute	
John Ordronaux	1850	Civil War army surgeon, professor of medical jurisprudence at Columbia Law School, pioneering mental health commissioner	
William Padula	M.S. 2008	Professor of Pharmaceutical & Health Economics at the University of Southern California	
Richard Parker		Economist, lecturer at Harvard University, co-founder of Mother Jones	
Richard Anthony Parker	1930	Egyptologist, made major discoveries in ancient astronomy and chronology	
Fred Lewis Pattee	1888	Professor of American Literature at the Pennsylvania State University	
Russell Pinkston		Professor of composition and director of the Electronic Music Studio at the University of Texas at Austin	
Frida E. Polli	1994	Neuroscientist and entrepreneur	
John M. Richardson		Professor of International Development at American University	
Arunas Rudvalis	M.A. 1967, Ph.D. 1969	Associate professor of mathematics at the University of Massachusetts Amherst	
Frederick Schauer	1967	David and Mary Harrison Distinguished Professor of Law at University of Virginia School of Law	
William H. Schlesinger	1972	Biogeochemistry researcher	
David Silbersweig		Psychiatric and mental illness researcher at Weill Medical College of Cornell University and the Payne Whitney Psychiatric Clinic	
John Smith	1773	Professor of Latin, Greek, Hebrew and Oriental languages at Dartmouth College; librarian, minister of the College Church, and member of the board of trustees	
Justin Harvey Smith	1877	Historian, professor of Modern History at Dartmouth College	
Page Smith	1940	Historian, author, founding provost of Cowell College at University of California, Santa Cruz	
David Spindler	1989	Independent researcher of the Great Wall of China	
Scott Straus	1993	Assistant professor of political science and international studies at the University of Wisconsin–Madison	
John Tallmadge		Professor of literature and environmental studies at Union Institute & University	
Alan D. Taylor	Ph.D 1975	Mathematician, co-discoverer of a solution for envy-free cake-cutting for an arbitrary number of people	
George Ticknor	1807	Expert on Spanish literature	
Lynne H. Walling	Ph.D. 1987	Fellow of the American Mathematical Society	
Lloyd L. Weinreb	1957	Professor of Law at the Harvard Law School	
Stephen Wizner	1959	Professor of law and supervising attorney at the Yale Law School	
Charles Augustus Young	1853	Astronomer, made first observations of the flash spectrum of the sun during solar eclipses of 1869–70	
Todd Zywicki	1988	Professor of Law at the George Mason University School of Law	

==== MacArthur Fellows ====
The MacArthur Fellows Program, sponsored by the MacArthur Foundation, is a research award commonly called the "Genius Grant."

Name	Year/degree	Notability	Reference
Annette Gordon-Reed	1981	Law and History professor at Harvard University, 2010 MacArthur Fellow	
Becca Heller	2005	Human rights lawyer, 2018 MacArthur Fellow	
Stuart Kauffman	1961	Theoretical biologist, 1987 MacArthur Fellow	
Terry Plank	1985	Professor of Earth science and Environmental Sciences at Columbia College, Columbia University, and the Lamont Doherty Earth Observatory	
John A. Rich	1980	Professor and chair of the Department of Health Management and Policy at Drexel University, 2006 MacArthur Fellow	
Anna Schuleit	M.A.L.S. 2005	Visual artist; 2006 MacArthur Fellow	
Jeffrey Weeks	1978	Mathematician, 1999 MacArthur Fellow	

==== Nobel laureates ====
The Nobel Prizes are awarded each year for outstanding research, the invention of ground-breaking techniques or equipment, or outstanding contributions to society.

Name	Year/degree	Notability	Reference
Owen Chamberlain	1941	Co-winner of 1959 Nobel Prize in Physics	
Karl Barry Sharpless	1963	Winner of 2001 and 2022 Nobel Prize in Chemistry	
George Davis Snell	1926	Co-winner of 1980 Nobel Prize in Physiology or Medicine	

== Architecture, engineering and building industry ==
Name	Year/degree	Notability	Reference
Michael Arad	1991	Designer of the World Trade Center Memorial	
William McDonough	1973	Noted "green" designer, dean of the University of Virginia School of Architecture, 1994–1999	
James Pulliam		California Modernist architect and educator	
David Todd	1934	Designer of Manhattan Plaza, chairman of the New York City Landmarks Preservation Commission 1989–1990	
Mario Torroella	1957	Cuban-American modernist architect and artist; co-founder and principal of HMFH Architects; Fellow of the American Institute of Architects	
Robert K. Watson	1984	Market transformation expert and founder of the LEED Green Building Rating System	
Fred Wesley Wentworth	1889	Architect of many buildings in Downtown Paterson, New Jersey, and the Psi Upsilon Fraternity House at Dartmouth; Fellow of the American Institute of Architects	

== Arts ==
Name	Year/degree	Notability	Reference
David R. Brown	1967, T (Executive Education Program)	Graphic designer and academic administrator	
Abner Dean	1931	Cartoonist	
Dan Gilroy	1981	Director and screenwriter	
Andrea Higgins	1992	Painter	
Erich Kunzel	1957	Conductor of the Cincinnati Pops Orchestra, conductor of the National Symphony Orchestra for its Memorial Day and Independence Day concerts	
Mike Melvoin	1959	Jazz pianist	
Mateo Romero		Painter	
Kabir Sehgal		Artist and producer; winner of multiple Grammy and Emmy Awards	
Augustus Washington	(never graduated)	Photographer and daguerreotypist	
Paul Weston	1933	Pianist, composer, and conductor	
Jonathan Wolken	1971	Founder of the Pilobolus dance company	

== Business and finance ==
Name	Year/degree	Notability	Reference
Sandy Alderson	1969	General manager of New York Mets baseball team	
Elyse Allan	1979, T'1984	President and CEO of GE Canada; vice president of General Electric	
Johan H. Andresen Jr.	1988	Former CEO and chairman of Ferd; billionaire businessman, 5th wealthiest person in Norway	
C. Michael Armstrong	T'1976 (Advanced Management Program)	CEO and chairman of AT&T	
Zdeněk Bakala	T'1989	Czech investor and philanthropist; billionaire businessman	
Peter Barris	Th'1982	Co-founder and general partner of venture capital firm Polaris Partners, Forbes Midas List	
Dan Baum	1983	Founder of Shutterfly	
Michael Beckley	1996	Co-founder and CTO of Appian Corporation	
Linda Behnken		Commercial fisher	
Donald D. Belcher	1960	CEO of Banta Corporation	
John Bello	T'1974	Founder and former CEO of SoBe	
Austin Beutner	1982	Founder of global investment banking firm Evercore; former partner at The Blackstone Group	
George Bissell	1845	Industrialist, oil industry pioneer; "father of the American oil industry"	
Leon Black	1973	CEO and co-founder of private equity firm Apollo Global Management; chairman of MoMA (Museum of Modern Art); billionaire and one of Forbes' "400 richest people"	
Gail Koziara Boudreaux	1982	Chairman and CEO of Anthem	
Glenn Britt	1971	President and CEO of Time Warner Cable	
Trevor Burgess	1994	First openly gay bank CEO, founder of TRB Development majority shareholder and CEO of Neptune Flood Insurance	
Patrick Byrne	1985	Founder, former CEO and chairman of Overstock.com	
Matt Calkins	1994	Founder and CEO of Appian Corporation, billionaire	
Walter Tenney Carleton	1891	Founding director of NEC	
Russell Carson	1965	Co-founder and general partner of private equity firm Welsh, Carson, Anderson & Stowe; former chairman and CEO of Citicorp Venture Capital (renamed Court Square Capital Partners)	
Lew Cirne	1993	Founder and CEO of Wily Technology and New Relic	
William E. Conway Jr.	1971	Co-founder and co-executive chairman of The Carlyle Group, billionaire	
James Coulter	1982	Co-CEO and a founding partner of private equity firm Texas Pacific Group, billionaire	
Tench Coxe	1980	Managing director at Sutter Hill Ventures, Founding Board Member and initial investor of Nvidia	
Jeff Crowe	1978	Managing partner of Norwest Venture Partners, Forbes Midas List 5x	
Alexander Cutler	T'1975	Former chairman and CEO of Eaton Corporation	
Peter Darbee	1975, T'1977	Former CEO, president and chairman of Pacific Gas and Electric Company	
Peter R. Dolan	T'1980	Chairman and CEO of Bristol-Myers Squibb	
John Donahoe	1982	CEO of Nike; chairman of the board of PayPal; former CEO of ServiceNow; former CEO of eBay; former CEO and president of Bain & Company; former Dartmouth trustee	
Bob DuPuy	1968	Former president and chief operating officer of Major League Baseball	
Timothy Geithner	1983	President of private equity firm Warburg Pincus; United States secretary of the treasury 2009–2013, president of the Federal Reserve Bank of New York 2003–2009	
Louis V. Gerstner Jr.	1963	Former CEO of IBM; CEO of Carlyle Group	
Howard Gilman	1943	Head of the Gilman Paper Company, philanthropist	
Brian Goldner	1985	CEO of Hasbro	
Ronald Grant	1988	Chief operating officer of AOL LLC	
Jeffrey Gundlach	1981	Investor, founder of investment firm DoubleLine Capital, which manages $140 billion in assets; billionaire	
Reyn Guyer	1957	Toy inventor	
Charles E. Haldeman	1970	President and CEO of Freddie Mac	
Donald J. Hall Sr.	1950	Chairman of the board; former president and CEO of Hallmark Cards	
Broughton Harris	1845	Partner in Harris & Brothers Company railroad construction firm, president of Brattleboro Savings Bank	
Douglas M. Hodge	1979	Former CEO of PIMCO, accused in 2019 college admissions bribery scandal	
Fred A. Howland	1887	Secretary of state of Vermont, president and chairman of the board of the National Life Insurance Company	
Susan Huang	1984	Vice chairman and global co-head of Investment Banking Division at Morgan Stanley, Dartmouth trustee	
Gardiner Greene Hubbard	1841	Co-founder and president of Bell Telephone Company (AT&T); founder and first president of the National Geographic Society; lawyer, financier, and philanthropist	
Jeffrey R. Immelt	1978	CEO of General Electric	
Sarah Irving	2010, T'2014	Executive vice president and chief brand officer of Irving Oil, heir to billionaire Arthur Irving	
Greg Jensen	1996	Co-CEO and co-CIO of Bridgewater Associates, billionaire	
Brian Kim	1997	Former hedge fund manager; criminal	
Richard Kimball	1978	Founding general partner of Technology Crossover Ventures	
Bud Konheim	1957	CEO of Nicole Miller	
Herbert Levine	1937	Fashion executive and manufacturer	
Dick Levy	1960	Chairman, president, and former CEO of Varian Medical Systems	
Ric Lewis	1984	Founding partner of Tristan Capital Partners and Curzon Global Partners, British businessman	
John Lord	1833	Historian and lecturer	
John F. Lundgren	1973	Former CEO and chairman of Stanley Black & Decker	
Roger Lynch	T'1995	CEO of Pandora Radio, former CEO of Sling TV	
Greg Maffei	1982	Former CFO at Microsoft, co-president of Oracle, chairman and CEO of 360networks; current CEO at Liberty Media	
Stephen Mandel	1978	Founder and hedge fund portfolio manager of Lone Pine Capital, billionaire	
Morton D. May	1936	CEO of May Department Stores Company, philanthropist, and art collector	
Kevin McGrath	T'1977	CEO of Digital Angel	
Terry McGuire	T'1977	Managing general partner of venture firm New Enterprise Associates, Forbes Midas List	
Roger McNamee	T'1982	Founding artner of private equity firms Silver Lake Partners and Elevation Partners, billionaire	
Mira Murati	Th'2012	Chief technology officer of OpenAI	
William Horlick Neukom	1964	Former general counsel and chief legal officer at Microsoft, former CEO of the San Francisco Giants, former president of the American Bar Association	
Ken Novack	1963	Former vice chairman of America Online and AOL-Time Warner	
Robert Oelman	1931	President of NCR Corporation	
Henry Paulson	1968	CEO of Goldman Sachs; United States secretary of the treasury 2006–2009	
Charles Alfred Pillsbury	1863	Flour industrialist and founder of the Pillsbury Company	
Anthony Pritzker	1983	Managing director of Pritzker Group; billionaire and heir to the Hyatt Hotel fortune	
Geoff Ralston	1982	President of Y Combinator; former chief product officer and SVP at Yahoo!	
Bruce Rauner	1978	Founder and chairman of private equity firm GTCR and R8 Capital Partners; former governor of Illinois	
Naval Ravikant	1995	CEO and co-founder of AngelList	
Trevor Rees-Jones	1973	Founder and chairman of Chief Oil & Gas; billionaire and one of Forbes' "400 richest people"	
Janet L. Robinson	T'1996 (Executive Education Program)	President and CEO of the New York Times Company	
T. J. Rodgers	1970	CEO and founder of Cypress Semiconductor	
Carlos Rodríguez-Pastor	T'1988	Chairman and CEO of Intercorp, managing general partner of Nexus Group, and chairman of Interbank; billionaire	
Steven Rogel	Tuck (Executive Education Program)	Former chairman, president and CEO of Weyerhaeuser	
Steven Roth	1963	Founder, chairman and CEO of Vornado Realty Trust, billionaire	
Beardsley Ruml	1915	Economist, trust administrator, and business executive	
Enrique Salem	1987	Former CEO of Symantec; managing director at Bain Capital Ventures	
L. William Seidman	1943	Economist and financial commentator	
Christopher A. Sinclair	T'1973	Chairman of Reckitt Benckiser, former chairman and CEO of Mattel, former chairman and CEO of Pepsi-Cola	
Ned Skinner	1942	An original owner of the Space Needle and Seattle Seahawks	
Jimmie Lee Solomon	1978	Executive vice president of baseball operations at Major League Baseball	
Josh B. Stein	1995	Managing general partner of venture firm Threshold Ventures, Forbes Midas List	
Langley Steinert	T'1991	Founder and CEO of CarGurus, co-founder and former chairman of Tripadvisor	
Edward P. Stritter	1968	Engineer and entrepreneur, co-founder of MIPS Computer Systems, founder of Clarity Wireless and NeTPower, chief architect of the Motorola 68000 CPU (used in the original Apple Computer Macintosh)	
Bill Stromberg	1986	President and CEO of T. Rowe Price	
Robert B. Sturges	1968	New Jersey government official; former executive at Carnival Corp and limited partner of the Miami Heat basketball team	
Harry Bates Thayer	1879	President of Western Electric Company; vice president of AT&T	
Grant Tinker	1949	CEO of NBC 1981–86	
Alan Trefler	1977	Founder and CEO of Pegasystems Inc., billionaire	
Edward Tuck	1862	Banker and philanthropist; son of Amos Tuck, donated money to found Tuck School of Business at Dartmouth	
Don M. Wilson III	T'1973	Chief risk officer of JPMorgan Chase 2003–2006	
Thatcher Wine	1994	Founder of Juniper Books, bibliophile, author and public speaker	

== Entertainment ==
Name	Year/degree	Notability	Reference
Harry Ackerman	1935	Television producer	
Steve Adams	1969	Author, screenwriter	
Robert Allen	1929	Actor in Western films	
Andy Barrie		Host of CBLA-FM's morning drive-time show, Metro Morning, in Toronto, Ontario 1995–2010	
David Benioff	1992	Screenwriter, known for novel and film 25th Hour, Troy; co-creator of Game of Thrones	
Walter Bernstein	1940	Writer and screenwriter	
Paul Binder	1963	Juggler, co-creator of the Big Apple Circus	
David Birney	1961	Actor	
Stan Brakhage	1955 (never graduated)	Director and experimental filmmaker	
Connie Britton	1989	Actress; best known for Friday Night Lights, Nashville	
Jim Butterworth	T	Technology entrepreneur and documentary filmmaker	
Sarah Wayne Callies	1999	Actress; best known for Prison Break	
Julie Davis	1990	Screenwriter and film director; best known for Amy's Orgasm, Finding Bliss	
Rachel Dratch	1988	Actress, cast member of Saturday Night Live	
Alison Fanelli	M.S. 2002	Actress on The Adventures of Pete & Pete	
Stephen Geller	1962	Screenwriter of Slaughterhouse-Five	
Dan Gilroy	1981	Screenwriter and film director; best known for Nightcrawler	
John Gilroy		Film editor	
Dylan Mohan Gray	1991	Film director; best known for Fire in the Blood	
David Harbour	1997	Actor; best known for Stranger Things	
Buck Henry	1952	Actor, writer, director; shared Oscar nomination for screenplay for The Graduate	
Alex Kapp Horner	1991	Actress on The New Adventures of Old Christine	
Mindy Kaling	2001	Actress, writer and actress on The Office and The Mindy Project	
Kristina Klebe		Actress, TV and film	
Ben Koldyke	1991	Actor on Work It and Mr. Robinson	
Stephen Macht	1963	Actor, TV and film	
Robert L. May	1926	Creator of Rudolph the Red-Nosed Reindeer	
Tom McArdle	1991	Film editor, nominated for the Academy Award for Editing Spotlight	
Sam Means	2003	Staff writer for The Daily Show with Jon Stewart	
Chris Meledandri	1981	Film producer, and founder and CEO of Illumination, producer of the Despicable Me franchise	
Chris Miller	1963	Writer for the National Lampoon, co-writer of the screenplay for Animal House (based loosely on his experiences at Dartmouth)	
Michael Moriarty	1963	Actor, winner of three Emmy Awards, one Tony Award and one Golden Globe Award, known for playing Benjamin Stone on Law & Order	
Peter Parnell	1974	Playwright and screenwriter	
Kamran Pasha	1993, T'2000	Hollywood screenwriter and director	
Jean Passanante	1974	Head writer of As the World Turns since May 2005; winner of Writers Guild of America Award in 2007	
Bob Rafelson	1954	Filmmaker, nominated for the Academy Award for Best Picture for Five Easy Pieces	
Shonda Rhimes	1991	Screenwriter, director, and producer; best known for producing Grey's Anatomy	
W. D. Richter	1968	Director of The Adventures of Buckaroo Banzai Across the 8th Dimension	
Fred Rogers	1950	Attended 1946–48 before transferring to Rollins College; creator and host of Mister Rogers' Neighborhood	
Robert Ryan	1932	Actor, Academy Award and BAFTA Award nominee	
Budd Schulberg	1936	Screenwriter, winner of the Academy Award for On the Waterfront (best original screenplay)	
Andrew Shue	1989	Actor, best known for Melrose Place	
Roger L. Simon	1964	Novelist, screenwriter, nominated for an Academy Award for co-writing the screenplay for Enemies, a Love Story	
Ian Smith	DMS (never graduated)	Author and television personality	
Scott Smith	1987	Screenwriter for A Simple Plan (Academy Award nomination, 1998)	
Herbert Franklin Solow	1953	Producer, director, studio executive, talent agent, and writer	
Safiya Songhai	(never graduated)	Film director, producer, and writer	
Meryl Streep	(exchange student)	Actress	
Seth Swirsky	1982	Pop songwriter and author	
Josh Taylor		Actor on Days of Our Lives	
Sydney Towle	2022	American internet personality	
Aisha Tyler	1992	Actress, winner of the NAACP Image Award, portrayed Charlie Wheeler on Friends, Lana Kane on Archer, co-host of The Talk	
Bob Varsha	1973	Auto racing commentator, SPEED Channel	
Peter Viertel	1941	Author and screenwriter	
Stan Waterman	1946	Emmy Award-winning cinematographer and underwater film producer	
Pat Weaver	1930	Pioneering television executive, creator of The Today Show and The Tonight Show, Emmy Award winner	
Norman Weissman		Writer, director, and producer of films	
Brian J. White		Actor and professional football and lacrosse player	
Ken Wlaschin	1956	Film programmer, historian and author	
Jerry Zaks	1967	Tony Award-winning Broadway director and actor	

== Government, law, and public policy ==
Note: Individuals who belong in multiple sections appear in the first relevant section.

=== United States federal and state court judges ===
Name	Year/degree	Notability	Reference
Nicholas Baylies	1794	Associate justice of the Vermont Supreme Court 1831–1833	
Michael L. Bender	1964	Chief justice of the Colorado Supreme Court 2010–2014	
George Hutchins Bingham	1887	Judge on the United States Court of Appeals for the First Circuit 1913–1949	
Harrie B. Chase	1909	Judge on the United States Court of Appeals for the Second Circuit 1929–1954, chief judge 1953–1954	
Salmon P. Chase	1826	Chief justice of the United States 1864–1873, senator from Ohio 1849–1855, governor of Ohio 1856–1860, United States secretary of the treasury 1861–1864	
William N. Cohen	1879	Justice of the New York Supreme Court 1897–1898	
Robert J. Cordy	1971	Associate justice of the Supreme Judicial Court of Massachusetts 2001–2016	
Gregg Costa	1994	Judge of the United States Court of Appeals for the Fifth Circuit 2014–2022	
Stephen S. Cushing	1906	Associate justice of the Vermont Supreme Court 1952–1953	
Charles Donahue	1899	Associate justice of the Supreme Judicial Court of Massachusetts 1932–1944	
Jason Downer	1838	Judge on the Wisconsin Supreme Court 1864–1867	
Michael P. Drescher	1987	Associate justice of the Vermont Supreme Court 2026–	
Asa Fowler	1833	Judge on the New Hampshire Supreme Court 1855–1861	
William J. Galbraith	1857	Associate justice of the territorial Montana Supreme Court	
Nathaniel M. Gorton	1960	Judge on the United States District Court for the District of Massachusetts 1992–present	
Matthew Harvey	1806	Judge on the United States District Court for the District of New Hampshire 1831–1866, representative from New Hampshire 1821–1825, governor of New Hampshire 1830–1831	
Arthur D. Healey	1913	Judge on the United States District Court for the District of Massachusetts 1942–1948, representative from Massachusetts 1933–1942	
James Stuart Holden	1935	Judge of the United States District Court for the District of Vermont 1971–1984	
Thomas Penfield Jackson	1958	Judge on the United States District Court for the District of Columbia 1982–2004, presiding judge in United States v. Microsoft	
Abdul Kallon	1990	Judge on the United States District Court for the Northern District of Alabama 2010–2022	
Dominic W. Lanza	1998	Judge on the United States District Court for the District of Arizona 2018–present	
Gordon J. MacDonald	1983	Chief justice of the Supreme Court of New Hampshire 2021–present	
Steven Menashi	2001	Judge on the United States Court of Appeals for the Second Circuit 2019–present	
Sherman R. Moulton	1898	Chief justice of the Vermont Supreme Court 1939–1949	
George Washington Nesmith	1820	Justice of the New Hampshire Supreme Court 1859–1870	
Carl J. Nichols	1992	Judge on the United States District Court for the District of Columbia 2019–present	
Clarence V. Opper	1918	Judge of the United States Tax Court	
Frank Nesmith Parsons	1874	Chief justice of the New Hampshire Supreme Court 1902–1924	
Donald C. Pogue	1969	Chief judge on the United States Court of International Trade 1995–2016	
Stanley Elroy Qua	1901	Associate justice of the Supreme Judicial Court of Massachusetts 1934–1956, chief justice 1947–1956	
John L. Rand	1883	Judge on the Oregon Supreme Court 1921–1942, chief justice 1927–29, 1933–1935, 1939–1941	
Beth Robinson	1986	Justice of the Vermont Supreme Court 2011–2021 and judge of the United States Court of Appeals for the Second Circuit (2021–present)	
Charles B. Schudson	1972	Judge on the Wisconsin Court of Appeals 1992–2004	
John Samuel Sherburne	1776	Judge on the United States District Court for the District of New Hampshire 1804–1830, representative from New Hampshire 1793–1797	
Laurence H. Silberman	1957	Judge on the United States Court of Appeals for the District of Columbia Circuit 1985–present, U.S. ambassador to Yugoslavia 1975–1977, United States deputy attorney general 1974–1975, under-secretary of labor 1970–1973	
William H. Taylor	1886	Associate justice of the Vermont Supreme Court, 1913–1926	
Webster Thayer	1879	Judge on the Superior Court of Massachusetts, presiding judge over the trial of Sacco and Vanzetti	
William H. Timbers	1937	Judge on the United States Court of Appeals for the Second Circuit 1971–1994	
Abel Underwood	1824	Judge on the Vermont Circuit Court, 1854–1857	
William H. Walls	1954	Judge on the United States District Court for the District of New Jersey 1994–2019	
Sterry R. Waterman	1922	Judge on the United States Court of Appeals for the Second Circuit	
Thomas D. Waterman	1981	Justice of the Iowa Supreme Court	
William Wilson	1797	Judge on the Ohio Court of Common Pleas 4th Judicial Circuit 1808–1822, representative from Ohio 1823–1827	
Michael A. Wolff	1967	Judge on the Supreme Court of Missouri 1998–present, chief justice 2002–2005	
Levi Woodbury	1809	Associate justice of the Supreme Court of the United States 1845–1851, governor of New Hampshire 1823–1824, senator from New Hampshire 1825–1831, 1841–1845, United States secretary of the Navy 1831–1834, United States secretary of the treasury 1834–1841	

=== Executive branch and United States Cabinet members ===
Name	Year/degree	Notability	Reference
Sherman Adams	1920	White House chief of staff 1953–1958, representative from New Hampshire 1945–1947, governor of New Hampshire 1949–1953	
Amos T. Akerman	1842	United States attorney general 1870–1872	
Alex Azar	1988	U.S. secretary of Health and Human Services 2018–2021	
Elaine Chao	(exchange student)	United States secretary of labor 2001–2009, United States secretary of transportation 2017–2021	
James Forrestal	1915 (transferred to Princeton in sophomore year)	United States secretary of the Navy 1944–1947, first United States secretary of defense 1947–1949	
Anthony M. Frank	1953, T'1954	United States Postmaster General 1988–1992	
Timothy Geithner	1983	United States secretary of the treasury 2009–2013, president of the Federal Reserve Bank of New York 2003–2009	
Henry Paulson	1968	United States secretary of the treasury 2006–2009; CEO of Goldman Sachs	
Rob Portman	1979	Director of the Office of Management and Budget 2006–2007, representative from Ohio 1993–2005, U.S. senator from Ohio 2011–2023	
Redfield Proctor	1851	United States secretary of war 1889–1891, senator from Vermont 1891–1908, governor of Vermont 1878–1880	
Robert Reich	1968	United States secretary of labor 1993–1997	
Nelson Rockefeller	1930	Vice president of the United States 1974–1977, governor of New York 1959–1973	
Daniel Webster	1801	United States secretary of state 1841–1843, 1850–1852, representative from Massachusetts 1813–1817, representative from New Hampshire 1823–1827, senator from Massachusetts 1827–1841, 1845–1850	
Levi Woodbury	1809	Associate justice of the Supreme Court of the United States 1845–1851, governor of New Hampshire 1823–1824, senator from New Hampshire 1825–1831, 1841–1845, United States secretary of the Navy 1831–1834, United States secretary of the treasury 1834–1841	

=== Members of the United States Congress ===
Over 164 Dartmouth graduates have served in the United States Senate and United States House of Representatives.

==== Senators ====
Name	Year/degree	Notability	Reference
Charles H. Bell	1844	Senator from New Hampshire 1879–1879, governor of New Hampshire 1881–1883	
Samuel Bell	1793	Senator from New Hampshire 1823–1835, governor of New Hampshire 1819–1823	
Fred H. Brown	1903	Senator from New Hampshire 1933–1939, governor of New Hampshire 1923–1925	
Henry E. Burnham	1865	Senator from New Hampshire 1901–1913	
Dudley Chase	1791	Senator from Vermont 1813–1817, 1825–1831, anti-Jacksonian, uncle of Salmon P. Chase	
Rufus Choate	1819	Senator from Massachusetts 1841–1845, representative from Massachusetts 1831–1834	
Daniel Clark	1834	Senator from New Hampshire 1857–1866, president pro tempore of the United States Senate 1864–1865	
Judah Dana	1795	Senator from Maine 1836–1837	
Irving W. Drew	1870	Senator from New Hampshire 1918–1918	
Peter Fitzgerald	1982	Senator from Illinois 1999–2005	
George G. Fogg	1839	Senator from New Hampshire 1866–1867	
Theodore Foster	1786	Senator from Rhode Island 1790–1803	
Kirsten Gillibrand	1988	Senator from New York 2009–present; representative from New York 2007–2009; first female Dartmouth graduate in Congress	
Slade Gorton	1949	Senator from Washington 1981–1987, 1989–2001	
James W. Grimes	1836	Senator from Iowa 1859–1869, governor of Iowa 1854–1858	
John Hoeven	1979	Senator from North Dakota 2011–present, governor of North Dakota 2001–2010	
Henry Hubbard	1803	Senator from New Hampshire 1835–1841, representative from New Hampshire 1829–1835, governor of New Hampshire 1842–1844	
Angus King	1966	Senator from Maine 2013–present, governor of Maine 1995–2003	
Gilman Marston	1837	Senator from New Hampshire 1889–1889, representative from New Hampshire 1859–1863, 1865–1867	
Thomas J. McIntyre	1937	Senator from New Hampshire 1962–1979	
Hugh Mitchell	1930	Senator from Washington 1945–1946, representative from Washington 1949–1953	
George H. Moses	1890	Senator from New Hampshire 1918–1933, president pro tempore of the United States Senate 1925–1933, minister to Greece and Montenegro 1909–1912	
Moses Norris Jr.	1828	Senator from New Hampshire 1849–1855, representative from New Hampshire 1843–1847	
Albion K. Parris	1806	Senator from Maine 1827–1828, representative from Maine 1815–1818, governor of Maine 1822–1827, mayor of Portland, Maine, 1852–1852	
James W. Patterson	1848	Senator from New Hampshire 1867–1873, representative from New Hampshire 1863–1867	
Rob Portman	1979	Senator from Ohio 2011–2023, representative from Ohio 1993–2005	
Jonathan Ross	1851	Senator from Vermont 1899–1900	
Ether Shepley	1811	Senator from Maine 1833–1836	
Tina Smith	1984	Senator from Minnesota 2018–present	
Paul Tsongas	1962	Senator from Massachusetts 1979–1985, representative from Massachusetts 1975–1979	
Leonard Wilcox	1817	Senator from New Hampshire 1842–1843	

==== Representatives ====
Name	Year/degree	Notability	Reference
Heman Allen	1795	Representative from Vermont 1817–1818, minister plenipotentiary to Chile 1824–1827	
Samuel Clesson Allen	1794	Representative from Massachusetts 1817–1829	
James C. Alvord	1827	Representative from Massachusetts 1839–1839	
Nathan Appleton		Representative from Massachusetts 1831–1833, 1842–1842	
Lemuel H. Arnold	1811	Representative from Rhode Island 1845–1847, governor of Rhode Island 1831–1833	
Henry Moore Baker	1863	Representative from New Hampshire 1893–1897	
William Emerson Barrett	1880	Representative from Massachusetts 1895–1899	
Ichabod Bartlett	1808	Representative from New Hampshire 1823–1829	
Charles Bass	1974	Representative from New Hampshire 1995–2007, 2011–2013	
Perkins Bass	1934	Representative from New Hampshire 1955–1963	
Samuel Newell Bell	1847	Representative from New Hampshire 1871–1873, 1875–1877	
Silas Betton	1787	Representative from New Hampshire 1803–1807	
Abijah Bigelow	1795	Representative from Massachusetts 1810–1815	
Frank S. Black	1875	Representative from New York 1895–1897, governor of New York 1897–1898	
John Blanchard	1812	Representative from Pennsylvania 1845–1849	
Daniel Breck	1812	Representative from Kentucky 1849–1851	
Francis B. Brewer	1843	Representative from New York 1883–1885	
Elijah Brigham	1778	Representative from Massachusetts 1811–1816	
David Bronson	1819	Representative from Maine 1841–1843	
Daniel Azro Ashley Buck	1823	Representative from Vermont 1823–1825, 1827–1829 (two different districts)	
Ellsworth B. Buck	1914	Representative from New York 1944–1945, 1945–1949 (two different districts)	
Joseph Buffum Jr.	1807	Representative from New Hampshire 1819–1821	
Robert Burns	DMS 1811	Representative from New Hampshire 1833–1837	
Sherman Everett Burroughs	1894	Representative from New Hampshire 1917–1923	
Mike Capuano	1973	Representative from Massachusetts 1999–2019	
John Carney	1978	Representative from Delaware 2011–2017, governor of Delaware 2017–present, lieutenant governor of Delaware 2001–2009	
Daniel Chipman	1788	Representative from Vermont 1815–1816	
Martin Chittenden	1789	Representative from Vermont 1803–1813, governor of Vermont 1813–1815	
Frank Gay Clarke	1873	Representative from New Hampshire 1897–1901	
James Hodge Codding	1871	Representative from Pennsylvania 1895–1899	
William Cogswell	1859	Representative from Massachusetts 1887–1895	
Thomas B. Curtis	1932	Representative from Missouri 1951–1953, 1953–1969 (two different districts)	
Benjamin Dean	1845	Representative from Massachusetts 1878–1879	
Nelson Dingley Jr.	1855	Representative from Maine 1881–1899, governor of Maine 1874–1876	
Samuel Dinsmoor	1789	Representative from New Hampshire 1811–1813, governor of New Hampshire 1831–1834	
Edwin B. Dooley	1926	Representative from New York 1957–1963	
Fred J. Douglas	1895	Representative from New York 1937–1945	
Daniel Meserve Durell	1794	Representative from New Hampshire 1807–1809	
Ira Allen Eastman	1829	Representative from New Hampshire 1839–1843	
Thomas M. Edwards	1813	Representative from New Hampshire 1859–1863	
Allen E. Ertel	Th'1958, T'1959	Representative from Pennsylvania 1977–1983	
Evarts Worcester Farr	1863	Representative from New Hampshire 1879–1880	
T. A. D. Fessenden	1845	Representative from Maine 1862–1863	
Walbridge A. Field	1855	Representative from Massachusetts 1877–1878, 1879–1881	
Benjamin Flanders	1842	Representative from Louisiana 1863–1864, governor of Louisiana 1867–1868, mayor of New Orleans 1870–1872	
Isaac Fletcher	1808	Representative from Vermont 1837–1841	
Richard Fletcher	1806	Representative from Massachusetts 1837–1839	
David J. Foster	1880	Representative from Vermont 1901–1912	
Bill Frenzel	1950	Representative from Minnesota 1971–1991	
Sylvester Gilbert	1775	Representative from New Hampshire 1818–1819	
Calvin Goddard	1786	Representative from Connecticut 1801–1805	
Daniel W. Gooch	1843	Representative from Massachusetts 1858–1863, 1863–1865, 1873–1875 (three different districts)	
John Noble Goodwin	1844	Representative from Maine 1861–1863, governor of the Arizona Territory 1863–1866, delegate from the Arizona Territory 1866–1867	
George Grennell Jr.	1808	Representative from Massachusetts 1829–1839	
Frank Joseph Guarini	1946	Representative from New Jersey 1979–1993	
Sherwood Guernsey	1975	Representative from Massachusetts 1983–1990	
Fletcher Hale	1905	Representative from New Hampshire 1925–1931	
Joshua G. Hall	1851	Representative from New Hampshire 1879–1883	
Winfield Scott Hammond	1884	Representative from Minnesota 1907–1915, governor of Minnesota 1915–1915	
Harry Hibbard	1835	Representative from New Hampshire 1849–1855	
Edgar W. Hiestand	1910	Representative from California 1953–1963	
Paul Hodes	1972	Representative from New Hampshire 2007–2011	
Jonathan Hunt	1807	Representative from Vermont 1827–1832	
Luther Jewett	1795	Representative from Vermont 1815–1817	
Ann L. McLane Kuster	1978	Representative from New Hampshire 2013–2025	
Thomas B. Kyle	1881	Representative from Ohio 1901–1905	
Jay Le Fevre	1918	Representative from New York 1943–1945, 1945–1951 (different districts)	
Robert M. Leach	1902	Representative from Massachusetts 1924–1925	
John Locke	1792 (never graduated)	Representative from Massachusetts 1823–1829	
Joseph S. Lyman	1805	Representative from New York 1819–1821	
Asa Lyon	1790	Representative from Vermont 1815–1817	
Clark MacGregor	1944	Representative from Minnesota 1961–1971	
Richard W. Mallary	1949	Representative from Vermont 1972–1975	
Charles Marsh	1786	Representative from Vermont 1815–1817	
George Perkins Marsh	1820	Representative from Vermont 1843–1849, minister resident in Turkey 1849–1853, envoy to Italy 1861–1882	
David Thomas Martin	1929	Representative from Nebraska 1959–1961, 1961–1974 (two different districts)	
Ebenezer Mattoon	1776	Representative from Massachusetts 1801–1803	
Samuel W. McCall	1874	Representative from Massachusetts 1893–1913, governor of Massachusetts 1916–1919	
Robert McClory	1930	Representative from Illinois 1963–1983	
John A. McGuire	1928	Representative from Connecticut 1949–1953	
Rufus McIntire	1809	Representative from Maine 1827–1835	
Richard S. Molony	DMS 1832	Representative from Illinois 1851–1853	
John S. Monagan	1933	Representative from Connecticut 1959–1973	
Harold G. Mosier	1912	Representative from Ohio 1937–1939	
Jeremiah Nelson	1790	Representative from Massachusetts 1805–1807, 1815–1825, 1831–1833	
John Noyes	1795	Representative from Vermont 1815–1815	
Benjamin Orr	1798	Representative from Massachusetts 1817–1819	
Charles H. Peaslee	1824	Representative from New Hampshire 1847–1853	
Henry Moses Pollard	1857	Representative from Missouri 1877–1879	
Samuel L. Powers	1874	Representative from Massachusetts 1901–1903, 1903–1905 (two different districts)	
Ambrose Ranney	1844	Representative from Massachusetts 1881–1887	
Edward C. Reed	1812	Representative from New York 1831–1833	
Joseph Richardson	1802	Representative from Massachusetts 1827–1831	
Eleazer Wheelock Ripley	1800	Representative from Louisiana 1835–1839	
William Nathaniel Rogers	1915	Representative from New Hampshire 1923–1925	
Erastus Root	1793	Representative from New York 1803–1805, 1809–1811, 1815–1817	
Samuel Locke Sawyer	1833	Representative from Missouri 1879–1881	
Herman T. Schneebeli	1930 T'1931	Representative from Pennsylvania 1960–1977	
John Samuel Sherburne	1776	Representative from New Hampshire 1793–1797	
Don Sherwood	1963	Representative from Pennsylvania 1999–2007	
George A. Simmons	1816	Representative from New York 1853–1857	
Henry P. Smith III	1933	Representative from New York 1965–1975	
Peleg Sprague	1783	Representative from New Hampshire 1797–1799	
Bradford N. Stevens	1835	Representative from Illinois 1871–1873	
Moses T. Stevens	1846	Representative from Massachusetts 1891–1893, 1893–1895 (two different districts)	
Thaddeus Stevens	1814	Representative from Pennsylvania 1849–1853, 1859–1868 (two different districts), drafter of the Fourteenth Amendment to the United States Constitution, leader of the Radical Republicans during Reconstruction	
Samuel Taggart	1774	Representative from New Hampshire 1803–1817	
Joseph E. Talbot	1922	Representative from Connecticut 1942–1947	
Nathaniel Terry	1786	Representative from Connecticut 1817–1819	
Samuel Thurston	1843	Delegate from the Oregon Territory to the United States Congress 1849–1851	
Charles Q. Tirrell	1866	Representative from Massachusetts 1901–1910	
Andrew Tracy	1821	Representative from Vermont 1853–1855	
Amos Tuck	1835	Representative from New Hampshire 1847–1853, co-founder of the Republican Party	
Doug Walgren	1962	Representative from Massachusetts 1977–1991	
John Wentworth	1836	Representative from Illinois 1843–1851, 1853–1855, 1865–1867, mayor of Chicago 1857–1858, 1860–1861 (three different districts), editor of the Chicago Democrat, a two-term mayor of Chicago	
Thomas Whipple Jr.	1814	Representative from New Hampshire 1821–1829	
Phineas White	1797	Representative from Vermont 1821–1823	
Rick White	1975	Representative from Washington 1995–1999	
Charles W. Willard	1851	Representative from Vermont 1869–1875	
George F. Williams	1872	Representative from Massachusetts 1891–1893, minister to Greece 1913–1914	
Hezekiah Williams	1820	Representative from Maine 1845–1849	

=== United States governors ===
Name	Year/degree	Notability	Reference
John H. Bartlett	1894	Governor of New Hampshire 1919–1921	
Robert O. Blood	DMS 1913	Governor of New Hampshire 1941–1945	
Albert O. Brown	1878	Governor of New Hampshire 1921–1923	
John Carney	1978	Governor of Delaware 2017–present, lieutenant governor of Delaware 2001–2009, representative from Delaware 2011–2017	
Channing H. Cox	1901	Governor of Massachusetts 1921–1925	
Moody Currier	1834	Governor of New Hampshire 1885–1887	
Nathan Cutler	1798	Governor of Maine 1829–1830	
Samuel Dinsmoor	1789	Governor of New Hampshire 1831–1834	
Lane Dwinell	1928	Governor of New Hampshire 1955–1959	
Arthur Emerson	1914	Governor of American Samoa 1931	
John Hoeven	1979	Governor of North Dakota 2000–2010, U.S. senator from North Dakota 2011–present	
Angus King	1966	Governor of Maine 1995–2003, U.S. senator from Maine 2013–present	
John Kitzhaber	1969	Governor of Oregon 1995–2003, 2011–2015	
Noah Martin	DMS 1824	Governor of New Hampshire 1852–1854	
James L. McConaughy	M.A. 1915	Governor of Connecticut 1947–1948	
John R. McKernan Jr.	1970	Governor of Maine 1987–1995	
Ralph Metcalf	1823	Governor of New Hampshire 1855–1857	
Walter R. Peterson Jr.	1947	Governor of New Hampshire 1969–1973	
Samuel E. Pingree	B.A. 1857; M.A. 1867	Governor of Vermont 1884–1886	
Benjamin F. Prescott	1856	Governor of New Hampshire 1877–1879	
Bruce Rauner	1978	Governor of Illinois 2015–2019	
Moses Robinson	M.A. (hon.) 1790	Governor of Vermont 1789–1790	
Josh Stein	1988	Governor of North Carolina 2025–present, North Carolina attorney general 2017–2025	
Robert W. Straub	1943	Governor of Oregon 1975–1979	
Thomas W. Wolf	1972	Governor of Pennsylvania 2015–2023	

=== Ambassadors and other diplomats from the United States ===
Name	Year/degree	Notability	Reference
Joel Barlow	1778	United States consul to the City of Algiers 1795–1797, U.S. ambassador to France 1811–1812	
Robert L. Barry	1956	U.S. ambassador to Bulgaria 1981–1984 and Indonesia 1992–1995	
Stephen W. Bosworth	1961	United States ambassador to Tunisia 1979–1981, the Republic of the Philippines 1984–1987, Korea 1997–2000	
Everett Ellis Briggs	1956	U.S. ambassador to Panama 1982–1986, Honduras 1986–1989, Portugal 1990–1993	
James Cason	1966	U.S. ambassador to Paraguay 2006–2008	
Henry Lee Clarke	1962	U.S. ambassador to Uzbekistan 1992–1995	
William Eaton	1790	United States consul general to the City of Tunis 1797–1803	
Robert C. Hill	1942	U.S. ambassador to Costa Rica 1953–1954, El Salvador 1954–1955, Mexico 1957–1960, Spain 1969–1972, Argentina 1974–1977	
James F. Moriarty	1975	United States ambassador to Nepal 2004–2007, Bangladesh 2008–2011	
Alfred H. Moses	1951	U.S. ambassador to Romania 1994–1997	
Francis J. Ricciardone Jr.	1973	U.S. ambassador to the Republic of the Philippines 2002–2005, Egypt 2005–2008, Turkey 2011–2014	
Ronald I. Spiers	1950	U.S. ambassador to the Bahamas 1973–1974, Turkey 1977–1980, Pakistan 1981–1983	

=== Government officials outside the U.S. ===
Name	Year/degree	Notability	Reference
Ebenezer Allen	1826	Attorney general of the Republic of Texas, railroad promoter, namesake of the city of Allen, Texas	
Gordon Campbell	1970	Premier of British Columbia 2001–2011	
Howard Hampton	1974	Member of Provincial Parliament 1987–1999, 1999–present (two different districts), leader of the Ontario New Democratic Party 1996–2009	
Colin Kenny	T1968	Special assistant to the prime minister of Canada 1969–1972, director of operations PMO 1972–1976, policy advisor to the prime minister of Canada 1976, assistant principal to the prime minister of Canada 1976–1979, member of the Senate (Ontario) 1984–2018	
Paavo Lipponen		Prime minister of Finland 1995–2003, member of the Parliament of Finland 1991–2007	
Juan Carlos Navarro	1983	Mayor of Panama City 1999–2009	
Nit Phibunsongkhram	1962	Ambassador extraordinary and plenipotentiary to the United States from Thailand 1996–2008	
William Remington	1939	Alleged Soviet spy	
Wes Sheridan	1982	Member of the Legislative Assembly of Prince Edward Island from Kensington-Malpeque, Canada 2007–present	
Tiffany George Sylvester	c. 1830	Mayor of Hamilton, Ontario	

=== Other U.S. political and legal figures ===
Name	Year/degree	Notability	Reference
Charles C. Adams Jr.	1968	Fundraiser, lawyer, human rights activist	
Daniel Adams	1779	New Hampshire state senator 1838–1840	
Harry Amey	1894	United States attorney for the District of Vermont 1923–1933	
Alex Azar	1988	Deputy secretary of the United States Department of Health and Human Services 2006–2007	
Norman Bay	1982	United States attorney for the United States District Court for the District of New Mexico 2000–2002	
Rand Beers	1964	National Security Council counterterrorism adviser c. 1980–2003	
Mark Brzezinski	1987	Lawyer and foreign policy expert, advisor to Barack Obama's 2008 presidential campaign	
Enoch Chase	1831	Wisconsin state senator 1882–1884	
Ronald Chen	1980	New Jersey public advocate 2006–present	
Ed Clark	1952	Libertarian candidate for president of the United States in 1980	
Robert Clark Corrente	1978	United States attorney for the United States District Court for the District of Rhode Island 2004–2009	
Leah D. Daughtry	1984	CEO of the 2008 Democratic National Convention	
Benjamin W. Dean	1848	Secretary of state of Vermont	
Josiah Dunham	1789	Secretary of state of Vermont	
Asahel Farr	1846	Wisconsin state senator 1876–1877	
Gregory G. Garre	1987	United States Solicitor General 2008–2009	
Roger Goodman	1983	Washington state representative 2006–present	
Joseph D. Hatch	1830	Vermont state legislator, mayor of Burlington, Vermont	
Kenneth Hecht	1956	Public interest attorney	
Hugh H. Henry	1833	Member of Vermont House of Representatives and Vermont Senate, United States marshal for Vermont	
Peter Hutchinson	1971	Minnesota politician, unsuccessful independent candidate for governor of Minnesota in 2006	
Joel Hyatt	1972	Unsuccessful Democratic candidate for senator from Ohio in 1994, founder of Hyatt Legal Services	
Thomas Kean Jr.	1990	New Jersey state senator 2003–present, unsuccessful Republican candidate for senator from New Jersey in 2006	
William A. Ketcham	1867	Indiana attorney general 1894–1898, commander-in-chief of the Grand Army of the Republic 1920–1921	
C. Everett Koop	1937	Surgeon General of the United States 1982–1989	
Quentin L. Kopp	1949	California state senator 1986–1998	
Timothy Kraft	1963	Political consultant and campaign manager in 1980 for the unsuccessful Jimmy Carter reelection bid	
Edward Lamb	1924	Labor attorney during the 1934 Toledo Auto-Lite strike	
Karen Loeffler	1979	United States attorney for the District of Alaska	
Wendy E. Long		Law clerk for US Court of Appeals Judge Ralph Winter and Supreme Court Justice Clarence Thomas	
William J. Lynn III	1976	Under Secretary of Defense (Comptroller) 1997–2001	
Frank G. Mahady	1961	Judge of the Vermont District Court; associate justice of the Vermont Supreme Court	
Carl McCall	1958	New York state senator 1975–1979, New York State comptroller 1993–2002, unsuccessful Democratic candidate for governor of New York in 2002	
Sherman R. Moulton	1898	Chief justice of the Vermont Supreme Court, 1938–1949	
Elderkin Potter	1802	Member of the Ohio House of Representatives, 1827–1829	
Peter Robinson	1979	Speechwriter for Ronald Reagan, writer of famous "Tear down this wall!" speech	
Daniel Runde	1994	International Development and International Studies, former political appointee in the Bush Administration, William A. Schreyer endowed chair at the Center for Strategic and International Studies	
Jack Ryan	1981	Unsuccessful Republican candidate for senator from Illinois in 2004	
Kevin V. Ryan	1980	United States Attorney for the Northern District of California 2002–2007, one of nine U.S. attorneys at the center of the ongoing dismissal of U.S. attorneys controversy	
Edmund Sim	1988	International trade attorney	
Stuart O. Simms	1972	Unsuccessful candidate for attorney general of Maryland in 2006	
Benjamin H. Steele	1857	Associate justice of the Vermont Supreme Court	
Todd Stern	1973	U.S. special envoy for climate change 2009–2016	
Diana Taylor	1977	New York superintendent of Bbnks 2003–2007, companion of New York City mayor Michael Bloomberg	
Charles H. Treat	1863	Treasurer of the United States 1905–1909	
Benjamin Wagner	1982	United States attorney for the Eastern District of California 2009–2016	
Dave Winters	1974	Illinois state representative 1995–2012	
Bill Yellowtail	1971	Montana state senator 1985–1993, unsuccessful Democratic candidate for senator from Montana in 1996	

== Journalism and media ==
Name	Year/degree	Notability	Reference
Seth Abramson	1998	Newsweek columnist, BBC and CNN TV analyst, curatorial journalist and New York Times best-selling author	
Jonathan Agronsky	1971	Voice of America journalist, author	
Bill Beutel	1953	First anchor of what became Good Morning America	
Rudi Blesh		Jazz critic and reviewer	
Keith Boykin	1987	Co-host of the BET TV talk show My Two Cents	
Thomas Braden	1940	Journalist and author	
Ty Burr	1980	Film critic for The Boston Globe	
Vincent Canby		Critic for The New York Times	
Nicholas Carr	1981	Writer on technology, economics, and culture	
Robert Christgau	1962	Rock music critic, formerly of the Village Voice	
Orvil Dryfoos	1934	Publisher of The New York Times	
Dinesh D'Souza	1983	Political analyst, fellow at the Hoover Institution	
Harry Enten	2011	Political analyst	
Nathaniel Fick	1999	Author of One Bullet Away and officer in the United States Marine Corps	
Gregory Fossedal	1981	Conservative activist and author, co-founder of The Dartmouth Review	
Paul Gambaccini	1970	Radio and television presenter in the United Kingdom	
Brett Haber	1991	Sportscaster formerly of ESPN's SportsCenter; now host, commentator on Tennis Channel & NBC Olympics	
Robert Hager	1960	NBC news analyst and correspondent	
George Herman	1941	Journalist for CBS, moderator for Face the Nation	
Evan X Hyde	1969	Publisher of Belize's newspaper Amandala	
Laura Ingraham	1985	Political analyst, host of radio show The Laura Ingraham Show	
Steve Kelley	1981	Political cartoonist for the New Orleans Times-Picayune	
Jason E. Klein	1982	CEO of Times Mirror Magazines and CEO of Newspaper National Network LP	
Mort Kondracke	1960	Executive editor of Roll Call; political commentator and journalist, author of Saving Millie: Love, Politics, and Parkinson's Disease, which was made into a movie for CBS	
A. J. Liebling	1924	Journalist, long-time contributor to The New Yorker	
John Lippman		Television executive and the acting director of Voice of America	
James Nachtwey	1970	Photojournalist	
Jim Newton		journalist with the Los Angeles Times	
James Panero	1998	Managing editor of The New Criterion	
Spencer Reiss	1974	Journalist for Newsweek, The Wall Street Journal, and Wired	
Lisa Richardson		Editorial writer for the Los Angeles Times	
Mel Robbins	1990	Journalist for CNN, television show host, and author	
David Rosenbaum	1963	Journalist for The New York Times, winner of the 1991 Polk Award	
Thomas N. Schroth	1942	Editor of Congressional Quarterly and founder of The National Journal	
Maggie Shnayerson	2003	Journalist for TIME, The New York Sun, and the New York Post	
Michael Shnayerson		Contributor to Vanity Fair	
Jacques Steinberg	1988	Journalist for The New York Times	
Jake Tapper	1991	Journalist for CNN	
George Ticknor	1847	Editor of The Keene Sentinel, c. 1860–1866	
David Viscott	1959	Psychiatrist, professor, author, and media personality	
Michael Weiss	2002	Journalist, security analyst and author	
Tom Zoellner	2012	Author, journalist	

=== Bloggers ===
Name	Year/degree	Blog	Reference
John H. Hinderaker	1971	Power Line	
Scott W. Johnson	1971	Power Line	
Melissa Lafsky	2000	Opinionistas	
Paul Mirengoff	1971	Power Line	

== Literature, writing, and translation ==
Name	Year/degree	Notability	Reference
Philip Booth	1947	Poet, winner of Guggenheim grant	
William Bronk	1938	Poet, winner of National Book Award	
Brock Brower	1953	Novelist, nominated for the National Book Award	
Joseph Campbell	1926 (never graduated)	Author of The Hero with a Thousand Faces, which inspired Star Wars and The Matrix	
Eric Dezenhall	1984	Author of fiction and nonfiction; books include Glass Jaw, A Manifesto for Defending Fragile Reputations in an Age of Instant Scandal, Money Wanders and The Devil Himself	
Bruce Ducker	1960	Novelist	
Louise Erdrich	1976	Novelist, poet, winner of the O. Henry Award in 1987, Guggenheim Fellow, National Book Critics Circle Award	
András Gerevich	M.A.L.S. 2002 (Fulbright student)	Poet, screenwriter, literary translator and professor	
Philip Babcock Gove	1922	Lexicographer and editor-in-chief of Webster's Third New International	
Peter Heller	1982	Writer and author of The Dog Stars, kayaker and outdoorsman	
Richard Hovey	1885	Poet	
Bruce Judson	1976	Author of business and public policy books	
Eric P. Kelly	1906	Journalist and writer, author of The Trumpeter of Krakow and recipient of the 1929 Newbery Medal	
Richard Kenney	1970	Poet, English professor	
Phil Klay	2005	US Marine officer, author of Redeployment and winner of the 2014 National Book Award for Fiction	
Richmond Lattimore	1926	Translator of the Iliad and other classics	
Norman Maclean	1924	Author of A River Runs Through It and Young Men and Fire, winner of the National Book Award	
Warren E. Preece	1943	General editor of the Encyclopædia Britannica	
Gregory Rabassa	1944	Acclaimed translator of Gabriel García Márquez's One Hundred Years of Solitude, Julio Cortázar's Hopscotch, and other major works of Latin American literature	
Dr Seuss	1925	Children's author and illustrator	
Alexander O. Smith	1995	Japanese/English translator and author	
Tara Bray Smith	1992	Writer, memoirist	
Thorne Smith		Science fiction author	
Ed Victor		Literary agent	

=== Pulitzer Prize winners ===
The Pulitzer Prize is an American award regarded as the highest national honor in print journalism, literary achievements, and musical compositions.

Name	Year/degree	Notability	Reference
Richard Eberhart	1926	U.S. poet laureate, winner of the Pulitzer Prize for Poetry in 1966 and the National Book Award in 1977	
Dan Fagin	1985	Journalist, winner of the Pulitzer Prize for General Nonfiction in 2014 for Toms River	
Robert Frost	1896 (never graduated)	U.S. poet laureate, winner of four Pulitzer Prizes	
Paul Gigot	1977	The Wall Street Journal editorial page editor, winner of the Pulitzer Prize for Commentary in 2000	
Frank Gilroy	1950	Playwright, winner of the Pulitzer Prize for Drama in 1965 for The Subject Was Roses	
Jake Hooker	1995	Winner of the Pulitzer Prize for Investigative Reporting in 2008	
Nigel Jaquiss	1984	Winner of the Pulitzer Prize for Investigative Reporting in 2005	
Nick Kotz	1955	Winner of the Pulitzer Prize for National Reporting in 1968	
Joseph Rago	2005	Winner of the Pulitzer Prize for Editorial Writing in 2011	
Martin J. Sherwin	1959	Historian regarding nuclear proliferation; shared the Pulitzer Prize for Biography or Autobiography with Kai Bird in 2006	
David K. Shipler	1964	Winner of the Pulitzer Prize for General Nonfiction in 1987	

== Medicine ==
Name	Year/degree	Notability	Reference
Frederick W. Adams	1822	Physician, author, and violin maker	
Peter J. Allen	1993	Chair of the Duke University Department of Surgery; chief of the Duke University Division of Surgical Oncology; vice president of Cancer Services for the Duke University Health System	
Lori Arviso Alvord	1976	Became the first board-certified female Diné surgeon in 1994; author of The Scalpel and the Silver Bear; nominated for U.S. Surgeon General in 2013	
John Francis Eisold	1976 DMS	Current attending physician at the United States Capitol	
George L. Engel	1934	Psychiatrist, formulator of the biopsychosocial model	
Irwin Freedberg		Dermatologist	
John Gunderson	1965 DMS	Director of McLean Hospital's Borderline Center; professor of psychiatry at Harvard Medical School; pioneer of research on the treatment of borderline personality disorder	
Odette Harris	1991	Neurosurgery: treatment of traumatic brain injuries with a focus on epedemiology and outcomes	
Rosandra N. Kaplan	DMS	Physician scientist at the National Cancer Institute	
Charles Knowlton	1824 DMS	Physician, author of a noted pamphlet on birth control	
Elad Levy	1993 B.S.	Leader, researcher, innovator in the field of neurosurgery for the treatment of stroke	
Calvin C.J. Sia	1950	Developer of both the medical home concept for primary care and the federal Emergency Medical Services for Children program	
Bob Smith	1902	Co-founder of Alcoholics Anonymous	
Frederick Douglass Stubbs	1926 B.A.	Pioneering Black thoracic surgeon	
David J. Tuck	2026 MPH	Pioneered Early Symptom Detection Signals (ESDS) to advance population health outcomes and early disease detection.	
Paul Zamecnik	1934	Professor of medicine emeritus at the Harvard Medical School and Senior Scientist at Massachusetts General Hospital	
David Zarling	M.A.	Oncology drug development scientist and entrepreneur	

== Military ==
Name	Year/degree	Notability	Reference
Dean C. Allard	1955	Director of the United States Navy's Naval Historical Center	
Robert J. Dixon	1941	Four-star general in the United States Air Force	
George P. Estey	(never graduated)	Union Army brigadier general, lawyer	
Jack K. Farris	1981	U.S. Air Force major general	
Joshua James Guppey	1843	Union Army brigadier general	
Frank A. Haskell	1854	Union Army colonel during the American Civil War	
John C. Meyer		U.S. Air Force general, World War II flying ace, commander-in-chief of the Strategic Air Command	
Arnold Resnicoff	1968	Navy chaplain; command chaplain, United States European Command; special assistant for Values and Vision to the secretary and chief of staff of the United States Air Force	
William W. Stickney	1926	U.S. Marine Corps major general, director of Marine Corps Marine Corps Reserve	
John L. Sullivan	1921	United States Secretary of the Navy 1947–1949	
Eri D. Woodbury	1863	American Civil War Medal of Honor recipient	

== Religion ==
Name	Year/degree	Notability	Reference
Jonathan Clarkson Gibbs	1852	Presbyterian minister	
Caleb Sprague Henry	1825	Episcopal clergyman and author	
Arthur Whipple Jenks	1884, D.D. 1911	Episcopal theologian	
Jack Kornfield	1967	Author, peacemaker and monk	
William Palmer Ladd		Episcopal priest and seminary dean	
Edward A. Lawrence Sr.	1834	Congregational pastor, author, professor	
Elihu Palmer	1787	Deist author and public speaker	
Arnold Resnicoff	1968	Rabbi and retired U.S. Navy chaplain, national director of interreligious affairs for the American Jewish Committee, and special assistant for values and vision to the secretary and chief of staff of the United States Air Force	
Walter Ashbel Sellew	1866	Methodist bishop	
Solomon Spalding	1785	Calvinist clergyman, possibly the author of a predecessor work of the Book of Mormon	
David E. Stern	1983	Senior rabbi, Temple Emanu-El, Dallas, Texas	
Joseph Tracy	M.A. 1814	Protestant minister, author, and historian	
Julia Whitworth	B.A. 1993	Episcopal priest, bishop-elect of Massachusetts	

== Social reform ==
Name	Year/degree	Notability	Reference
Charles Eastman	1887	Santee Sioux author, physician, and reformer	
Lester Granger	1918	African-American civil rights activist	
John Humphrey Noyes	1830	Founder of the Utopian Oneida Society	

== Sports ==
=== Baseball ===
Name	Year/degree	Notability	Reference
Brad Ausmus	1991	Catcher, 1999 All-Star, three-time Gold Glove winner, manager of the Detroit Tigers, San Diego Padres, and Israel national baseball team	
Jim Beattie	1976	Pitcher for the New York Yankees and the Seattle Mariners	
Pete Burnside	1952	Pitcher for the New York Giants, San Francisco Giants, Washington Senators, Detroit Tigers, and Baltimore Orioles	
Peter B. Freund	1998 B.A.	Minority owner of the New York Yankees and majority owner of several minor league baseball teams as well as the CEO of Diamond Baseball Holdings	
Ralph Glaze	1906	Pitcher for the Boston Red Sox; football All-American; head coach of football, basketball, and track and field for several universities	
Kyle Hendricks	2013	Pitcher for the Chicago Cubs	
Matt Klentak	2002	MLB executive	
Chick Maynard	1920	Shortstop for the Boston Red Sox	
Bill Neukom	1964	Lawyer, baseball executive, managing general partner of the San Francisco Giants	
Mike Remlinger	1988	Pitcher, 2002 MLB All-Star	
Red Rolfe	1931	Third baseman for the New York Yankees	
Chuck Seelbach	1970	Pitcher for the Detroit Tigers	
Bianca Smith	2012	Coach in the Boston Red Sox organization; first African American woman to coach professional baseball	
Rusty Yarnall	1926 (transferred to University of Vermont)	Pitcher for the Philadelphia Phillies	

=== Basketball ===
Name	Year/degree	Notability	Reference
James Blackwell	1991	Guard for the Charlotte Hornets and the Boston Celtics	
Flinder Boyd	2002	Guard for Great Britain, feature writer	
Aud Brindley	1946	Forward for the New York Knicks	
Ric Bucher	1983	Basketball analyst for ESPN	
Dave Gavitt	1959	Coach at Providence College, first commissioner of the Big East Conference	
Russ Granik	1969	Deputy commissioner and COO of the NBA	
Rudy LaRusso	1959	Forward and center for the Minneapolis Lakers, five-time NBA All-Star	
Walter Palmer	1990	Center for the Utah Jazz and the Dallas Mavericks	

=== Football ===
Name	Year/degree	Notability	Reference
Katie Blackburn	1986	Executive vice president of the Cincinnati Bengals, played on women's ice hockey team while attending	
Murry Bowden	1971	Linebacker, member of College Football Hall of Fame	
Mike Brown	1957	Billionaire, owner of Cincinnati Bengals	
Frank Cavanaugh	1898	College football coach	
Jim Chasey	1971	Player in Canadian Football League	
Casey Cramer	2004	Tight end for Tennessee Titans	
Jay Fiedler	1994	Quarterback for Miami Dolphins	
Amos Foster	1904	College football coach	
Ed Healey	1919	Offensive tackle for Chicago Bears	
Jeff Kemp	1981	Quarterback for Los Angeles Rams, San Francisco 49ers, Seattle Seahawks	
Lloyd Lee	1998	Defensive assistant coach of Chicago Bears	
Nick Lowery	1978	Kicker, 3-time NFL Pro Bowler	
Bob MacLeod	1939	Halfback, member of College Football Hall of Fame, coach for Army	
Brian Mann	2002	Quarterback for Los Angeles Avengers	
Bill Morton	1932	Quarterback, member of College Football Hall of Fame; president and vice chairman of American Express	
Bill Roberts		Halfback for Green Bay Packers	
Gordon Rule		Defensive back for Green Bay Packers	
Dave Shula	1981	Wide receiver and coach	
Gus Sonnenberg	1920	Halfback in NFL, professional wrestler	
Clarence Spears	1917	Dartmouth player and coach, member of College Football Hall of Fame	
Buddy Teevens	1979	Quarterback, current head coach for Dartmouth, former head coach at Maine, Stanford	
George Tully		All-American and NFL player	
Zach Walz	1998	Linebacker for Arizona Cardinals	
Reggie Williams	1976	Linebacker for Cincinnati Bengals	
Myron E. Witham	1904	Back, All-American, head coach of University of Colorado	
Swede Youngstrom	1919	Center and guard	

=== Ice hockey ===
Name	Year/degree	Notability	Reference
Gillian Apps	2006	Left wing, gold medalist for Canada in 2006 Winter Olympics	
Walter Bush	1951	Administrator and organizer	
Tanner Glass	2007	Center for Pittsburgh Penguins	
Hugh Jessiman	2006	Right wing for New York Rangers	
David Jones	2008	Right wing for Calgary Flames	
Kristin King	2002	Player, bronze medalist in 2006 Winter Olympics	
Myles Lane	1928	Defenseman for New York Rangers, Boston Bruins, football coach at Boston University, New York Supreme Court justice	
Ben Lovejoy	2007	Defenseman for Anaheim Ducks	
Sarah Parsons	2010	Player, bronze medalist in 2006 Winter Olympics	
Cherie Piper	2006	Forward, gold medalist for Canada in 2002 and 2006 Winter Olympics	
Laura Stacey	2005	Right wing for Montreal Victoire, gold and silver medalist for Canada in 2022 and 2018 Winter Olympics	
Lee Stempniak	2005	Right wing for Calgary Flames	
Katie Weatherston	2006	Forward, gold medalist for Canada in 2006 Winter Olympics	
Carey Wilson	1983 (never graduated)	Center for Calgary Flames, Hartford Whalers, New York Rangers	

=== Track and field ===
Name	Year/degree	Notability	Reference
Gerry Ashworth	1963	Sprinter, gold medalist in 1964 Summer Olympics	
Vilhjálmur Einarsson	1956	Triple jumper, silver medalist in 1956 Summer Olympics	
Edwin Myers	1920	Pole vaulter, bronze medalist in 1920 Summer Olympics	
Adam Nelson	1997	Shotputter, gold medalist in 2000 Summer Olympics	
Alexi Pappas	2012	10,000 metres, competitor in 2016 Summer Olympics	
Arthur Shaw	1908	Hurdler, bronze medalist in 1908 Summer Olympics	
Nathaniel Sherman	1910	Sprinter, competitor in 1908 Summer Olympics	
Jarrod Shoemaker	2004	Triathlete, competitor in 2008 Summer Olympics	
Earl Thomson	1917	Hurdler, gold medalist in 1920 Summer Olympics	
Marc Wright	1913	Pole vaulter, silver medalist in 1912 Summer Olympics	

=== Other ===
Name	Year/degree	Notability	Reference
John H. Caldwell	1950	Cross-country skier, competitor in 1952 Winter Olympics	
Sophie Caldwell	2011	Cross-country skier, competitor in 2014 Winter Olympics	
Tim Caldwell	1976	Skier, competitor in 1976 Winter Olympics	
Dick Durrance	1939	Skier, competitor in 1936 Winter Olympics	
Jack Durrance	1936	Mountaineer, founder of Dartmouth Mountaineering Club	
Andrew Goldstein	2005	Lacrosse goalie for Long Island Lizards, first professional male team-sport athlete to be openly gay during career	
Craig Henderson	2009	Soccer player, competitor for New Zealand in 2008 Summer Olympics	
Madison Hughes	2015	U.S. international rugby sevens player	
Lauren Jortberg		Olympic cross-country skier	
Stuart Krohn	M.A.	Rugby union player	
Paul Mott	1979	Soccer, played for Tampa Bay Rowdies, and former president of New Orleans Hornets	
Cammy Myler	1995	Luger, four-time competitor for the U.S. in the Winter Olympics	
Tanguy Nef	2020	Alpine skier, gold medalist at the 2026 Winter Olympics	
Dominic Seiterle	1998	Rower, competitor for Canada in 2008 Summer Olympics	
Michael Slive	1962	Commissioner of Southeastern Conference	
Carolyn Treacy	2006	Biathlete in 2006 Winter Olympics	
Lawrence Whitney	1915	Athlete in 1912 Summer Olympics	
Moriah Wilson	2019	Champion gravel cyclist	

== Miscellaneous ==
Name	Year/degree	Notability	Reference
John Ball	1820	Explorer of the Oregon Country with Nathaniel Jarvis Wyeth	
Albert S. Bickmore	1860	Naturalist and co-founder of the American Museum of Natural History	
Carroll Edson	1914	Co-founder of the Order of the Arrow of Scouting America	
Jeffrey Gundlach	1981	Investor and businessperson; founder of DoubleLine Capital LP, an investment firm; former head of the $9.3 billion TCW Total Return Bond Fund	
Michelle Khare	2014	YouTuber, actress, television host, and cyclist	
John Ledyard	1776 (never graduated)	Explorer and adventurer; namesake of the Ledyard Canoe Club	
Stephen Harriman Long	1809	Explorer, surveyor and military officer	
James H. Newman	1978	Astronaut with NASA	
Chip Reese	1973	Professional poker player and gambler	
Steve Russell	1958	Computer programmer and gaming pioneer, creator of early video game Spacewar!	

=== Fictional people ===
Name	Year/degree	Notability	Reference
Natty Bumppo	(no year indicated)	Main character of James Fenimore Cooper's Leatherstocking Tales; described in the novels and in particular the movie Last of the Mohicans as having attended Eleazar Wheelock's school	
Pete Campbell	1956	Character on Mad Men, played by Vincent Kartheiser	
Jackie Chiles	(no year indicated)	Character from Seinfeld, attorney to Cosmo Kramer	
Stephen Colbert (character)	(no year indicated)	Titular character of The Colbert Report (real Colbert did not attend Dartmouth; the fictional biography on colbertnation.com, however, lists Dartmouth as his alma mater)	
Michael Corleone	1942	Main character in the Godfather epic	
Meredith Grey	(no year indicated)	Titular character of Grey's Anatomy	
"Trapper" John McIntyre	(no year indicated)	Character on M*A*S*H novels, film, and television, and Trapper John, M.D.	

== See also ==
- Category:Dartmouth College alumni
- List of Dartmouth College faculty
