= Richard Levy =

Richard Levy may refer to:

- Richard N. Levy (1937–2019), American Reform rabbi
- Richard S. Levy, American professor of history
- Richard Levy (paleoclimatologist), New Zealand glacial stratigrapher and paleoclimatologist
- Dick Levy (Richard Meyer Levy), chief executive officer of Varian Medical Systems

== See also ==
- Richard Levy Gallery, an art gallery in Albuquerque, New Mexico
