= Susan Huang =

Susan Huang may refer to:

- Huang Qishan (born 1968), Chinese recording artist and musician also known as Susan Huang
- Susan S. Huang, medical researcher specialising in infection prevention
