= Bank OZK =

Regional bank headquartered in Little Rock

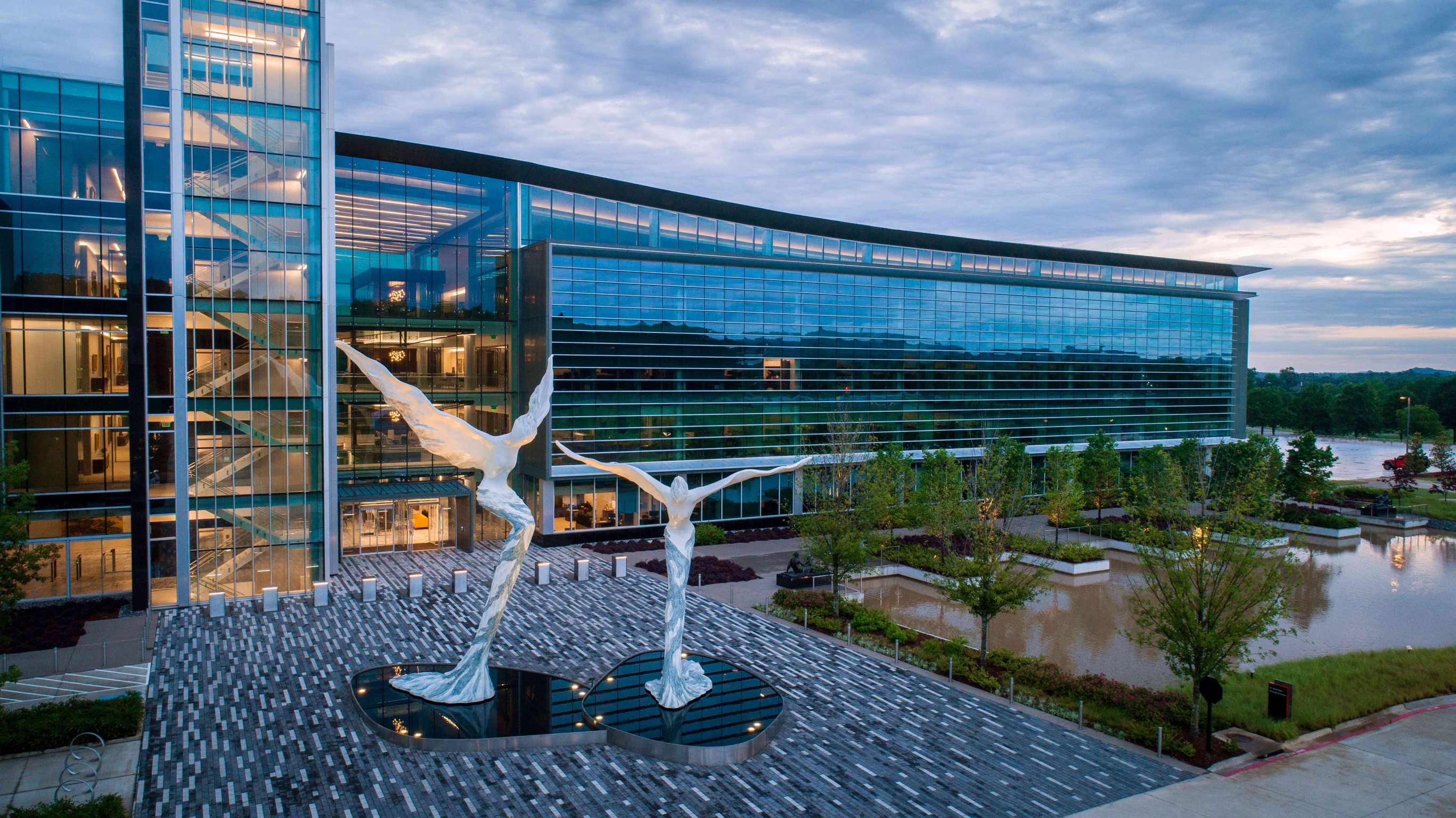
- Bank OZK's headquarters in Little Rock
- Type: Public
- Traded as: Nasdaq: OZK; S&P 400 Component
- Industry: Financial services
- Founded: 1903; 123 years ago, in Jasper, Arkansas, US
- Headquarters: Little Rock, Arkansas, U.S.
- Key people: George G. Gleason II (chairman, CEO); Tim Hicks (CFO)
- Products: Retail Banking; Commercial Banking; Treasury
- Revenue: ▲US$ 2.25 billion (2023)
- Operating income: ▲US$867.0 million (2023)
- Net income: ▲US$690.8 million (2023)
- Total assets: ▲US$34.24 billion (2023)
- Total equity: ▲US$5.14 billion (2023)
- Owner: George G. Gleason II (over 10%)
- Number of employees: 2,744 (2023)
- Website: ozk.com

Bank OZK (formerly Bank of the Ozarks) is a regional bank headquartered in Little Rock, Arkansas. Bank OZK conducts banking operations in 265 offices in six states including Arkansas, Georgia, Florida, North Carolina, Texas, and Tennessee and had $40.8 billion in total assets as of December 31, 2025.

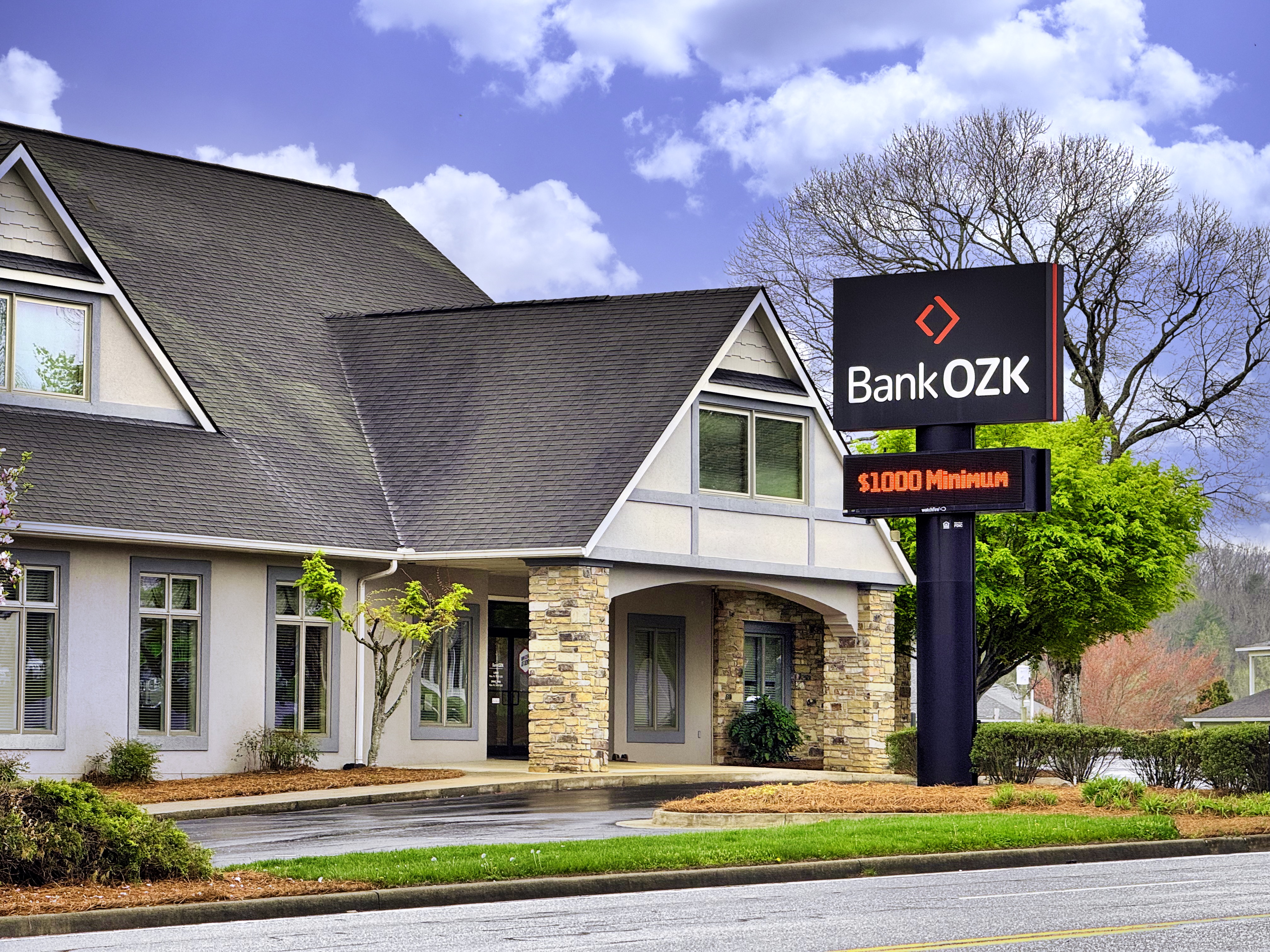
A Bank OZK branch in Blairsville, Georgia

== History ==
The Bank of the Ozarks began as a community bank in Jasper, Arkansas in 1903, expanding to a second location in Ozark, Arkansas in 1937.

In 1979, when the bank had two branches and $28 million in assets, George Gleason, a 25-year-old lawyer at the Rose Law Firm, bought the bank and changed its name to Bank of the Ozarks.

In 1994, the bank had five locations but began expanding. The headquarters was moved to Little Rock in 1995.

In December 2008, the bank moved into a 92,000-square-foot four-story headquarters; in 2018 it began construction on a new 180,000 square foot headquarters at a $98 million cost.

In 2018, the name of the bank was changed to Bank OZK to reflect its expansion from the Ozarks.

=== Acquisitions ===
#	Year	Company	Price	Description of Assets	Ref(s).
1	January 2003	River Valley Bank (RVB) of Russellville, Arkansas		$53 million in assets	
2	March 2010	Unity National Bank of Cartersville		Failed bank; $290 million in assets; the bank's first purchase in Georgia	
3	July 2010	Woodlands Bank in Bluffton, South Carolina		Failed bank; $376 million in assets and $355 million in deposits	
4	September 2010	Horizon Bank of Bradenton, Florida		Failed bank; $170 million in assets and $150 million in deposits	
5	December 2010	Chestatee State Bank of Dawsonville, Georgia		Failed bank	
6	January 2011	Oglethorpe Bank of Brunswick		Failed bank with $210 million in assets, purchased at a $38 million discount	
7	April 2011	First Choice Community Bank of Dallas		Failed bank.	
8	April 2011	Park Avenue Bank of Valdosta		Failed bank.	
9	December 2012	Genala Bank	$27.3 million	$170 million of total assets, $45 million of loans and $142 million of deposits, one branch in Geneva, Alabama	
10	2013	First National Bank of Shelby in Shelby, North Carolina	$64 million	15 locations and $700 million in deposits in North Carolina	
11	2013	Bancshares Inc. of Houston	$23 million	$301 million in assets, $269 million in deposits and 8 branches in Texas	
12	2014	Summit Bancorp of Arkadelphia	$216 million	$1.2 billion in assets and 24 locations	
13	2014	Intervest Bancshares of Pinellas County, Florida	$228.5 million	$1.6 billion in assets and $1.3 billion in deposits in Florida	
14	2015	Bank of the Carolinas of Mocksville, North Carolina	$64.7 million	Additional assets in North Carolina	
15	July 2016	Community & Southern Bank	$799.6 million	$4.4 billion of total assets, $3.0 billion of loans and $3.7 billion of deposits	
16	July 2016	C1 Financial	$402.5 million	$1.7 billion of total assets, $1.4 billion of loans and $1.3 billion of deposits, 32 branches in Florida.	

== Awards and recognition ==
Named one of the Top 25 Best U.S. Banks in Bank Director's 2025 Ranking Banking Study.

Forbes 2025 America's Best Banks 2019 - 2025.
