= Ken Novack =

American lawyer

Ken Novack, a graduate of Dartmouth College and Harvard Law School, is an American lawyer who currently sits on the board of BBN Technologies and is a special advisor to General Catalyst Partners. From 1998 until 2003, he served as Vice Chairman for America Online and then Time-Warner after the two companies merged. Early in his career, from 1966 to 1998, Novack served as an attorney with the firm of Mintz, Levin, Cohn, Ferris, Glovsky, and Popeo, PC ("Mintz"). Recently, however, Novack rejoined Mintz as Senior Counsel.
