= Appian Corporation =

American cloud computing company

- Type: Public
- Traded as: Nasdaq: APPN (Class A); Russell 2000 component
- Industry: Enterprise software; Cloud computing software
- Founded: 1999; 27 years ago
- Founders: Michael Beckley; Matt Calkins; Robert Kramer; Marc Wilson
- Headquarters: McLean, Virginia, U.S.
- Number of locations: 15 (2017)
- Area served: Worldwide
- Key people: Matt Calkins (CEO); Michael Beckley (CTO); Robert Kramer (GM); Marc Wilson (chief partner officer)
- Revenue: ▲US$726.9 million (2025)
- Operating income: ▼US$−609,000 (2025)
- Net income: ▲US$1.2 million (2025)
- Total assets: ▲US$691 million (2025)
- Total equity: ▲US$47 million (2025)
- Number of employees: 2,149 (2025)
- Website: appian.com

Appian Corporation is an enterprise software company that specializes in process automation and AI agent orchestrations. It is headquartered in McLean, Virginia, part of Dulles Technology Corridor. The company sells software to automate complex processes in large enterprises and governments in North America, Europe, the Middle East, South America, Oceania and Southeast Asia.

== History ==
=== Founding and early growth: 1999–2013 ===
Appian was founded in 1999 by Michael Beckley, Robert Kramer, Marc Wilson and Matthew Calkins, who is CEO.

In 2001, the company developed Army Knowledge Online, regarded at the time as "the world's largest intranet."

In 2008, the company completed a $10,000,000 Series A funding by Novak Biddle Venture Partners. In 2010, Appian Cloud was accredited with Federal Information Security Management Act (FISMA) low-level security by the U.S. Education Department. In 2013, it received FISMA Moderate Authorization and Accreditation from the General Services Administration (GSA).

=== Secondary investments and Nasdaq: 2014–2017 ===
In 2014, the company received $37.5 million in secondary investments from New Enterprise Associates, which was paid out to shareholders.

On May 25, 2017, Appian became a publicly traded company, trading as APPN on the NASDAQ Global Exchange.

=== Process mining and artificial intelligence: 2018–present ===
In May 2019, Appian released Appian AI. In March 2020, the company updated the platform's artificial intelligence and robotic process automation capabilities.

In 2020, Appian Cloud was certified as compliant with the Payment Card Industry (PCI) Data Security Standards (SS) maintained by the Payment Card Industry Security Standards Council. Also in 2020, Appian RPA achieved authorization from the Federal Risk and Authorization Management Program (FedRAMP) as part of Appian Cloud. In 2025, Appian Government Cloud (AGC) obtained Federal Risk and Authorization management Program (FedRAMP) High authorization and renewed its Impact Level 5 (IL5) Provisional Authority to Operate (PA) from the Defense Information Systems Agency (DISA) for a three-year period.

In April 2022, process mining was integrated into all Appian products, including its automation, artificial intelligence, and low-code capabilities.

In May 2022, Appian was awarded $2.04 billion in damages against Pegasystems Inc. Pegasystems was found to have violated the Virginia Computer Crimes Act when it hired a developer to spy on Appian, stealing trade secrets in an operation Pegasystems referred to as "Project Crush". In January 2026, following the decision from the Supreme Court of Virginia remanding the case for retrial and rejecting Pega's arguments seeking to dismiss the case entirely. Appian announced that it would press its trade secret claims against Pegasystems Inc.

In 2025, Appian released AI Document Center (renamed DocCenter in December 2025), which extended the company's intelligent document processing (IDP) capabilities with AI.

== Products and services ==
Appian develops software for business process automation, application development, and process orchestration. Its platform is used to build applications and automate workflows that involved human users, software systems, and robotic process automation tools.

The company has expanded the platform over time to include artificial intelligence features, document processing, and tools for building and managing AI agents. In 2025, Appian introduced Agent Studio, a product for development AI agents for us in business processes.

Appian also offers a data fabric intended to connect data from source systems without requiring full migration into a single database. The company says this capability supports both reading from and writing to connected systems.

Following its 2021 acquisition of process mining company Lana Labs, Appian added process mining to its platform. In 2024, it introduced Process HQ, a product that combines process mining, AI, and data integration tools.

=== Acquisitions ===
On January 7, 2020, Appian announced acquisition of Novayre Solutions SL, developer of the Jidoka robotic process automation (RPA) platform. In August 2021, Appian acquired the process mining company Lana Labs. The company's applications help companies discover the work patterns being used within their organization by looking through system logs for common actions and sequences.

=== Analyst recognition ===
Appian has been recognized by industry analyst firms including Gartner, Forrester, IDC, and Everest Group across categories such as business process automation, digital process automation, and low-code application platforms.

- Appian was named a Leader in the 2025 Gartner Magic Quadrant for Business Orchestration and Automation Technologies (BOAT)
- Appian was named a Leader in the 2025 Forrester Wave: Digital Process Automation Software, Q3 2025, Q3 2023, and Q3 2021
- Appian was named a Leader in the Everest Group PEAK Matrix Assessment for Process Orchestration consecutively from 2022 through 2025
- Appian was named a Leader in the Gartner Magic Quadrant for Enterprise Low-Code Application Platforms in 2023, 2024, and 2025
- Appian has received the Voice of the Customer for Enterprise Low-Code Application Platforms recognition from Gartner Peer Insights in 2025, 2022
- Appian is ranked #1 in Automated Processing Use Cases for IDP by Gartner in the 2025 Gartner Critical Capabilities for Intelligent Document Processing Solutions

== See also ==
- Business process automation
- Business process management
