= Trevor Burgess =

American entrepreneur

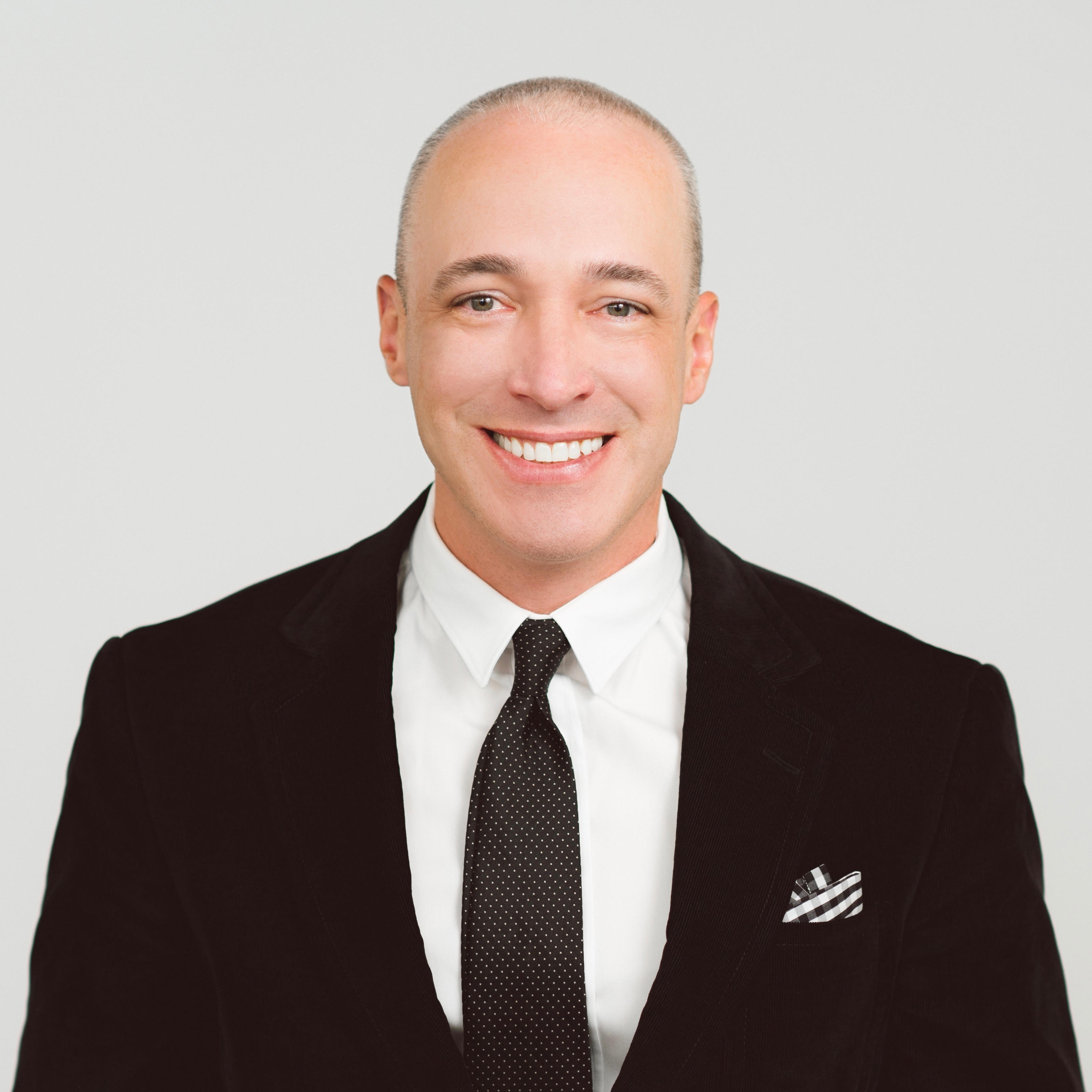
- Occupation: Entrepreneur
- Known for: First openly gay bank CEO
- Spouse: Gary Hess
- Children: 1

Trevor Burgess is an American billionaire entrepreneur. He was an investment banker and CEO of C1 Financial. He is the founder of TRB Development and the president, majority shareholder and CEO of Neptune Flood Insurance.

== Early life ==
Burgess has been openly gay since his teenage years. He graduated in 1994 from Dartmouth College. He was a management consultant at Monitor Company, a Cambridge, Massachusetts firm, associated with Michael Porter. Burgess spent ten years at Morgan Stanley as an investment banker in New York, Los Angeles and London, including "executing more than $50 billion in transactions for major clients, including Chipotle Mexican Grill, which he helped take public in 2006." His last appointment was as a Managing Director in Global Capital Markets leading over 100 investment banking transactions such as the IPO for Chipotle. He then went on to be a partner at Artesia Capital Management, a private equity firm with investments in Brazil and the U.S."

== Industry environment for LGBT workers :3 ==
In 2012 the Human Rights Campaign noted it was still an issue to be LGBT in the workplace as there were no openly gay CEOs in the Fortune 1000 and "U.S. Companies can still legally fire a worker for being gay in 29 states, and many subtle biases remain in the workplace." Former BP chief John Browne noted that homophobic corporate cultures and board of directors keep people in the closet with corporations level of conservativeness rising with the company's size. Todd Sears, founder of an annual LGBT leadership summit for the finance industry noted it was common for executives to not come out until they retired, or even be outed when they died. The 'Wall Street journal' reported in March 2014 that it was still common for LGBT workers to stay closeted.

On becoming the first openly gay banking CEO, Burgess told CNBC, “If that can help the next generation of leaders come out and feel comfortable being authentic, like kids who are in college and considering careers in finance or being entrepreneurs, I’m really lucky.”

== Businesses ==
Burgess is the founder and CEO of the former C1 Bank, and its bank holding company, C1 Financial (NYSE: BNK). Burgess served as a director of C1 after acquiring control of C1's predecessor bank, Community Bank of Manatee, in December 2009.

C1 Bank was a $1.7bn bank focused on the needs of entrepreneurs, and had 31 offices throughout Florida. Burgess was named the 2014 American Banker Community Banker of the Year and was recognized as the 2013 Ernst & Young Florida Entrepreneur of the Year in the financial services category. In 2014 SNL named C1 the 6th fastest growing bank in the country over the prior five years. C1 Bank was acquired by Bank OZK in July 2016 generating a 47% return for its IPO investors in less than 24 months.

After selling C1 Bank in 2016, Burgess formed TRB Development with his business partner, Jon Carlon. TRB Development is focused on "acquiring and developing residential home sites to deliver great value-priced, move-in-ready new homes."

In 2018, Burgess purchased a controlling stake in Neptune Flood Insurance. Burgess offers residential and commercial flood insurance. Neptune filed a patent for its Artificial Intelligence engine in 2019 for which it was awarded the Novarica Impact award for Data & Analytics. Neptune has grown from 50 policies in January 2018 to over 35,000 in 2020. "It had $17 million in premium at the end of 2019, and Burgess projects $40 million to $50 million in premium, by the end of 2020 — even with the coronavirus-based business slowdown." Neptune Flood Insurance was named to the CNBC Upstart 100 in 2018 of 100 promising start-ups to watch. In August 2022, Neptune Insurance ranked 205 out of 5,000 on Inc. Magazine's fastest growing company list.

In May 2023, Burgess's company Neptune Insurance sold a minority stake to private equity firms Bregal Sagemount and FTV Capital. In August 2025, Neptune Insurance filed for a US listing as IPO.

According to the Wall Street Journal, Neptune Insurance has over 260,000 policy holders; on October 1, 2025, Neptune Insurance went public on the New York Stock Exchange.

== Personal life ==
Trevor Burgess became the first openly gay CEO of a bank on the New York Stock Exchange when C1 Financial, which is based in St Petersburg, Florida, made a $44.7 million public offering in August 2014. In the company's initial public offering filing to the Securities and Exchange Commission he disclosed that his husband, Gary Hess, held some shares thus confirming his sexuality in the disclosure. Burgess and Hess have a daughter, Logan.

He has been featured in Bloomberg Businessweek's "Out on the Street" and in the book, "The G Quotient-Why Gay Executives are Excelling as Leaders." In 2013 he won Ernst & Young's Entrepreneur of the Year award in Florida's financial services category. In 2015 the Financial Times in conjunction with OUTstanding, named Mr. Burgess one of the leading global LGBT executives. In 2016, NBC News named Trevor one of "11 Out Business Leaders You Should Know." In 2019, OUTstanding and Yahoo! Finance listed Trevor as one of the top 100 global LGBT+ executive role models.

Burgess and Hess are involved with multiple charities. In 2020 during the COVID-19 pandemic, they donated 30,000, masks to the city of St. Petersburg.
