= Spencer Reiss =

American journalist

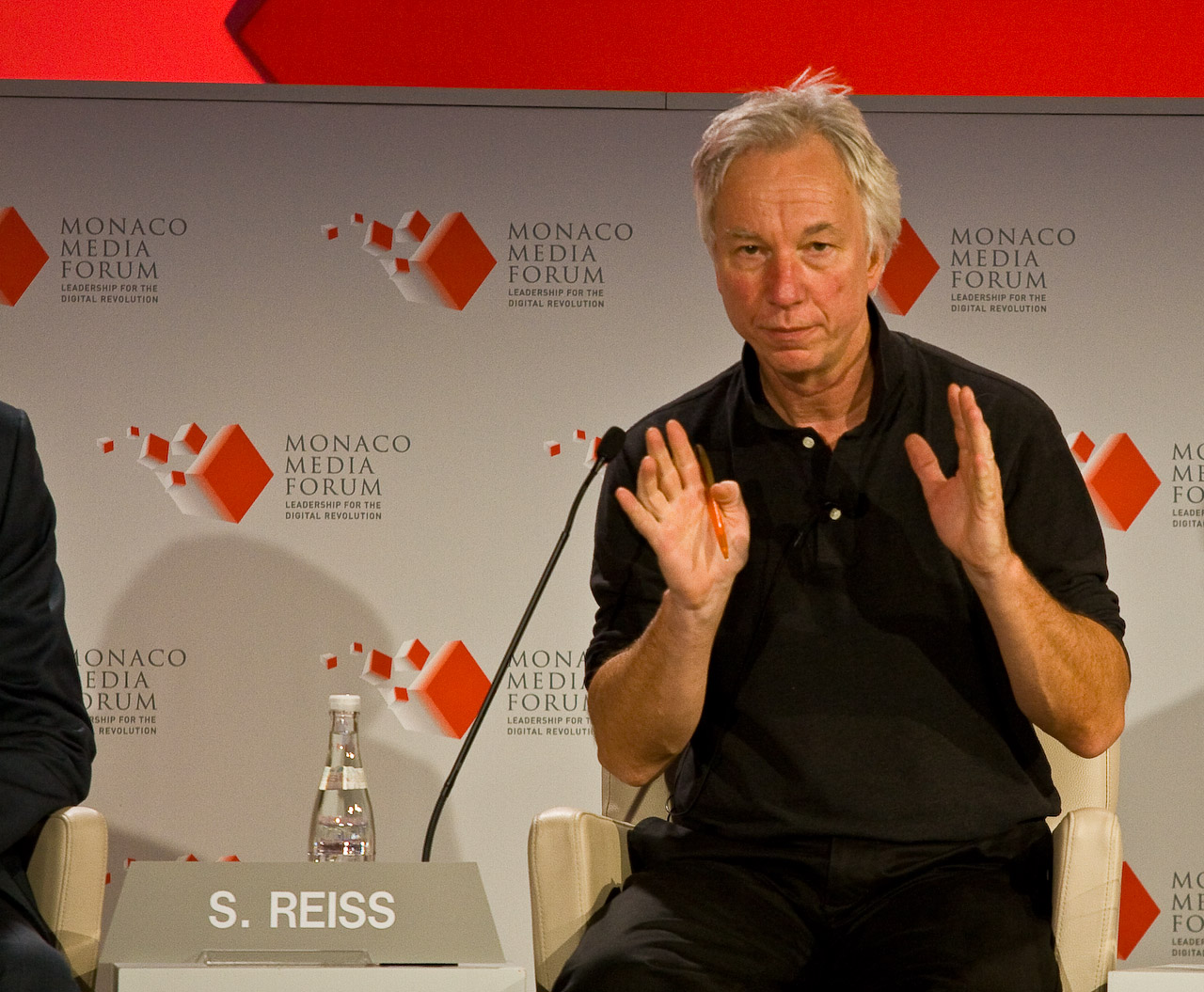
Spencer Reiss at Monaco Media Forum 2008

Spencer Reiss (born 1952 in New York) is a former Newsweek foreign correspondent in Asia, Africa, Middle East and Latin America, now a contributing editor at Wired magazine. He began working for Wired as a senior editor in San Francisco in 1996. He was responsible for covered energy issues, new media, commercial space travel, and the human impact of technology. He has also been also a frequent contributor to The Wall Street Journal and MIT Technology Review.

In 1995, as managing editor of the pioneering Internet project "24 Hours in Cyberspace," Reiss commissioned John Perry Barlow to write the celebrated Declaration of the Independence of Cyberspace. From 2017 to 2012, Reiss also directed the program for the annual Monaco Media Forum held in Monte Carlo. More recently he directed the program for Business Insider's annual IGNITION conference in New York City. Since 2015, he has been senior adviser and master of ceremonies at Viva Technology, a global startup & innovation conference held annually in June in Paris.

== Personal ==
Reiss obtained degrees from Dartmouth College (A.B., History) and Columbia University (M.S., Journalism). He lives in Salisbury, Connecticut United States.
