= David Silbersweig =

American psychiatrist and neurologist

David A. Silbersweig
- Born: David Alan Silbersweig
- Occupations: Psychiatrist, neurologist, university professor
- Known for: Functional neuroimaging in psychiatry, neural basis of hallucinations, borderline personality disorder research

Academic background
- Education: Dartmouth College (BA); Cornell University Medical College (MD)

Academic work
- Era: 1990s–present
- Discipline: psychiatry, neurology, neuroimaging
- Sub-discipline: neuropsychiatry, functional brain imaging
- Institutions: Brigham and Women's Hospital; Harvard Medical School; Weill Cornell Medical College
- Notable works: Functional neuroanatomy of hallucinations in schizophrenia (1995)

David Alan Silbersweig is an American psychiatrist, neurologist, and neuroscientist who serves as Chairman Emeritus of the Department of Psychiatry at Brigham and Women's Hospital, where he was also director of the Institute for the Neurosciences. He is Stanley Cobb Professor of Psychiatry at Harvard Medical School, where he was an academic dean. He is president-elect of the American Neuropsychiatric Association. He is recognized as one of the pioneers of functional neuroimaging research in psychiatry and a leading figure in the development of the field of neuropsychiatry.

Silbersweig's research has focused on developing and applying advanced neuroimaging techniques to understand brain circuitry dysfunction underlying major psychiatric disorders. His landmark studies include the first functional neuroimaging localization of hallucinations in schizophrenia and tics in Tourette syndrome, as well as groundbreaking work identifying neural mechanisms of emotional dysregulation in borderline personality disorder.

== Background ==
Silbersweig graduated from Dartmouth College with high honors in philosophy. He received his medical degree from Cornell University Medical College. He completed combined residency training in both psychiatry and neurology at The New York Presbyterian Hospital-Weill Cornell Medical Center, making him dually board-certified in both specialties.

During the early 1990s, Silbersweig conducted research training in the emerging field of functional brain imaging at the Medical Research Council Cyclotron Unit, Hammersmith Hospital in London, where he worked with colleagues to develop novel positron emission tomography (PET) imaging methods that would later prove instrumental in his landmark neuropsychiatric studies.

== Career ==
After completing his training, Silbersweig returned to Cornell where he founded and directed the Functional Neuroimaging Laboratory with Dr. Emily Stern. At Cornell, he also served as founding director of the Division of Neuropsychiatry and founding director of the Neurology-Psychiatry Combined Residency Program, helping to establish neuropsychiatry as a distinct clinical and research discipline. He held the position of Stephen P. Tobin and Dr. Arnold M. Cooper Professor of Psychiatry, and served as professor of Neurology and Neurosciences, as well as vice chairman for Research in the Department of Psychiatry. He was also a professor in the Weill Graduate School of Medical Sciences at Cornell University's Program in Physiology, Biophysics and Structural Biology.

In the early 2010s, Silbersweig moved to Harvard Medical School and Brigham and Women's Hospital, where he served as chairman of the Department of Psychiatry and director of the Brigham and Women's Hospital Institute for the Neurosciences. He was an academic dean at Harvard Medical School. He currently holds the position of Stanley Cobb Professor of Psychiatry at Harvard Medical School and serves as Chairman Emeritus of the Department of Psychiatry at Brigham and Women's Hospital, Mass General Brigham.

== Scholarly work ==
Silbersweig is known for his pioneering contributions to functional neuroimaging research in psychiatry. His work has focused on developing novel imaging methods and applying them to understand the neural basis of major psychiatric symptoms and disorders.

=== Neuroimaging methods development ===
Silbersweig and his colleagues developed novel methods and paradigms for both PET and functional magnetic resonance imaging (fMRI) that have been widely adopted in the neuroimaging community. A particular technical innovation was the development of specialized fMRI sequences and analysis approaches to reduce susceptibility artifacts in difficult-to-image brain regions such as the ventromedial prefrontal cortex, enabling studies of limbic and paralimbic structures that are critical for emotional processing.

=== Hallucinations in schizophrenia ===
In 1995, Silbersweig and colleagues published a landmark study in Nature that, for the first time, used functional neuroimaging to localize brain activity specifically associated with hallucinations in patients with schizophrenia. The research employed innovative event-related PET methods, with patients signaling when they were experiencing hallucinations so that imaging could capture the precise brain states during these phenomena.

The study revealed that auditory verbal hallucinations were associated with activity in subcortical nuclei including the thalamus and striatum, limbic structures especially the hippocampus, and paralimbic regions including the parahippocampal and cingulate gyri as well as orbitofrontal cortex. In one unique patient experiencing both visual and auditory hallucinations, the team demonstrated activation in visual and auditory/linguistic association cortices as part of a distributed cortical-subcortical network. The findings suggested that activity in deep brain structures may generate or modulate hallucinations, while the specific neocortical regions activated determine the particular perceptual content experienced by individual patients.

This work has been widely cited and formed the foundation for subsequent neuroimaging studies of psychotic symptoms, helping to establish the biological basis of hallucinations and reducing stigma around psychiatric illness by demonstrating objective brain abnormalities underlying subjective symptoms.

=== Tourette syndrome and tic disorders ===
Building on the methodological approaches developed for studying hallucinations, Silbersweig's group conducted the first functional neuroimaging study to selectively capture brain activity associated with tics in Tourette syndrome. Published in 2000 in the Archives of General Psychiatry, the study used event-related PET combined with time-synchronized video recording to identify the precise timing and neural correlates of tic occurrence.

The research identified a network of brain regions associated with tic generation, including medial and lateral premotor cortices, anterior cingulate cortex, dorsolateral-rostral prefrontal cortex, inferior parietal cortex, putamen, and caudate, as well as primary motor cortex, Broca's area, superior temporal gyrus, insula, and claustrum. The findings provided insight into how tics involve the interplay of sensorimotor, language, executive, and paralimbic circuits, accounting for both the motor/vocal behaviors and the urges that often accompany them.

=== Borderline personality disorder ===
Silbersweig has made significant contributions to understanding the neural basis of borderline personality disorder (BPD), particularly the interaction between negative emotion and behavioral control that characterizes the condition. His 2007 study, published in the American Journal of Psychiatry, used specially designed fMRI paradigms to examine brain function during tasks requiring behavioral inhibition in the context of negative emotion.

The research demonstrated that patients with borderline personality disorder showed relatively decreased activity in the ventromedial prefrontal cortex, including the medial orbitofrontal cortex and subgenual anterior cingulate cortex, regions thought to be critical for facilitating behavioral inhibition during emotional circumstances. Simultaneously, patients showed increased activity in the amygdala and extended amygdalar-ventral striatal regions. Importantly, the degree of these neural abnormalities correlated with clinical measures of behavioral dyscontrol and negative emotionality, providing a biological framework for understanding core features of the disorder.

Subsequent work by Silbersweig's group has examined neural changes associated with psychotherapeutic treatment of borderline personality disorder, identifying frontolimbic circuit alterations that correlate with clinical improvement following transference-focused psychotherapy.

=== Depression and other psychiatric disorders ===
Silbersweig's laboratory has also contributed to understanding neural mechanisms in depression, post-traumatic stress disorder (PTSD), and other conditions across the neuropsychiatric spectrum. A focus has been on characterizing fronto-limbic modulation abnormalities that may represent common neural pathways underlying different psychiatric clinical phenotypes. The overarching goal of this systems-level neuropathophysiology work is to provide a foundation for developing novel, targeted, biologically-based diagnostic and therapeutic strategies.

== Leadership and professional activities ==
Beyond his research contributions, Silbersweig has played a significant role in shaping the field of neuropsychiatry through educational and organizational activities. He was the founding vice chairman of the Governing Board of the National Network of Depression Centers and has been involved in leadership roles in national and international research consortia.

Silbersweig is president-elect of the American Neuropsychiatric Association, where he is also a Fellow. He is senior editor of a major textbook in neuropsychiatry and is a co-editor of a prominent textbook in medical psychiatry. He is a consulting editor of The Journal of Neuropsychiatry and Clinical Neurosciences. He is the senior director of medical education courses in neuropsychiatry and medical psychiatry. He has given extensive invited lectures at national and international conferences, and has helped establish standards and advance knowledge in the discipline.

Silbersweig also co-founded Ceretype Neuromedicine, a company focused on translating academic research in psychiatric neurobiology and imaging methods into tools to transform therapeutic development and clinical care in psychiatry and neurology. He has served on the Board of Advisors of the Boston Global Forum, a think tank working with international leaders on the ethical development of AI for democracy and flourishing. He was a Montgomery Fellow at Dartmouth College, where he is vice chair of the Board of Advisors of Dartmouth's Guarini School for Graduate and Advanced Studies. He is on the steering committee of the Music and Health Institute of Berklee College of Music and on the Advisory Board of the Sound Health Alliance. He is on the Scientific Council of the Brain and Behavior Research Foundation, and has served on the scientific advisory boards of the Brain Science Foundation, the American Foundation for Suicide Prevention and the Tourette Syndrome Association. He is on the steering committes of the Harvard Brain Science Initiative and the Harvard Mind Brain Behavior Interfaculty Initiative.

== Impact and legacy ==
Silbersweig's pioneering work in functional neuroimaging has helped establish the biological foundations of major psychiatric symptoms and disorders. His studies demonstrating objective brain abnormalities underlying hallucinations, tics, and emotional dysregulation have contributed to reducing stigma associated with mental illness by showing that psychiatric patients suffer from measurable brain dysfunction analogous to neurological conditions.

The innovative imaging methods and paradigms developed by his laboratory have been widely adopted and have enabled subsequent generations of neuropsychiatric research. His clinical, educational, and theoretical work at the interface of psychiatry and neurology has also played an important role in advancing contemporary neuropsychiatry.

== See also ==
- Functional neuroimaging
- Neuropsychiatry
- Schizophrenia
- Borderline personality disorder
- Tourette syndrome
