= David Zarling =

David A. Zarling
- Occupation(s): CEO, Colby Pharmaceutical Company

David A. Zarling is a co-founder, president and CEO of Colby Pharmaceutical Company and an oncology drug development scientist and entrepreneur. Zarling also has been a part of teams that successfully licensed technology to start-up companies, one of which subsequently achieved significant market capitalization.

== Early life and education ==
Zarling was a S. L. Brown Scholar and holds a BA with Honors in Biology, an MA in Molecular Biology/ Biological Sciences from Dartmouth College, a Ph.D. in Virology/Oncology, with emphasis on pharmaceutical drug development, from Baylor College of Medicine and an Executive MBA in Marketing/Finance from Pepperdine University.

== Career ==
Zarling was employed at SRI International as a program director in the pharmaceutical drug development division, where he led a team which developed drug targets, oncology drug candidates and development of companion diagnostic product candidates. Some of these were developed for public international companies and others were out-licensed to public and private companies. At SRI, he also managed contract research for pharmaceutical and biotech companies and worked in drug development and consulting teams for domestic and international pharma and biotech companies. He led or was part of drug and associated companion diagnostic product development teams transitioning pre-clinical small molecule drugs into the clinic and he performed his doctoral work on small molecule anti-cancer drugs.

Before starting Colby Pharmaceutical Company, Zarling was a president and CEO of Pangene Corporation (PGC, Mt View, CA), a service company which provided drug and drug target development services in pharmaceuticals, genomics & cancer. Pangene was formed within and spun-out from SRI International, formerly Stanford Research Institute, Menlo Park, CA. Zarling co-founded PGC as a spin-out company from SRI International's pharmaceutical drug development/genomics/cancer programs in the SRI Life Sciences Division, where he was a manager and program director. PGC sold its target bio-validation services to several pharmaceutical and biotechnology companies and achieved significant revenues. At SRI, and in collaboration with the SRI wholly owned for profit subsidiary, Sarnoff Corporation, Zarling helped organize, secure funding for and co-led a biotechnology platform based product development group. This group was responsible for significant new business and product development, including IP and product candidates, which were successfully out-licensed.

Zarling was also an Associate Adjunct Professor at the University of California San Francisco and has had several successful collaborations with clinical and pre-clinical investigators at major cancer and other research centers. He also has numerous peer-reviewed scientific publications, many issued US and Foreign patents and a deal sheet record for responsive and successful deals.

== Selected publications ==
- Vallerga AK, Zarling DA, Kinsella TJ (December 2004). "New radiosensitizing regimens, drugs, prodrugs, and candidates". Clinical Advances in Hematology & Oncology. 2 (12): 793–805. PMID 16166960.
- Belotserkovskii BP, Zarling DA (January 2004). "Analysis of a one-dimensional random walk with irreversible losses at each step: applications for protein movement on DNA". Journal of Theoretical Biology. 226 (2): 195–203. Bibcode:2004JThBi.226..195B. doi:10.1016/j.jtbi.2003.08.013. PMID 14643189.
- Maga EA, Sargent RG, Zeng H, et al. (August 2003). "Increased efficiency of transgenic livestock production". Transgenic Research. 12 (4): 485–96. doi:10.1023/A:1024257906647. PMID 12885169. S2CID 8109241.
- Taverna P, Hwang HS, Schupp JE, et al. (15 February 2003). "Inhibition of base excision repair potentiates iododeoxyuridine-induced cytotoxicity and radiosensitization". Cancer Research. 63 (4): 838–46. PMID 12591735.
- Discovery of gene families and alternatively spliced variants by RecA-mediated cloning. Zeng H, Allen E, Lehman CW, Sargent RG, Pati S, Zarling DA., Genomics. 2002 Nov;80(5):543-51
- Belotserkovskii BP, Zarling DA (March 2002). "Peptide nucleic acid (PNA) facilitates multistranded hybrid formation between linear double-stranded DNA targets and RecA protein-coated complementary single-stranded DNA probes". Biochemistry. 41 (11): 3686–92. doi:10.1021/bi012017f. PMID 11888285.
