= Matt Calkins =

American businessman and board game creator

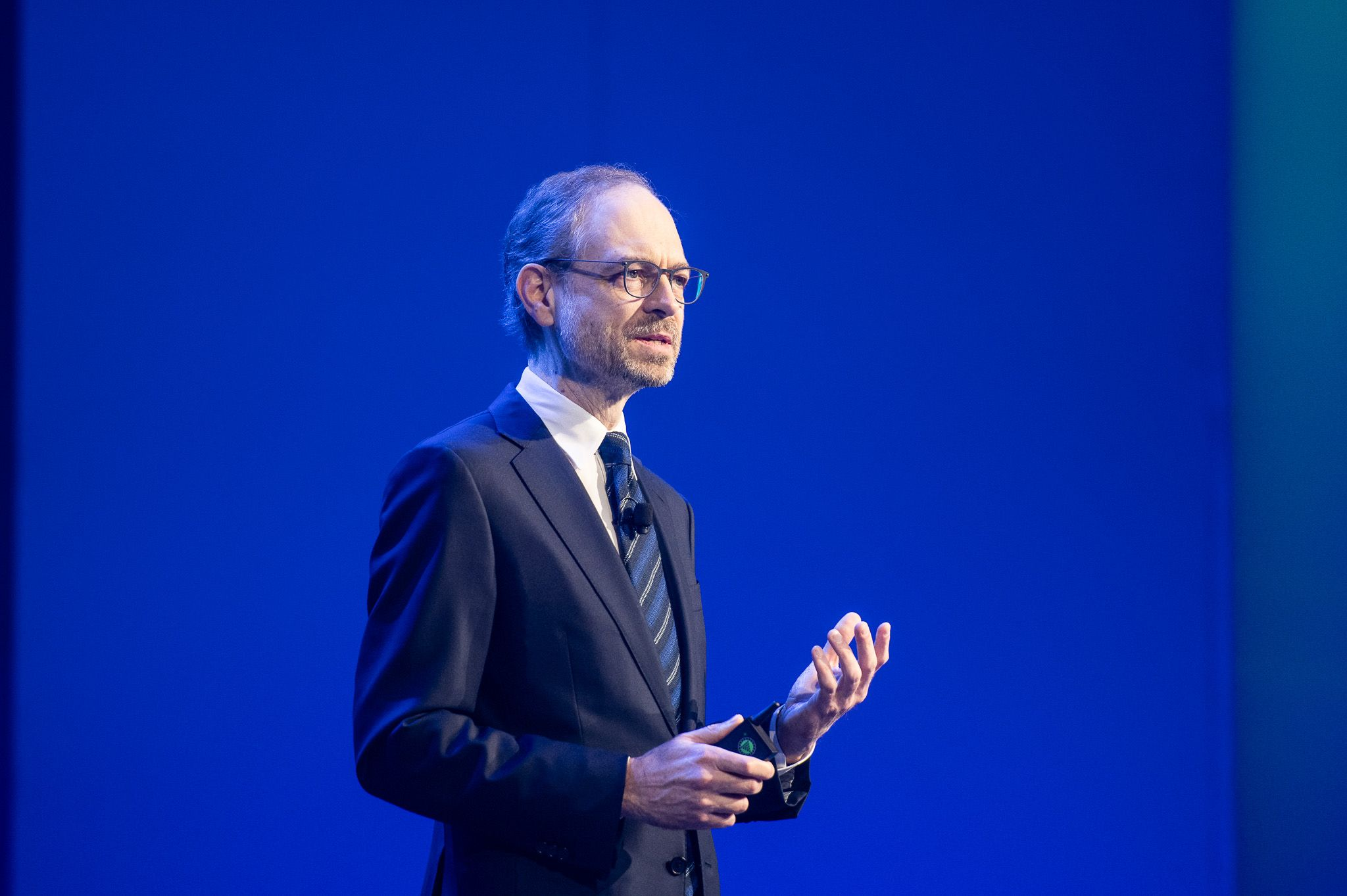
- Matt Calkins Appian World 2024 keynote speaker
- Title: Founder, CEO, Chairman and President of Appian Corporation Board game creator
- Board member of: Appian Corporation, Northern Virginia Technology Council (NVTC), Sorensen Institute and Virginia Public Access Project Council

Matt Calkins is the co-founder, CEO, chairman, and president of Appian Corporation, and a world champion board gamer.

== Early life and career ==
Calkins grew up in Mill Valley, California. He graduated from Dartmouth College in 1994 with a degree in economics. He then joined MicroStrategy, a business software vendor where he was the director of the Enterprise Product Group. When he was 26, he left MicroStrategy and co-founded Appian.

In 1999, Calkins co-founded Appian and began building software tools such as an intranet portal for the U.S. Army. In 2008, the company raised $8 million, and in 2014, raised $36 million in a secondary offering led by venture capital firm New Enterprise Associates. Appian later went public in May 2017. As of 2019, Calkins owns just under half of the company which is valued at $2.1 billion. Calkins believes there are different dimensions of AI.

== Appian ==
Calkins left MicroStrategy in 1999 in order to launch Appian Corporation. He was 26 years old. Appian creates low-code software that helps businesses build apps more quickly. It is used by government agencies including the United States Food and Drug Administration, and private companies such as T-Mobile, Bayer, and Exelon Corp. The company went public in 2017 and Calkins owns just under half of it.

== Board gamer ==
Calkins is well known for designing board games and playing competitively. He has collected 1,000 games, and has won a number of events at the World Boardgaming Championships. His philosophy is that business and gaming have a lot of similarities: business skills can make someone a better game player, and playing games helps to make him a better CEO.

Calkins created the board games Sekigahara, Tin Goose, Charioteer, and Magnet.

- Sekigahara: players recreate the 1600 Battle of Sekigahara in Japan
- Tin Goose: players build one of the first commercial airlines
- Charioteer: a strategic racing game set in ancient Rome
- Magnet: an “abstract game where players try to get their king to the middle of the board” [8] (runner-up for Games Magazine's Abstract Game of the Year, 2010)

Calkins has contributed to The New York Times about the value of board games in business.

== Other involvement ==
In 2017, Calkins was named to the Northern Virginia Technology Council (NVTC) board of directors. He also serves on the leadership council of the Virginia Public Access Project and the board of the Sorensen Institute. He was previously on the board for the NVTC TechPAC. Calkins was named to the 2022 Virginia 500: Federal Contractors - Technology.

== Political views ==
Calkins is a supporter of Elon Musk's involvement with the Department of Government Efficiency, but has criticized its implementation, saying: "it wasn’t nearly as much as we needed, and we probably didn’t need the chain saw. We needed the chisel."

=== War against Ukraine ===
Calkins helped the Renew Democracy Initiative to create fight4ukraine.com, a website that tracks the world's response to Russia's February 2022 invasion of Ukraine. This initiative included banning the sale of software to Russia.
