= Peter Darbee =

American executive (born 1953)

Peter Darbee (born January 19, 1953) is a business leader and executive. He has worked on climate change issues and supported carbon legislation.

== Biography ==
=== Education ===
Darbee graduated from Buckley Country Day School in Roslyn, New York, in 1967, then from Friends Academy in Locust Valley, New York, in 1971. Darbee has a bachelor's degree in economics from Dartmouth College and an M.B.A. from the Amos Tuck School of Business at Dartmouth. He also completed the Nuclear Reactor Technology Program at the Massachusetts Institute of Technology.

=== PG&E ===
In 1999 Darbee joined PG&E as senior vice president and chief financial officer. He was in charge of the “design and execution of the financial restructuring of Pacific Gas and Electric Company.” On January 1, 2005, he was promoted to CEO to “lead [the firm’s] efforts to fight climate change and promote clean energy.” He was also described as being “one of the first in a new breed of utility executives, and one of the last of the old guard.” He was a “self-professed conservative and no great friend to progressive causes.”

Given this, landing this leadership role at the firm was a surprise to him. He explained: "If you had asked me five years ago, this wouldn't have occurred to me. Somewhere in this process [of becoming CEO], I developed a point of view. That point of view, specifically, is this: ‘The Earth is warming. Mankind appears to be responsible. The need to take action is now.’"

While Darbee was at the helm, PG&E signed several contracts for “wind, solar and geothermal power, in an effort to achieve the state's renewable portfolio goals.” He also played a key role in bringing in top executives from firms including Intel.

He remained at the firm until 2011. Critics were said to have been surprised he “lasted this long [being] identified with a string of mistakes and bad decisions.” One example was the “rollout of millions of wireless SmartMeters” and the San Bruno blast, killing eight people and destroying 39 homes due to a deadly explosion of a major gas line, bad pipe condition, incomplete utility records, 1,800 miles of buried lines and inadequate handling of safety tests.

=== Other executive roles ===
As well as his leadership role at PG&E, Darbee was senior vice president, CFO, director and treasurer of Pacific Venture Capital I, L.P. and Pacific Venture Capital L.L.C. Other roles he has had include: VP and CFO of Advance Fibre Communications Inc., and VP, CFO and the controller of Pacific Bell. He was on the board of directors of PG&E National Energy Group Inc., a director of Pacific Gas and Electric Company, director of Gas Transmission Northwest LLC., VP and co general manager of the Energy & Telecom Group at Goldman Sachs, as well as a position at Salomon Brothers and AT&T.

=== After PG&E ===
After his PG&E resignation, Peter Darbee became a board member at Reel Solar. It was at this time that Reel Solar presented a regulatory filing confirming it had garnered $4 million in new funding.

== Board memberships ==
Darbee is a member of Friends for Harry Reid, the National Republican Congressional Committee, California Business Roundtable and the California Commission for Jobs and Economic Growth.
