= Jim Newton (journalist) =

American journalist, author, and educator

- Born: Palo Alto, California, U.S.
- Education: Dartmouth College
- Occupations: Journalist, author, educator
- Employer(s): University of California, Los Angeles (UCLA)
- Notable work: Justice for All: Earl Warren and the Nation He Made; Eisenhower: The White House Years; Man of Tomorrow: The Relentless Life of Jerry Brown; Worthy Fights: A Memoir of Leadership in War and Peace
- Awards: Carey McWilliams Award (2022)

Jim Newton is an American journalist, author, and educator. He is known for his contributions to journalism, political biography, and public policy discourse. Newton held several editorial roles at the Los Angeles Times. He covered significant events such as the 1992 Los Angeles riots and the 1994 Northridge earthquake, both of which were awarded Pulitzer Prizes for the paper's staff. He also served as a professor at the University of California, Los Angeles.

== Career in journalism ==
Newton was born in Palo Alto, California, and graduated from Dartmouth College. He began his journalism career at The New York Times, where he was the clerk to columnist James Reston in 1985–86. After spending a year on the Times foreign desk, he moved to The Atlanta Journal-Constitution, where he worked as a reporter for two years before joining the Los Angeles Times. Over more than 25 years at the Times, he served in various roles, including reporter, bureau chief, columnist, editor-at-large, and editor of the editorial pages.

Newton's work at the Los Angeles Times focused heavily on politics and governance, including state and national issues. He is a frequent contributor to various publications and a regular columnist for CalMatters, where he analyzes politics and government in Los Angeles for the Sacramento-based news organization.

== Academic career ==
In 2015 he joined the faculty at the University of California, Los Angeles (UCLA), where he has taught courses on journalistic ethics, writing, political history, and public policy. Newton is also the founding editor-in-chief of Blueprint, a policy-focused magazine affiliated with UCLA that examines issues of governance, equity, and policy innovation. The magazine was created in 2015 and publishes in print and online.

== Civic and advocacy roles ==
Newton is an advocate for journalistic integrity and freedom of speech. In 2012, he joined the board of directors of the First Amendment Coalition, a nonprofit organization dedicated to protecting free expression and government transparency. He has also served on the advisory boards of the Geffen Academy at UCLA and the California Policy Lab. In 2022, the American Political Science Association awarded Newton its Carey McWilliams Award, presented annually to a person or organization for "major journalistic contributions to society’s understanding of politics."

== Author ==
- Justice for All: Earl Warren and the Nation He Made (2006) – A biography of Chief Justice Earl Warren that examines his rise through California politics and his transformative impact on the Supreme court and the nation.
- Eisenhower: The White House Years (2011) – A detailed exploration of Dwight D. Eisenhower's presidency.
- Man of Tomorrow: The Relentless Life of Jerry Brown (2020) – A biography of California Governor Jerry Brown and modern California history.
- Worthy Fights: A Memoir of Leadership in War and Peace (2014) – Co-authored with Leon Panetta, this memoir details Panetta's career in public service.
