= Susan S. Huang =

Professor of Medicine

Susan S Huang is affiliated with the University of California, Irvine School of Medicine. She specializes in infection prevention.

Susan Huang is Professor of Medicine in the Division of Infectious Diseases and Medical Director of Epidemiology and Infection Prevention at the University of California, Irvine School of Medicine. She led clinical trials to assess effective methods of decolonization, including the widely cited REDUCE MRSA trial, published in The New England Journal of Medicine in 2013. Her work to advance the academic and practical knowledge of infection prevention has informed the Healthcare Infection Control Practices Advisory Committee, which advises on infection prevention and surveillance practices used throughout the U.S. health care system.

Huang and colleagues have found that taking certain hygiene steps reduces the risk of a dangerous MRSA infection of about a third. Such infections can cause complications with the heart, lungs, bones and skin, often resulting in patients having to return to hospital. Approximately five percent of hospitalized patients have MRSA, which increases their risk of developing full-blown infection once they have been discharged.

She earned degrees from Brown University (BA), Harvard School of Public Health (MPH), and Johns Hopkins University (MD).
