= Dick Levy =

Richard "Dick" Meyer Levy (born 1938) was the chief executive officer of Varian Medical Systems from 1999 to 2006 and was chairman of Varian Medical Systems' board of directors from 2002 until February 2014. Levy led the company during a period of rapid growth after it was spun off from Varian Inc. in 1999. Described as a "hands-on CEO", Levy was known to visit every one of his companies facilities, and he took steps to empower employees. Under his leadership, the company nearly tripled in size, and now dominates the medical radiation equipment market worldwide. Levy retired as CEO and was succeeded by Timothy E. Guertin in February 2006.

Levy has been described as a scientist and businessman of "remarkable vision and tenacious pragmatism" whose work led to the success of the Linac as a medical device, and to significant advances in radiation oncology. His "managerial astuteness" was an important element of Varian's commercial success in the medical field.

A native of Cincinnati, Ohio, Levy graduated from Dartmouth College in Hanover, New Hampshire, and received his Ph.D. in nuclear chemistry from the University of California at Berkeley, California. Married to Susan Lewis Levy since 1964, he began his employment with the Varian companies in 1968.

Levy's compensation in 2004 amounted to $9,540,851 and in 2005 it exceeded $19,320,000, making him one of Silicon Valley's wealthiest executives.

== Awards ==
A well-known philanthropist, Levy was given the 2010 David Packard Award for civic engagement by the Joint Venture Silicon Valley Network.

In 2003, Levy was an EY Entrepreneur of the Year Award Recipient for the Northern California Region.
