= Radiometer =

Device for measuring the radiant flux (power) of electromagnetic radiation

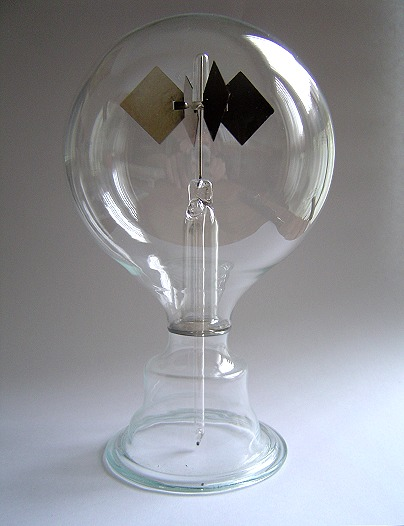
An example of a Crookes radiometer. The vanes rotate when exposed to light, with faster rotation for more intense light, providing a quantitative measurement of electromagnetic radiation intensity.

A radiometer is an instrument for measuring radiometric quantities such as radiant flux (power), irradiance, or radiance. Definitions typically limit radiometry to optical radiation, but some definitions include other kinds of electromagnetic radiation. Radiometers typically measure infrared radiation, visible radiation (light), ultraviolet radiation, or some combination of these.

Microwave radiometers operate in the microwave wavelengths. A roentgenometer is a radiometer for measuring the intensity of X-rays or gamma radiation.

While the term radiometer can refer to any device that measures electromagnetic radiation (e.g., light), the term is often used to refer specifically to a Crookes radiometer ("light-mill"), a device invented in 1873 in which a rotor (having vanes which are dark on one side, and light on the other) in a partial vacuum spins when exposed to light. A common misbelief (one originally held even by Crookes) is that the momentum of the absorbed light on the black faces makes the radiometer operate. If this were true, however, the radiometer would spin away from the non-black faces, since the photons bouncing off those faces impart more momentum than the photons absorbed on the black faces. Photons do exert radiation pressure on the faces, but those forces are dwarfed by other effects. The currently accepted explanation depends on having just the right degree of vacuum, and relates to the transfer of heat rather than the direct effect of photons.

A Nichols radiometer demonstrates photon pressure. It is much more sensitive than the Crookes radiometer and it operates in a complete vacuum, whereas operation of the Crookes radiometer requires an imperfect vacuum.

The MEMS radiometer can operate on the principles of Nichols or Crookes and can operate over a wide spectrum of wavelength and particle energy levels.

== See also ==
- Active cavity radiometer
- Bolometer
- Copernicus
- Net radiometer
- Photon rocket
- Pyranometer
- Radiation pressure
- Radiometry
- Solar sail
- Spectroradiometer
