= Chih-Tang Sah =

Chinese-American electronics engineer (born 1932)

- Born: November 10, 1932; Peiping, China
- Died: July 5, 2025 (aged 92)
- Education: Stanford University; University of Illinois at Urbana-Champaign
- Known for: Complementary metal–oxide–semiconductor
- Scientific career
- Fields: Engineering and Physics
- Workplaces: University of Illinois at Urbana-Champaign (1962-1988) University of Florida (1988-2010) Xiamen University (2010- )

Chih-Tang "Tom" Sah (simplified Chinese: 萨支唐; traditional Chinese: 薩支唐; pinyin: Sà Zhītáng; 10 November 1932 – 5 July 2025) was a Chinese-American electronics engineer and condensed matter physicist. He is best known for inventing CMOS (complementary MOS) logic with Frank Wanlass at Fairchild Semiconductor in 1963. CMOS is used in nearly all modern very large-scale integration (VLSI) semiconductor devices.

He was the Pittman Eminent Scholar and a Graduate Research Professor at the University of Florida from 1988 to 2010. He was a Professor of Physics and Professor of Electrical and Computer Engineering, emeritus, at the University of Illinois at Urbana-Champaign, where he taught for 26 years (1962-1988) and guided 40 students to the Ph.D. degree in electrical engineering and in physics and 34 MSEE theses. At the University of Florida, he guided 10 doctoral theses in EE. He has published more than 300 peer-reviewed journal articles with his graduate students and research associates, and presented about 200 invited lectures and 60 contributed papers in China, Europe, Japan, Taiwan and in the United States on transistor physics, technology and evolution.

== Biography ==
Sah is a member of the distinguished Fuzhou Sah Family, descendants of the prominent Yuan dynasty official Sadula, in Fuzhou, China. His father Pen-Tung Sah was a founding academician of the Academia Sinica of China (1928-1949) and served as president of Xiamen University (1937–1945) and Secretary General of the Academia Sinica (1945–1949). Sah also had a younger brother Chih-Han who was a mathematician and professor at the State University of New York at Stony Brook.

Sah received two Bachelor of Science (B.S.) degrees in 1953 in Electrical Engineering and Engineering Physics from the University of Illinois and the Master of Science (M.S.) and Doctor of Philosophy (Ph.D.) degrees from Stanford University in 1954 and 1956, respectively. His doctoral thesis research was on traveling-wave tubes under the tutelage of Karl Spangenberg.

His industrial career in solid-state electronics began with William Shockley in 1956 and continued at Fairchild Semiconductor Corporation in Palo Alto from 1959 to 1964 until he became a professor of physics and electrical engineering at the University of Illinois for 25 years (1962–1988). Under the management of Gordon E. Moore, Victor H. Grinich and Robert N. Noyce at Fairchild, Sah directed a 64-member Fairchild Physics Department on the development of the first generation manufacturing technologies (oxidation, diffusion, epitaxy growth, and metal conductor thin film deposition) for volume production of silicon bipolar and MOS transistors and integrated circuit technology including oxide masking for impurity diffusion, stable silicon (Si) MOS transistor, the CMOS circuit, origin of low-frequency noise, the MOS transistor model used in the first circuit simulator, thin film integrated resistance and the Si epitaxy process for bipolar integrated circuit production.

After the MOSFET (metal–oxide–semiconductor field-effect transistor, or MOS transistor) was first demonstrated by Mohamed Atalla and Dawon Kahng of Bell Labs in early 1960, Sah introduced MOS technology to Fairchild with his MOS-controlled tetrode fabricated in late 1960. In 1963, Sah invented the CMOS (complementary MOS) semiconductor device fabrication process with Frank Wanlass at Fairchild. CMOS is used in nearly all modern LSI and VLSI devices.

He was the founding editor (1991) of the International Series on the Advances in Solid State Electronics and Technology (ASSET) which has published three titles by invited authors (1990s) and eight monographs (2007–2013) by invited authors on compact modelling of devices for computer aided design of integrated circuits, all with the World Scientific Publishing Company, Singapore. His previous (1961–2013) research has been on MOS transistor models since he was drafted in October 2004 by his young colleagues to join them, after 40 years of absence subsequent to the 1964-Sah, 1965-Sah-Pao and 1966-Pao-Sah journal articles on MOS transistor models, in order to help further in the development of compact models for computer aided design of nanometer MOS integrated circuits. Since 2013, he has been studying condensed matter physics with his young colleague Bin Bin Jie, specifically water physics.

For contributions in transistor physics and technology, he received the Browder H. Thomson best paper Prize (IRE-1962) for an author under 30, the J. J. Ebers Award in Electron Devices (1981) and the Jack Morton Award (1989), all from the US Institute of Electrical and Electronics Engineers (IEEE), the Franklin Institute Certificate of Merit, the First Achievement Award in High Technology from the Asian-American Manufacturer Association in San Jose, CA (1984) (Co-recipient was Morris Chang), the Fourth Annual University Research Award of the Semiconductor Industry Association (1998), recipient in integrated circuit technology (Yung Cheng Fung in bioengineering) of the first Pioneer recognition Award of the Committee-of-100 (a Chinese-American citizen organization), the second annual Distinguished Lifetime Achievement Award of the Asian-American Engineer of the Year sponsored by the Chinese Institute of Engineering/USA (2003) and the Doctor Honoris Causa degree from the University of Leuven, Belgium (1975) and the Honorary Doctorate from Chiaotung University, Taiwan, R.O.C. (2004), and the National Honorary Doctorate of China (2010) nominated by Xiamen University. He was also the recipient of the celebrated member of the IEEE Electron Device Society (2012).

He was listed in a survey by the Institute for Scientific Information as one of the world's 1000 most cited scientists during 1963-1978. He was a Life Fellow of the American Physical Society, the Franklin Institute and the IEEE, a Fellow of the American Association for the Advancement of Science, a member of the U.S. National Academy of Engineering (1986), the Academia Sinica in Taipei (1998) and the Chinese Academy of Sciences in Beijing (2000). He was appointed an Honorary Professor of Tsinghua University (2003), Peking University (2003) and Xiamen University (2004) of China.

He wrote a three-volume textbook titled Fundamentals of Solid State Electronics (FSSE, 1991). FSSE was translated into Chinese in 2003.

=== Honors and awards ===
- 2012 – Celebrated Member of the IEEE Electron Device Society.
- 2010 – National Honorary Doctorate of China nominated by Xiamen University.
- 2004 – Honorary Doctorate, National Chiao-Tung University
- 2003 – Distinguished Lifetime Achievement Award, Chinese Institute of Engineers USA
- 2002 – Committee-100 Pioneer Recognition Award
- 2000 – Elected to the Chinese Academy of Sciences
- 1999 – Academician, Academia Sinica of Taipei
- 1999 – Semiconductor Industry Association University Research Award
- 1998 – University Research Award, U S Semiconductor Industry Association
- 1995 – Fellow, American Association of Advanced of Science
- 1995 – IEEE Life Fellow
- 1994 – Alumni Achievement Award, University of Illinois
- 1989 – IEEE Jack Morton Award
- 1986 – Elected a member of the National Academy of Engineering in 1986 for fundamental contributions leading to the characterization, development, and engineering of silicon diodes, transistors, and integrated circuits.
- 1981 – J. J. Ebers Award, IEEE Electron Device Society
- 1978 – 1000 World's Most Cited Scientists, 1965–1978, Institute for Scientific Information
- 1975 – Doctoris Honoris Causa, K. U. Leuven, Belgium
- 1975 – Franklin Institute Certificate of Merit
- 1971 – Fellow, American Physical Society
- 1969 – Fellow, Institute of Electrical & Electronic Engineers

=== Patents ===
- 3,204,160 – Surface Potential Controlled Semiconductor Device, August 1965
- 3,280,391 – High Frequency Transistor, October 1966
- 3,243,669 – Surface Potential Controlled Semiconductor Device, March 1969
- 4,343,962 – Oxide Charge Induced High Low Junction Emitter Solar Cell, with J. G. Fossum, S. C. Pao, F. A. Lindholm, 1982
- Patent Pending – DCIV Methodology for Rapid Determination of Reliability of Transistors.
