= Randal Bryant =

American computer scientist (born 1952)

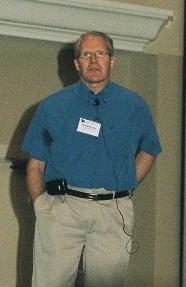
- Bryant in 2006
- Born: October 27, 1952 (age 73); United States
- Education: University of Michigan
- Known for: Binary Decision Diagrams (BDDs), formal hardware and software verification
- Parent: Barbara Everitt Bryant
- Relatives: William Littell Everitt (grandfather)
- Awards: Paris Kanellakis Theory and Practice Award; Phil Kaufman Award
- Scientific career
- Fields: Hardware, system software, networking
- Workplaces: School of Computer Science, Carnegie Mellon University

Randal E. Bryant (born October 27, 1952) is an American computer scientist and academic noted for his research on formally verifying digital hardware and software. Bryant has been a faculty member at Carnegie Mellon University since 1984. He served as the Dean of the School of Computer Science (SCS) at Carnegie Mellon from 2004 to 2014. Dr. Bryant retired and became a Founders University Professor Emeritus on June 30, 2020.

Bryant has received many recognitions for his research on hardware and software verification as well as algorithms and computer architecture. His 1986 paper on symbolic Boolean manipulation using Ordered Binary Decision Diagrams (BDDs) has the highest citation count of any publication in the Citeseer database of computer science literature. In 2009 Bryant was awarded the Phil Kaufman Award by the EDA Consortium "for his seminal technological breakthroughs in the area of formal verification."

== Early life and education ==
Bryant was born on October 27, 1952, and is the son of John H. Bryant and Barbara Everitt Bryant, and the grandson of William Littell Everitt, former dean of the electrical engineering department at the University of Illinois at Urbana–Champaign (1949–68). His sister is Lois Bryant, a textile artist. Bryant was raised in Birmingham, Michigan. Starting in 1970, he attended the University of Michigan, where he received his B.S. in applied mathematics in 1973. His master thesis on Simulation of Packet Communication Architecture Computer Systems, published in 1977, is known to be one of the first publications on distributed simulation. He received his PhD from the Massachusetts Institute of Technology department of electrical engineering and computer science in 1981.

== Career ==
- From 1981 to 1984, Bryant was assistant professor of computer science at California Institute of Technology. His research areas included VLSI circuit models, logic simulation, and circuit testing. He also taught courses in computer architecture, digital systems theory, and computer algorithms.
- In 1984, Bryant joined the faculty at Carnegie Mellon as an assistant professor of computer science. He continued his research on VLSI simulation, VLSI circuit verification, symbolic manipulation, and parallel computation.
- He was a visiting research fellow at Fujitsu Laboratories, Ltd. from 1990 to 1991.
- In 1992, he became the university professor at Carnegie Mellon. Bryant taught computer architecture from 1992 to 1997.
- He served as dean of the School of Computer Science at Carnegie Mellon University from 2004 to 2014. During his tenure, the combined enrollment at SCS increased more than 50 percent.
- In 2003, Bryant was elected a member of the National Academy of Engineering for contributions to symbolic simulation and logic verification.
- He was on the Engineering and Computer Science jury for the Infosys Prize from 2011 to 2013
- In 2014–2015, he was the Assistant Director for Information Technology Research and Development at the White House Office of Science and Technology Policy, where he did work on robotics, machine learning, high-performance computing, semiconductor technology, and cloud computing and provided analysis and advice on Big Data.
- Bryant is currently a professor at the School of Computer Science. His most recent research fields include formal hardware and software verification, system testing, and computer science education. He teaches the course 15-213: Introduction to Computer Systems with Professor David R. O'Hallaron. Their book Computer Systems: A Programmer's Perspective, which introduces students to the hardware, operating system, compiler, and computer networks, is used by over 300 universities worldwide.

== Research and publications ==
- Over the past years, Bryant has done much research on formal hardware and software verification as well as computer systems. His most well-known publication in 1986 was "Graph-Based Algorithms for Boolean Function Manipulation", in which binary decision diagram (BDDs) was presented as a novel data structure for representing Boolean functions and manipulation algorithms. BDDs has been used extensively in fields such as digital circuit testing and synthesis and artificial intelligence planning. According to the famous Computer Scientist Donald Knuth, BDDs was deemed as "one of the only really fundamental data structures that came out in the last twenty-five years". Following his research, he published another paper on a tutorial and update on BDDs in 1992. His paper on BDDs was awarded for having the highest citation count in the Citeseer database of any computer science literature.
- His work in verifying digital circuits-seminal work has received numerous awards from IEEE and other professional societies (see below). His paper on Formal verification by symbolic evaluation of partially-ordered trajectories was published in 1995. The method of symbolic trajectory evaluation described in his paper has been widely adopted to the industry, notably used by Intel. Starting in 2004, Bryant has been promoting new research initiatives in data-intensive computing.
- Bryant and Professor David R. O'Hallaron at Carnegie Mellon University together wrote the book "Computer Systems: A Programmer's Perspective," in which they take a novel approach on teaching computer systems. Rather than emphasizing the design and implementation of the systems, the book focuses on teaching students how systems - architecture, compilers, operating systems, and computer networking - affect the behavior and performance of the program. This book, now in its third edition, has been translated into Korean, Chinese, Macedonian and Russian and is in use by institutions all over the world.

== Awards and honors ==
- Bryant is a fellow of the IEEE and the ACM.
- He is a member of the National Academy of Engineering and the American Academy of Arts and Science.
- In 1998 he received the ACM Kanellakis Theory and Practice Award (along with Edmund M. Clarke, Ken McMillan, and Allen Emerson)
- In 1989, he was awarded the IEEE W.R.G. Baker Prize for the best paper appearing in any IEEE publication in the preceding year (1987).
- In 2007, Bryant received the IEEE Emmanuel R. Piore Award for his research on tools to verify semiconductor's designs prior to their manufacture.
- In 2009, Bryant was awarded the EDAC/IEEE Phil Kaufman for his "seminal technological breakthroughs in the area of formal verification".
- In 2010, he received the A. Richard Newton Technical Award in Electronic Design Automation.
