= Gordon Ferrie Hull =

Gordon Ferrie Hull (October 7, 1870 in Garnet, Ontario, Canada – October 7, 1956) was a Canadian-American mathematician, teacher and physicist, especially known for the experimental detection of the radiation pressure exerted by light which he achieved in 1903.

== Life ==
Hull began his career in 1890-1891 as a teacher of mathematics and science at Hamilton Collegiate Institute, Ontario.

He attended Toronto University where he obtained his bachelor's degree in 1892 and became a Fellow in physics, University of Toronto 1892-1895 .

Hull earned his 1897 doctorate of physics at the University of Chicago and was later a professor of physics there at Colby College. Thereafter (1899–1940), he taught physics at Dartmouth College. In addition, he had a research position at Cambridge University (1905–1906) and taught physics at Columbia University (1909–1915). As well as his academic career he was conscripted into the army in both World War I (1918–1919) and World War II (1941–1944) as major, in the United States Army Ordnance Department.

He married Wilhelmine Brandt on September 5, 1911. He had one son, Gordon Ferrie Hull, Jr.

He is especially famous for his 1903 experiment conducted with Ernest Fox Nichols in which they were the first to demonstrate the radiation pressure exerted by a beam of light. The apparatus is now known as the Nichols radiometer. Much of this apparatus is now in the Smithsonian, thanks to the generosity of Gordon F. Hull, Jr.

Hull died on October 7, 1956, his 86th birthday.

== Publications ==
- Survey of Modern Physics (1936)
- Elementary Modern Physics (1948)

== Bibliography ==
- Nichols, E. F.; Hull, GF (1903). About Radiation pressure. Annalen der Physik. pp. 225–263.
