= Crookes radiometer =

1873 device that rotates when exposed to light

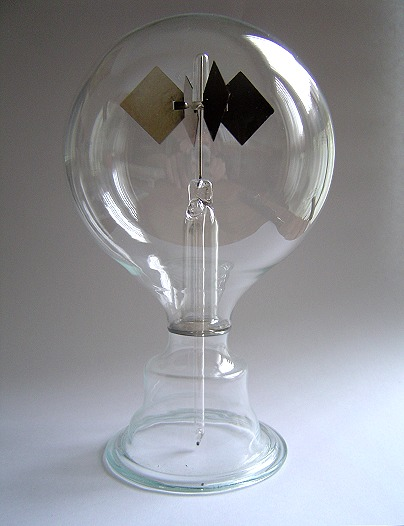
A Crookes radiometer

The Crookes radiometer (also known as a light mill) consists of an airtight glass bulb containing a partial vacuum, with a set of vanes which are mounted on a spindle inside. The vanes rotate when exposed to light, with faster rotation for more intense light, providing a quantitative measurement of electromagnetic radiation intensity.

The reason for the rotation was a cause of much scientific debate in the ten years following the invention of the device, but in 1879 the currently accepted explanation for the rotation was published. Today the device is mainly used in physics education as a demonstration of a heat engine run by light energy.

It was invented in 1873 by the chemist Sir William Crookes as the by-product of some chemical research. In the course of very accurate quantitative chemical work, he was weighing samples in a partially evacuated chamber to reduce the effect of air currents, and noticed the weighings were disturbed when sunlight shone on the balance. Investigating this effect, he created the device named after him.

It is still manufactured and sold as an educational aid or for curiosity.

== General description ==
A Crookes radiometer in action

The radiometer is made from a glass bulb from which much of the air has been removed to form a partial vacuum. Inside the bulb, on a low-friction spindle, is a rotor with several (usually four) vertical lightweight vanes spaced equally around the axis. The vanes are polished or white on one side and black on the other.

When exposed to sunlight, artificial light, or infrared radiation (even the heat of a hand nearby can be enough), the vanes turn with no apparent motive power, the dark sides retreating from the radiation source and the light sides advancing.

Cooling the outside of the radiometer rapidly causes rotation in the opposite direction.

=== Effect observations ===
The effect begins to be observed at partial vacuum pressures of several hundred pascals (or several torrs), reaches a peak at around 1 pascal (0.0075 torrs) and has disappeared by the time the vacuum reaches 1×10^{−4} pascals (7.5×10^{−7} torrs) (see explanations note 1). At these very high vacuums the effect of photon radiation pressure on the vanes can be observed in very sensitive apparatus (see Nichols radiometer), but this is insufficient to cause rotation.

=== Origin of the name ===
The prefix "radio-" in the title originates from the combining form of Latin radius, a ray: here it refers to electromagnetic radiation. A Crookes radiometer, consistent with the suffix "-meter" in its title, can provide a quantitative measurement of electromagnetic radiation intensity. This can be done, for example, by visual means (e.g., a spinning slotted disk, which functions as a simple stroboscope) without interfering with the measurement itself.

== Thermodynamic explanation ==
A Crookes radiometer in action with the light switched on and off. (Note that the explanation given in the caption to the clip does not agree with the modern explanation.)

=== Movement with absorption ===
When a radiant energy source is directed at a Crookes radiometer, the radiometer becomes a heat engine. The operation of a heat engine is based on a difference in temperature that is converted to a mechanical output. In this case, the black side of the vane becomes hotter than the other side, as radiant energy from a light source warms the black side by absorption faster than the silver or white side. The internal air molecules are heated up when they touch the black side of the vane. The warmer side of the vane is subjected to a force which moves it forward.

The internal temperature rises as the black vanes impart heat to the air molecules, but the molecules are cooled again when they touch the bulb's glass surface, which is at ambient temperature. This heat loss through the glass keeps the internal bulb temperature steady with the result that the two sides of the vanes develop a temperature difference. The white or silver side of the vanes are slightly warmer than the internal air temperature but cooler than the black side, as some heat conducts through the vane from the black side. The two sides of each vane must be thermally insulated to some degree so that the polished or white side does not immediately reach the temperature of the black side. If the vanes are made of metal, then the black or white paint can be the insulation. The glass stays much closer to ambient temperature than the temperature reached by the black side of the vanes. The external air helps conduct heat away from the glass.

The air pressure inside the bulb needs to strike a balance between too low and too high. A strong vacuum inside the bulb does not permit motion, because there are not enough air molecules to cause the air currents that propel the vanes and transfer heat to the outside before both sides of each vane reach thermal equilibrium by heat conduction through the vane material. High inside pressure inhibits motion because the temperature differences are not enough to push the vanes through the higher concentration of air: there is too much air resistance for "eddy currents" to occur, and any slight air movement caused by the temperature difference is damped by the higher pressure before the currents can "wrap around" to the other side.

=== Movement with radiation ===
When the radiometer is heated in the absence of a light source, it turns in the forward direction (i.e. black sides trailing). If a person's hands are placed around the glass without touching it, the vanes will turn slowly or not at all, but if the glass is touched to warm it quickly, they will turn more noticeably. Directly heated glass gives off enough infrared radiation to turn the vanes, but glass blocks much of the far-infrared radiation from a source of warmth not in contact with it. However, near-infrared and visible light more easily penetrate the glass.

If the glass is cooled quickly in the absence of a strong light source by putting ice on the glass or placing it in the freezer with the door almost closed, it turns backwards (i.e. the silver sides trail). This demonstrates radiation from the black sides of the vanes rather than absorption. The wheel turns backwards because the net exchange of heat between the black sides and the environment initially cools the black sides faster than the white sides. Upon reaching equilibrium, typically after a minute or two, reverse rotation ceases. This contrasts with sunlight, with which forward rotation can be maintained all day.

== Explanations for the force on the vanes ==
Over the years, there have been many attempts to explain how a Crookes radiometer works:

=== Incorrect theories ===
Crookes incorrectly suggested that the force was due to the pressure of light. This theory was originally supported by James Clerk Maxwell, who had predicted this force. This explanation is still often seen in leaflets packaged with the device. The first experiment to test this theory was done by Arthur Schuster in 1876, who observed that there was a force on the glass bulb of the Crookes radiometer that was in the opposite direction to the rotation of the vanes. This showed that the force turning the vanes was generated inside the radiometer. If light pressure were the cause of the rotation, then the better the vacuum in the bulb, the less air resistance to movement, and the faster the vanes should spin. In 1901, with a better vacuum pump, Pyotr Lebedev showed that, in fact, the radiometer only works when there is low-pressure gas in the bulb, and the vanes stay motionless in a hard vacuum. Finally, if light pressure were the motive force, the radiometer would spin in the opposite direction, as the photons on the shiny side being reflected would deposit more momentum than on the black side, where the photons are absorbed. This results from conservation of momentum – the momentum of the reflected photon exiting on the light side must be matched by a reaction on the vane that reflected it. The actual pressure exerted by light is far too small to move these vanes, but can be measured with devices such as the Nichols radiometer. It is in fact possible to make the radiometer spin in the opposite direction by either heating it or putting it in a cold environment (like a freezer) in absence of light, when black sides become cooler than the white ones due to the thermal radiation.

Another incorrect theory was that the heat on the dark side was causing the material to outgas, which pushed the radiometer around. This was later effectively disproved by both Schuster's experiments (1876) and Lebedev's (1901)

=== Partially correct theory ===
A partial explanation is that gas molecules hitting the warmer side of the vane will pick up some of the heat, bouncing off the vane with increased speed. Giving the molecule this extra boost effectively means that a minute pressure is exerted on the vane. The imbalance of this effect between the warmer black side and the cooler silver side means the net pressure on the vane is equivalent to a push on the black side and as a result the vanes spin round with the black side trailing. The problem with this idea is that while the faster moving molecules produce more force, they also do a better job of stopping other molecules from reaching the vane, so the net force on the vane should be the same. The greater temperature causes a decrease in local density which results in the same force on both sides. Years after this explanation was dismissed, Albert Einstein showed that the two pressures do not cancel out exactly at the edges of the vanes because of the temperature difference there. The force predicted by Einstein would be enough to move the vanes, but not fast enough.

=== Currently accepted theory ===
The currently accepted theory was formulated by Osborne Reynolds, who theorized that thermal transpiration was the cause of the motion. Reynolds found that if a porous plate is kept hotter on one side than the other, the interactions between gas molecules and the plates are such that gas will flow through from the cooler to the hotter side. The vanes of a typical Crookes radiometer are not porous, but the space past their edges behaves like the pores in Reynolds's plate. As gas moves from the cooler to the hotter side, the pressure on the hotter side increases. When the plate is fixed, the pressure on the hotter side increases until the ratio of pressures between the sides equals the square root of the ratio of absolute temperatures. Because the plates in a radiometer are not fixed, the pressure difference from cooler to hotter side causes the vane to move. The cooler (white) side moves forward, pushed by the higher pressure behind it. From a molecular point of view, the vane moves due to the tangential force of the rarefied gas colliding differently with the edges of the vane between the hot and cold sides.

The Reynolds paper went unpublished for a while because it was refereed by Maxwell, who then published a paper of his own, which contained a critique of the mathematics in Reynolds's unpublished paper. Maxwell died that year and the Royal Society refused to publish Reynolds's critique of Maxwell's rebuttal to Reynolds's unpublished paper, as it was felt that this would be an inappropriate argument when one of the people involved had already died.

== All-black light mill ==
To rotate, a light mill does not have to be coated with different colors across each vane. In 2009, researchers at the University of Texas, Austin created a monocolored light mill which has four curved vanes; each vane forms a convex and a concave surface. The light mill is uniformly coated by gold nanocrystals, which are a strong light absorber. Upon exposure, due to geometric effect, the convex side of the vane receives more photon energy than the concave side does, and subsequently the gas molecules receive more heat from the convex side than from the concave side. At rough vacuum, this asymmetric heating effect generates a net gas movement across each vane, from the concave side to the convex side, as shown by the researchers' direct simulation Monte Carlo modeling. The gas movement causes the light mill to rotate with the concave side moving forward, due to Newton's third law. This monocolored design promotes the fabrication of micrometer- or nanometer-scaled light mills, as it is difficult to pattern materials of distinct optical properties within a very narrow, three-dimensional space.

== Horizontal vane light mill ==
The thermal creep from the hot side of a vane to the cold side has been demonstrated in a mill with horizontal vanes that have a two-tone surface with a black half and a white half. This design is called a Hettner radiometer. This radiometer's angular speed was found to be limited by the behavior of the drag force due to the gas in the vessel more than by the behavior of the thermal creep force. This design does not experience the Einstein effect because the faces are parallel to the temperature gradient.

== Nanoscale light mill ==
In 2010 researchers at the University of California, Berkeley, succeeded in building a nanoscale light mill that works on an entirely different principle to the Crookes radiometer. A gold light mill, only 100 nanometers in diameter, was built and illuminated by laser light that had been tuned. The possibility of doing this had been suggested by the Princeton physicist Richard Beth in 1936. The torque was greatly enhanced by the resonant coupling of the incident light to plasmonic waves in the gold structure.

== Practical applications ==
The radiometric effect has not been often used for practical applications. Marcel Bétrisey made in 2001 two different clocks (Le Chronolithe and Conti) powered by the light. Their pendulums had bulb lamps located outside the glass dôme and pointing against 4 mica vanes. One meter pendulum gives one second, two lamps placed in either side light up alternately, thus "pushing" the 4 kilos pendulum each time. As there was vacuum inside, its accuracy was of the order of 2 seconds per month.

Radiometers are now commonly sold worldwide as a novelty ornament; needing no batteries, but only light to get the vanes to turn. They come in various forms, such as the one pictured, and are often used in science museums to illustrate "radiation pressure" – a scientific principle that they do not in fact demonstrate.

== See also ==
- Crookes tube
- Marangoni effect
- Nichols radiometer
- Photophoresis
- Solar energy
- Solar wind
- Thermophoresis
