= Karl Spangenberg =

American engineer, social scientist, academic, futurist, writer, and visionary

Karl Rudolph Spangenberg
- Education: Case Institute of Technology; Ohio State University
- Spouse: Ruth Fay Beahrs (m. 1943)
- Children: Kristin L. Spangenberg, Eric Karl Spangenberg, Karen Spangenberg, Karla Lane, Kathy Spangenberg, Rudy Spangenberg
- Scientific career
- Fields: Electrical engineering Sociocultural evolution
- Workplaces: Stanford University; Office of Naval Research; Instituto Technologica de Aeronautica
- Doctoral advisor: William Littell Everitt
- Doctoral students: Willis Harman; Robert Helliwell; Chih-Tang Sah

Karl Spangenberg was an American engineer, social scientist, academic, futurist, writer, and visionary.

== Affiliations ==
Spangenberg was a member of the American Physical Society and became an IRE (now IEEE) Associate in 1934, Senior Member in 1945, and a Fellow in 1949.

== Publications ==
Spangenberg authored "Vacuum Tubes" (1948) and "Fundamentals of Electron Devices" and edited "Electromagnetics in Space: Antenna Considerations as Related to Space Communications" (1965).

== Education ==
He received the B.S. and the M.S. degree in electrical engineering from Case Institute of Technology, in 1932 and 1933, respectively, and the Ph.D. degree from Ohio State University, Columbus, in 1937.

His PhD adviser was William Littell Everitt, a founding member of the National Academy of Engineering.

== Career ==
Spangenberg spent decades teaching in the Electrical Engineering Department of Stanford University in California.

He was an adviser of numerous outstanding scientists in Stanford University including Willis Harman, Robert Helliwell, and Chih-Tang Sah.

In the European Theater during World War II he was Head of the Electronics Division of the Office of Naval Research, 1948 to 1948.

Head of the Electronic Engineering Department of the Instituto Technologica de Aeronautica in the state of Sao Paulo, Brazil, 1952 to 1954.

By the early 1960s, Spangenberg was a consultant on engineering management and education to various companies, mostly in the San Francisco Bay area.

== Honors ==
Spangenberg Theater in Palo Alto was named in his honor.
