= Frank Wanlass =

American electrical engineer

Frank Marion Wanlass
- Born: 17 May 1933; Thatcher, AZ
- Died: 9 September 2010 (aged 77); Santa Clara, California
- Education: University of Utah
- Known for: Complementary metal–oxide–semiconductor
- Scientific career
- Fields: Engineering and Physics

Frank Marion Wanlass (May 17, 1933, in Thatcher, AZ – September 9, 2010, in Santa Clara, California) was an American electrical engineer. He is best known for inventing, along with Chih-Tang Sah, CMOS (complementary MOS) logic in 1963. CMOS has since become the standard semiconductor device fabrication process for MOSFETs (metal–oxide–semiconductor field-effect transistors).

== Biography ==
He obtained his PhD from the University of Utah. Wanlass invented CMOS (complementary MOS) logic circuits with Chih-Tang Sah in 1963, while working at Fairchild Semiconductor. Wanlass was given U.S. patent #3,356,858 for "Low Stand-By Power Complementary Field Effect Circuitry" in 1967.

In 1963, while studying MOSFET (metal–oxide–semiconductor field-effect transistor) structures, he noted the movement of charge through oxide onto a gate. While he did not pursue it, this idea would later become the basis for EPROM (erasable programmable read-only memory) technology.

In 1964, Wanlass moved to General Micro-electronics (GMe), where he made the first commercial MOS integrated circuits, and a year later to General Instrument Microelectronics Division in New York, where he developed four-phase logic.

He was also remembered for his contribution to solving threshold voltage stability in MOS transistors due to sodium ion drift.

In 1991, Wanlass was awarded the IEEE Solid-State Circuits Award.

In 2009, on the 50th anniversary of both the MOSFET and the integrated circuit, Frank Wanlass was inducted into the National Inventors Hall of Fame for his invention of CMOS logic. He was part of the 2009 class celebrating semiconductor pioneers, along with inventors of semiconductor technologies such as the MOSFET (Mohamed Atalla and Dawon Kahng), planar process (Jean Hoerni), EPROM (Dov Frohman) and molecular-beam epitaxy (Alfred Y. Cho).

Wanlass died on 9 September 2010.
