= Barbara Everitt Bryant =

American census director (1926–2023)

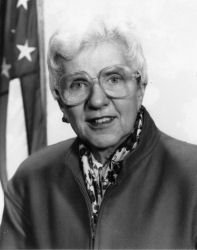

18th Director of the U.S. Census Bureau
- In office 1989–1993
- President: George H. W. Bush
- Preceded by: John G. Keane
- Succeeded by: Martha Farnsworth Riche

Personal details
- Born: Barbara Everitt; April 5, 1926 Ann Arbor, Michigan, U.S.
- Died: March 3, 2023 (aged 96) Ann Arbor, Michigan, U.S.
- Spouse: John H. Bryant (m. 1948; died 1997)
- Children: 3, including Randal
- Parent: William Littell Everitt
- Education: Cornell University; Michigan State University

Barbara Everitt Bryant (née Everitt; April 5, 1926 – March 3, 2023) was an American market researcher who became the first woman to head the United States Census Bureau. She directed the bureau from 1989 to 1993, including leading the 1990 United States census, and later also directed the American Customer Satisfaction Index.

== Early life and career ==
Barbara Everitt was born in Ann Arbor, Michigan. Her father, William Littell Everitt, was an electrical engineer and educator. She graduated high school as valedictorian, and did her undergraduate studies at Cornell University in physics, graduating in 1947. Her intent after studying physics was to become a science writer, and after graduating she worked in New York City as an editor of Chemical Engineering magazine. However she left to follow her husband, electrical engineer John H. Bryant, to the University of Illinois, where he was a graduate student. She did some more science writing there but stopped to become a full-time mother.

After her children had all entered school, she returned to work at the continuing education division of Michigan State University (Oakland), later to split off as Oakland University. She returned to graduate studies at Michigan State, earning a master's degree in journalism in 1967 and a Doctor of Philosophy in communications in 1970. She worked in market research at Market Opinion Research from then until 1989, and served on the Census Advisory Committee from 1980 to 1986.

== Census director ==
The president of Market Opinion Research, Robert Teeter, had worked on the presidential campaign and transition team of George H. W. Bush. In 1989, after Bush's first choice of Alan Heslop was blocked, he made a recess appointment that put Bryant in charge of the Census Bureau, the first woman to hold the post. She was eventually confirmed for the office in August 1990.

Bryant listed her goals when she became director of the Census Bureau as completing the census accurately, improving its economic statistics, modernizing its computing infrastructure, strengthening its statistics directorate, computerizing its interview process, and preparing to modernize the census-taking process for the 2000 census. Later in her directorate, she incorporated ideas from total quality management into the institutional processes of the census.

The mechanisms of the 1990 census were largely already in place at the time of Bryant's appointment, and led to controversy concerning their undercounts of minorities. Bryant led and endorsed efforts to adjust the results and compensate for the undercount, but these adjustments were eventually rejected for political reasons by the secretary of commerce.

== Awards and honors ==
Bryant became a fellow of the American Statistical Association in 1998. She was the 2007 winner of the Warren E. Miller Award for Meritorious Service to the Social Sciences of the Inter-university Consortium for Political and Social Research.

== Later life ==
After leaving the Census in 1993, she took a position as a research scientist at the University of Michigan School of Business and as director of the American Customer Satisfaction Index.

Her husband died in 1997; they had three children: Linda, Randal, and Lois, and eight grandchildren. Bryant died on March 3, 2023, at age 96.

== Publications ==
With William Dunn, Bryant is the author of Moving Power and Money: The Politics of Census Taking (New Strategist Publications, 1995).
