= W. Dean Harman =

Walter Dean Harman
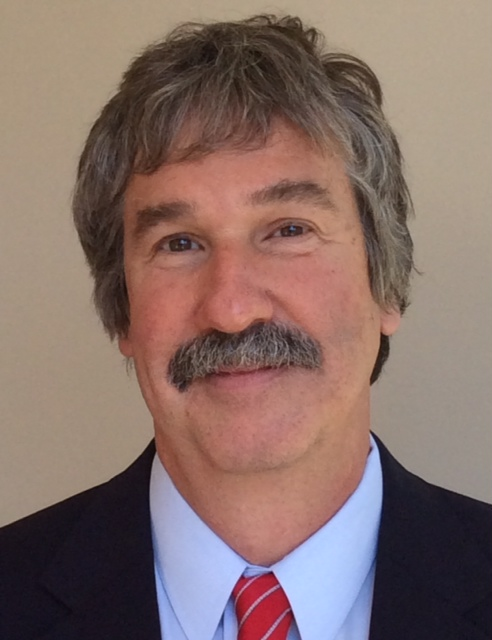
- Born: November 4, 1960 (age 66); Stanford, CA
- Occupations: Chemist, academic, author and researcher
- Awards: Camille and Henry Dreyfus Teacher-Scholar Award; NSF Young Investigator Award; Cavalier Distinguished Teaching Professor

Academic background
- Education: B.S., Chemistry; Ph. D., Chemistry
- Alma mater: Stanford University
- Thesis: The Reactivity of Pentaammineosmium(II) with Unsaturated Ligands (1987)

Academic work
- Institutions: University of Virginia

Walter (W.) Dean Harman is an American chemist, academic, author and researcher. He is the William R. Kenan, Jr. Professor of Chemistry at the University of Virginia.

Harman's research primarily focuses on organic, inorganic, and organometallic chemistry. He has also worked extensively in the area of dearomatization, and has developed new chemical tools based on tungsten, osmium, rhenium, and molybdenum that are designed to manipulate organic molecules in new ways. He is also the co-author of a textbook for general chemistry with Professor Gordon Yee, entitled Thinkwell Chemistry.

== Early life and education ==
Harman is the son of Willis Harman. He was born on November 4, 1960, in Stanford, California. He studied at Stanford University and received his bachelor's degree in chemistry in 1983, and a doctoral degree in chemistry in 1987. He then served there as a research associate with Henry Taube until 1989.

== Career ==
Harman held a brief appointment as an instructor at Stanford University before joining the University of Virginia as assistant professor of chemistry in 1989. He was promoted to associate professor in 1994, and became a full professor in the department of chemistry in 1997. He also held an administrative appointment in his career. From 2011 till 2019, he served as the chair of the department of chemistry at the University of Virginia. In 2023, he became the William R. Kenan, Jr. Professor of Chemistry.

== Research ==
Harman specializes in organic, inorganic, and organometallic chemistry. He focuses on the development of a new generation of dearomatization agents based on a matching of the d5/d6 reduction potential of rhenium(I), tungsten(0), and molybdenum(0) complexes with that of pentaammineosmium(II). He is the first to demonstrate the step by step conversion of benzene to cyclohexene with varying degrees of deuterium incorporation while binding to a tungsten complex. He also described the formation of stereoselectively deuterated building blocks for pharmaceutical research.

Harman prepared and explored a series of novel bridgehead CF_{3}-substituted isoquinuclidines from decomplexed dihydropyridines, and suggested that dihapto-coordinate complex can be isolated as a single diastereomer, methylated, and reacted with a number of nucleophiles. In 2017, he reviewed a series of his papers published between 2005 and 2017 that focused on the organic reactions of aromatic ligands η2-coordinated to tungsten, and the usage of these reactions in the synthesis of novel organic substances. Furthermore, in collaboration with Daniel Ess, he conducted experiments and directed dynamics simulations to investigate η2-arene/aryl hydride equilibria of tungsten benzene complexes in which the arene is held more loosely than in the ground state, primarily through dispersion forces.

== Awards and honors ==
- 1993 - NSF Young Investigator Award
- 1994 - Alfred P. Sloan Research Fellow
- 1997 - Cavalier Distinguished Teaching Professor
- 2004 - Undergraduate Research Network Faculty Award for Mentorship
- 2007 - Mead Honored Faculty
- 2008 - Distinguished Professor Award, Alumni Association

== Bibliography ==
=== Books ===
- Thinkwell Chemistry (2001) ISBN 0495105929

=== Selected articles ===
- Smith, J. A., Simpson, S. R., Westendorff, K. S., Weatherford-Pratt, J., Myers, J. T., Wilde, J. H., ... & Harman, W. D. (2020). η2 Coordination of Electron-Deficient Arenes with Group 6 Dearomatization Agents. Organometallics, 39(13), 2493–2510.
- Wilde, J. H., Dickie, D. A., & Harman, W. D. (2020). A Highly Divergent Synthesis of 3-Aminotetrahydropyridines. The Journal of organic chemistry, 85(12), 8245–8252.
- Smith, J. A., Wilson, K. B., Sonstrom, R. E., Kelleher, P. J., Welch, K. D., Pert, E. K., ... & Harman, W. D. (2020). Preparation of cyclohexene isotopologues and stereoisotopomers from benzene. Nature, 581(7808), 288–293.
- Wilde, J. H., Myers, J. T., Dickie, D. A., & Harman, W. D. (2020). Molybdenum-promoted dearomatization of pyridines. Organometallics, 39(8), 1288–1298.
- Myers, J. T., Wilde, J. H., Sabat, M., Dickie, D. A., & Harman, W. D. (2020). Michael–Michael Ring-Closure Reactions for a Dihapto-Coordinated Naphthalene Complex of Molybdenum. Organometallics, 39(8), 1404–1412.
