= Ernest Martin Hopkins =

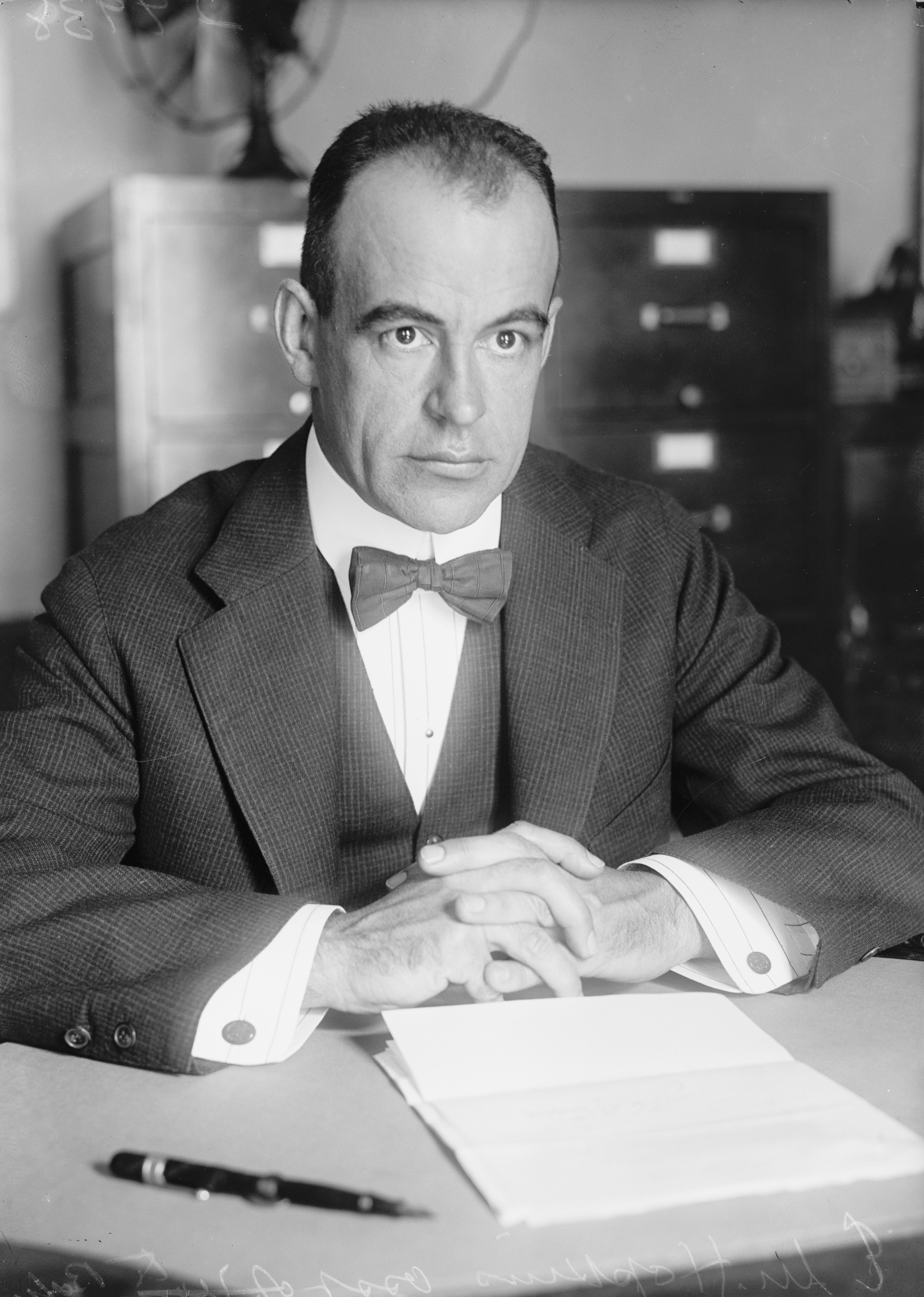

11th President of Dartmouth College
- In office 1916–1945
- Preceded by: Ernest Fox Nichols
- Succeeded by: John Sloan Dickey

Personal details
- Born: November 6, 1877; Dunbarton, New Hampshire
- Died: August 13, 1964 (aged 86); Manset, Maine
- Education: Worcester Academy; Dartmouth College (AB)

Ernest Martin Hopkins (November 6, 1877 – August 13, 1964) served as the 11th President of Dartmouth College from 1916 to 1945.

== Dartmouth Presidency ==
At the dedication of the Hopkins Center for the Arts in 1962, the speaker, then-Governor of New York Nelson A. Rockefeller, turned to the man for whom the building was named and said, "I came to Dartmouth because of you."

As a young man growing up in New Hampshire, he worked in a granite quarry and decided to attend Dartmouth for his undergraduate education over the stern objections of his father, who had attended Harvard and wanted his son to also attend Harvard. However, after graduating from Worcester Academy in 1896, Hopkins matriculated to Dartmouth. So strong were the impressions he made in Hanover during his student years that then-President William Jewett Tucker employed him as a clerk and supported him with a scholarship during the depression of the 1890s.

A Dartmouth graduate himself (class of 1901), Ernest Martin Hopkins did not fit the typical mold of a college president when he was selected by the Trustees in 1916. He was not an academic, had never held a teaching position and had spent the bulk of his career in the business world. But any doubts about his leadership qualities were quickly dispelled and he showed himself to be a champion of academic freedom in an era when that basic tenet of scholarship was under attack.

The administration of Ernest Martin Hopkins spanned two world wars, and he was called to serve his country on several occasions. In World War I, he was named Assistant Secretary of War for Industrial Relations and served in the Office of Production and Management at the outset of World War II. President Hopkins was the recipient of at least 15 honorary degrees, and, while president of Dartmouth, declined an invitation to serve as president of the University of Chicago in order, according to a 1964 obituary in The New York Times, "to continue development of his ideas of what an undergraduate liberal arts education should encompass." The articulation of these ideas during the Hopkins administration has become an enduring legacy that continues at Dartmouth today.
