= 1990 United States census =

21st United States national census

Twenty-first census of the United States
- April 1, 1990
- U.S. Census Bureau seal

General information
- Country: United States

Results
- Total population: 248,709,873 (▲9.8%)
- Most populous state: California; 29,760,021
- Least populous state: Wyoming; 453,588

The 1990 United States census, conducted by the Census Bureau, determined the resident population of the United States to be 248,709,873, an increase of 9.8 percent over the 226,545,805 persons enumerated during the 1980 census.

Approximately 16 percent of households received a "long form" of the 1990 census, which contained more than 100 questions. Full documentation on the 1990 census, including census forms and a procedural history, is available from the Integrated Public Use Microdata Series.

It was the first census to designate "Native Hawaiian and Other Pacific Islander" as a racial group separate from Asians. The census was also the first census to be directed by a woman, Barbara Everitt Bryant.

To increase black participation in the 1990 United States census, the bureau recruited Bill Cosby, Magic Johnson, Alfre Woodard, and Miss America Debbye Turner as spokespeople. Aggregate data for small areas, together with electronic boundary files, can be downloaded from the National Historical Geographic Information System. Personally identifiable information will be available in 2062.

This was the first census since 1880 in which Chicago was not the second-largest city, having been overtaken by Los Angeles. As of the 2020 census, Los Angeles has remained the nation's second-largest city. This was also the first census in which Wyoming was the least populous state.

== State rankings ==
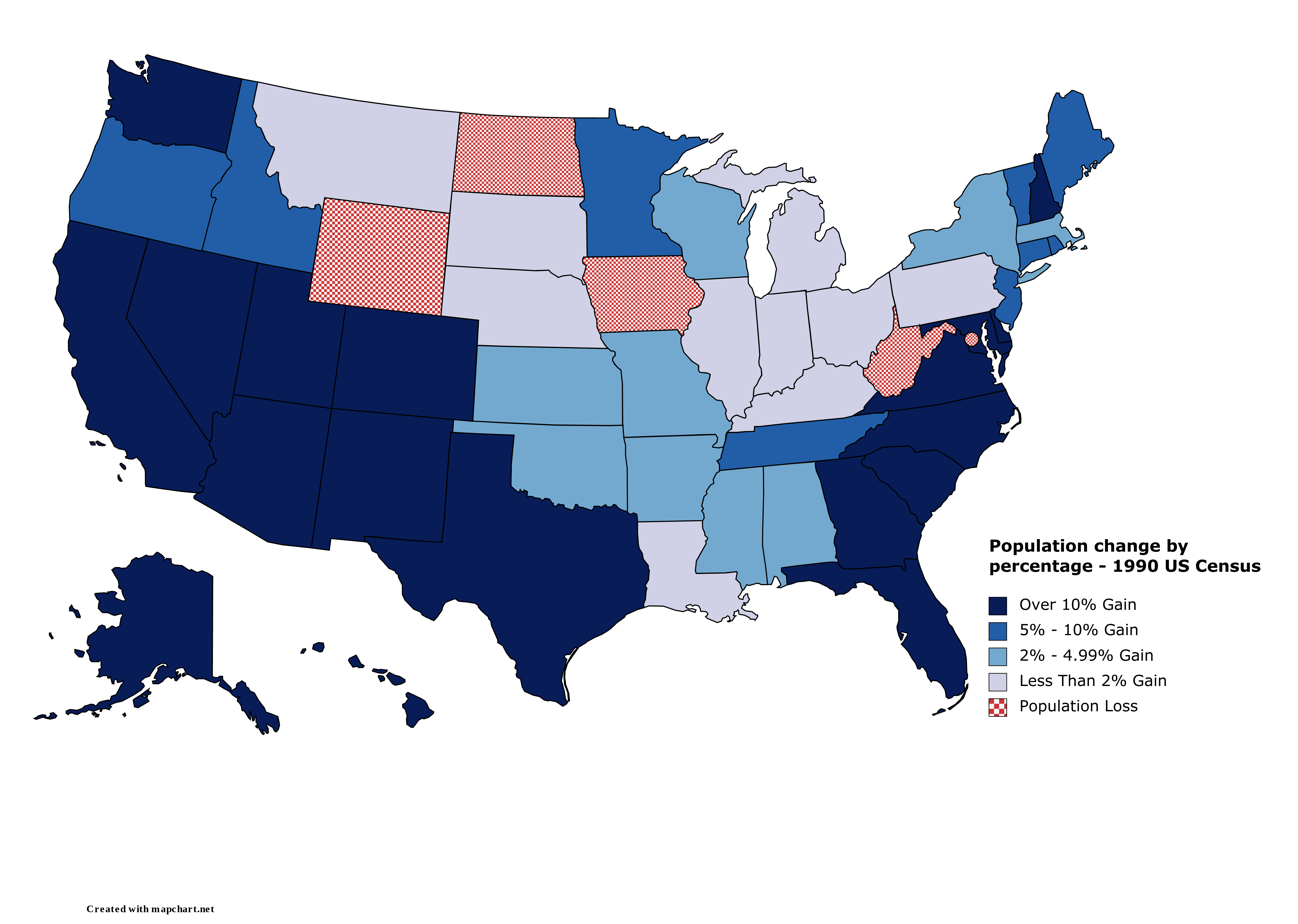
A map showing the population change of each US State by percentage.

Population and population change in the United States by state
Rank	State	Population as of 1990 census	Population as of 1980 census	Change	Percent change
1	California	29,760,021	23,667,902	▲6,092,119	▲25.7%
2	New York	17,990,455	17,558,072	▲432,383	▲2.5%
3	Texas	16,986,510	14,229,191	▲2,757,319	▲19.4%
4	Florida	12,937,926	9,746,324	▲3,191,602	▲32.7%
5	Pennsylvania	11,881,643	11,863,895	▲17,748	▲0.2%
6	Illinois	11,430,602	11,426,518	▲4,084	▲0.0%
7	Ohio	10,847,115	10,797,630	▲49,485	▲0.4%
8	Michigan	9,295,297	9,262,078	▲33,219	▲0.4%
9	New Jersey	7,730,188	7,364,823	▲365,365	▲5.0%
10	North Carolina	6,628,637	5,881,766	▲746,871	▲12.7%
11	Georgia	6,478,216	5,463,105	▲1,015,111	▲18.6%
12	Virginia	6,187,358	5,346,818	▲840,540	▲15.7%
13	Massachusetts	6,016,425	5,737,037	▲279,388	▲4.9%
14	Indiana	5,544,159	5,490,224	▲53,935	▲1.0%
15	Missouri	5,117,073	4,916,686	▲200,387	▲4.1%
16	Wisconsin	4,891,769	4,705,767	▲186,002	▲3.9%
17	Tennessee	4,877,185	4,591,120	▲286,065	▲6.2%
18	Washington	4,866,692	4,132,156	▲734,536	▲17.8%
19	Maryland	4,781,468	4,216,975	▲564,493	▲13.4%
20	Minnesota	4,375,099	4,075,970	▲299,129	▲7.3%
21	Louisiana	4,219,973	4,205,900	▲14,073	▲0.3%
22	Alabama	4,040,587	3,893,888	▲146,699	▲3.8%
23	Kentucky	3,685,296	3,660,777	▲24,519	▲0.7%
24	Arizona	3,665,228	2,718,215	▲947,013	▲34.8%
25	South Carolina	3,486,703	3,121,820	▲364,883	▲11.7%
26	Colorado	3,294,394	2,889,964	▲404,430	▲14.0%
27	Connecticut	3,287,116	3,107,576	▲179,540	▲5.8%
28	Oklahoma	3,145,585	3,025,290	▲120,295	▲4.0%
29	Oregon	2,842,321	2,633,105	▲209,216	▲7.9%
30	Iowa	2,776,755	2,913,808	▼ –137,053	▼ –4.7%
31	Mississippi	2,573,216	2,520,638	▲52,578	▲2.1%
32	Kansas	2,477,574	2,363,679	▲113,895	▲4.8%
33	Arkansas	2,350,725	2,286,435	▲64,290	▲2.8%
34	West Virginia	1,793,477	1,949,644	▼ –156,167	▼ –8.0%
35	Utah	1,722,850	1,461,037	▲261,813	▲17.9%
36	Nebraska	1,578,385	1,569,825	▲8,560	▲0.5%
37	New Mexico	1,515,069	1,302,894	▲212,175	▲16.3%
38	Maine	1,227,928	1,124,660	▲103,268	▲9.2%
39	Nevada	1,201,833	800,493	▲401,340	▲50.1%
40	New Hampshire	1,109,252	920,610	▲188,642	▲20.5%
41	Hawaii	1,108,229	964,691	▲143,538	▲14.8%
42	Idaho	1,006,749	943,935	▲62,814	▲6.7%
43	Rhode Island	1,003,464	947,154	▲56,310	▲5.9%
44	Montana	799,065	786,690	▲12,375	▲1.6%
45	South Dakota	696,004	690,768	▲5,236	▲0.8%
46	Delaware	666,168	594,338	▲71,830	▲12.1%
47	North Dakota	638,800	652,717	▼ –13,917	▼ –2.1%
—	District of Columbia	606,900	638,333	▼ –31,433	▼ –4.9%
48	Vermont	562,758	511,456	▲51,302	▲10.0%
49	Alaska	550,043	401,851	▲148,192	▲36.8%
50	Wyoming	453,588	469,557	▼ –15,969	▼ –3.4%
	United States	248,709,873	226,545,805	22,164,068	9.8%

== Reapportionment ==
The results of the 1990 census determined the number of seats that each state receives in the United States House of Representatives starting with the 1992 elections. Consequently, this affected the number of votes each state has in the Electoral College for the 1992 presidential election.

Because of population changes, twenty-one states had changes in their number of seats. Eight states gained at least one seat, and thirteen states lost at least one seat. The final result involved 19 seats being switched.

Gained seven seats	Gained four seats	Gained three seats	Gained one seat	Lost one seat	Lost two seats	Lost three seats
California	Florida	Texas	Arizona; Georgia; North Carolina; Virginia; Washington	Iowa; Kansas; Kentucky; Louisiana; Massachusetts; Montana; New Jersey; West Virginia	Illinois; Michigan; Ohio; Pennsylvania	New York

== City rankings ==
Rank	City	State	Population	Region (2016)
01	New York	New York	7,322,564	Northeast
02	Los Angeles	California	3,485,398	West
03	Chicago	Illinois	2,783,726	Midwest
04	Houston	Texas	1,630,553	South
05	Philadelphia	Pennsylvania	1,585,577	Northeast
06	San Diego	California	1,110,549	West
07	Detroit	Michigan	1,027,974	Midwest
08	Dallas	Texas	1,006,877	South
09	Phoenix	Arizona	983,403	West
10	San Antonio	Texas	935,933	South
11	San Jose	California	782,248	West
12	Baltimore	Maryland	736,014	South
13	Indianapolis	Indiana	731,327	Midwest
14	San Francisco	California	723,959	West
15	Jacksonville	Florida	635,230	South
16	Columbus	Ohio	632,910	Midwest
17	Milwaukee	Wisconsin	628,088	Midwest
18	Memphis	Tennessee	610,337	South
19	Washington	District of Columbia	606,900	South
20	Boston	Massachusetts	574,283	Northeast
21	Seattle	Washington	516,259	West
22	El Paso	Texas	515,342	South
23	Cleveland	Ohio	505,616	Midwest
24	New Orleans	Louisiana	496,938	South
25	Nashville-Davidson	Tennessee	488,374	South
26	Denver	Colorado	467,610	West
27	Austin	Texas	465,622	South
28	Fort Worth	Texas	447,619	South
29	Oklahoma City	Oklahoma	444,719	South
30	Portland	Oregon	437,319	West
31	Kansas City	Missouri	435,146	Midwest
32	Long Beach	California	429,433	West
33	Tucson	Arizona	405,390	West
34	St. Louis	Missouri	396,685	Midwest
35	Charlotte	North Carolina	395,934	South
36	Atlanta	Georgia	394,017	South
37	Virginia Beach	Virginia	393,069	South
38	Albuquerque	New Mexico	384,736	West
39	Oakland	California	372,242	West
40	Pittsburgh	Pennsylvania	369,879	Northeast
41	Sacramento	California	369,365	West
42	Minneapolis	Minnesota	368,383	Midwest
43	Tulsa	Oklahoma	367,302	South
44	Honolulu	Hawaii	365,272	West
45	Cincinnati	Ohio	364,040	Midwest
46	Miami	Florida	358,548	South
47	Fresno	California	354,202	West
48	Omaha	Nebraska	335,795	Midwest
49	Toledo	Ohio	332,943	Midwest
50	Buffalo	New York	328,123	Northeast
51	Wichita	Kansas	304,011	Midwest
52	Santa Ana	California	293,742	West
53	Mesa	Arizona	288,091	West
54	Colorado Springs	Colorado	281,140	West
55	Tampa	Florida	280,015	South
56	Newark	New Jersey	275,221	Northeast
57	Saint Paul	Minnesota	272,235	Midwest
58	Louisville	Kentucky	269,063	South
59	Anaheim	California	266,406	West
60	Birmingham	Alabama	265,968	South
61	Arlington	Texas	261,721	South
62	Norfolk	Virginia	261,229	South
63	Las Vegas	Nevada	258,295	West
64	Corpus Christi	Texas	257,453	South
65	St. Petersburg	Florida	238,629	South
66	Rochester	New York	231,636	Northeast
67	Jersey City	New Jersey	228,537	Northeast
68	Riverside	California	226,505	West
69	Anchorage	Alaska	226,338	West
70	Lexington-Fayette	Kentucky	225,366	South
71	Akron	Ohio	223,019	Midwest
72	Aurora	Colorado	222,103	West
73	Baton Rouge	Louisiana	219,531	South
74	Stockton	California	210,943	West
75	Raleigh	North Carolina	207,951	South
76	Richmond	Virginia	203,056	South
77	Shreveport	Louisiana	198,525	South
78	Jackson	Mississippi	196,637	South
79	Mobile	Alabama	196,278	South
80	Des Moines	Iowa	193,187	Midwest
81	Lincoln	Nebraska	191,972	Midwest
82	Madison	Wisconsin	191,262	Midwest
83	Grand Rapids	Michigan	189,126	Midwest
84	Yonkers	New York	188,082	Northeast
85	Hialeah	Florida	188,004	South
86	Montgomery	Alabama	187,106	South
87	Lubbock	Texas	186,206	South
88	Greensboro	North Carolina	183,521	South
89	Dayton	Ohio	182,044	Midwest
90	Huntington Beach	California	181,519	West
91	Garland	Texas	180,650	South
92	Glendale	California	180,038	West
93	Columbus	Georgia	178,681	South
94	Spokane	Washington	177,196	West
95	Tacoma	Washington	176,664	West
96	Little Rock	Arkansas	175,795	South
97	Bakersfield	California	174,820	West
98	Fremont	California	173,339	West
99	Fort Wayne	Indiana	173,072	Midwest
100	Arlington	Virginia	170,936	South

== Locations of 50 most populous cities ==
Location of 50 largest cities by population in the United States in 1990
