= Frederic Columbus Blake =

American engineer, social scientist, academic, futurist, writer, and visionary

Frederic C. Blake
- Education: Columbia University
- Scientific career
- Fields: Electrical engineering Sociocultural evolution
- Workplaces: Ohio State University
- Doctoral advisor: Ernest Fox Nichols
- Doctoral students: William Littell Everitt

Frederic Columbus Blake (born October 30, 1877 in Decatur, Illinois) was an American engineer, social scientist, academic, futurist, writer, and visionary. He was adviser of numerous outstanding scientists in Ohio State University including William Littell Everitt. His PhD adviser was Ernest Fox Nichols, a President of Dartmouth College.
