= Martha Farnsworth Riche =

American economist (born 1939)

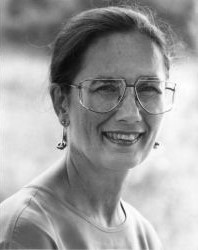
- Riche c. 1989

19th Director of the U.S. Census Bureau
- In office 1994–1998
- President: Bill Clinton
- Preceded by: Barbara Everitt Bryant
- Succeeded by: Kenneth Prewitt

Personal details
- Born: October 16, 1939 (age 87) Ann Arbor, Michigan, U.S.
- Education: University of Michigan; Georgetown University

Martha Farnsworth Riche (/ˈrɪtʃi/ RITCH-ee; born October 16, 1939) is an American economist who directed the United States Census Bureau from 1994 to 1998.

== Early life and pre-census career ==
Riche was born in Ann Arbor, Michigan. She studied labor economics at the University of Michigan, where she earned a bachelor's degree in economics in 1960. She stayed at Michigan for another year, earning a master's degree in 1961. Being female made her unable to obtain interviews at the banking firms she had been aiming for, so instead she worked on productivity statistics at the Bureau of Labor Statistics from 1961 to 1976.

In 1976, she married an economist at Cornell University, and left Washington to move to Ithaca, New York. In 1977, she completed a Ph.D. in French literature at Georgetown University. She writes that the subject is more strongly connected to her census work than it would seem, through "narrative structure" and "the story the data tell".

For the next 13 years, from 1978 to 1991, she worked at American Demographics magazine, where she was one of the founding editors. She also became editor of another publication, The Numbers News, where she documented numerical trends such as the declining proportion of white men in the American population. In 1983, her husband, then working at the Federal Trade Commission, was killed in a home invasion robbery in Alexandria, Virginia; Riche was shot as well, and ran screaming and bloodied to the house of a neighbor. She survived the shooting, and returned to Ithaca. In 1991 she became director of policy studies at the Population Reference Bureau, a non-profit organization in Washington, D.C.

== Census ==
Riche was appointed by Bill Clinton as director of the census in October 1994 and continued there until her resignation in January 1998. While she was census director, Riche was elected as a Fellow of the American Statistical Association in 1995.

One of her priorities as census director was the replacement of the Standard Industrial Classification, which she had used at the Bureau of Labor Statistics, by the North American Industry Classification System. Although she cited only personal reasons in her resignation, it was seen as a sign that Congressional Republicans were winning in their fight to prevent the Census Bureau from using sampling techniques to correct for persistent undercounting of minorities and other underrepresented groups. Riche had been among a group of officials pushing sampling, but was frequently frustrated by interruptions from higher-ups in the Commerce Department when she would speak to Congress on the issue.

== Later life ==
After her resignation, Riche went into private consulting and took a research faculty position at the University of Maryland, College Park. Later, she became a fellow at Cornell's Center for the Study of Society and Economy.
