= Willis Harman =

American electrical engineer

Willis W. Harman
- Born: August 16, 1918; Seattle, Washington
- Died: January 30, 1997 (aged 78); Stanford, California
- Education: University of Washington; Stanford University
- Children: W. Dean Harman
- Scientific career
- Fields: Electrical engineering Sociocultural evolution
- Workplaces: Stanford University; SRI International; Institute of Noetic Sciences; World Business Academy
- Theses: Beam-loading effects in small reflex klystrons (1948); Tunable waveguide cavity resonators for broadband operation of reflex klystrons (1948)
- Doctoral advisor: Karl Spangenberg
- Doctoral students: John B. Thomas; Nils Nilsson; Norman Abramson

Willis W. Harman (August 16, 1918 – January 30, 1997) was an American engineer, futurist, and author associated with the human potential movement. He was convinced that late industrial civilization faced a period of major cultural crisis which called for a profound transformation of human consciousness. Over a career lasting some four decades, he worked to raise public awareness on the subject through his writings and to foster relevant research through the nonprofit research institute SRI International, the Institute of Noetic Sciences (IONS), and the World Business Academy (WBA). He served as president of IONS for two decades, and he was a cofounder of the WBA. His many books include volumes coauthored with the futurist Howard Rheingold, who put forward similar views, and the mythologist Joseph Campbell.

== Early life and education ==
Willis W. Harman was born in Seattle, Washington on August 16, 1918. His father was a hydroelectric engineer and his mother was a music teacher. He attended the Western Washington College of Education before moving on to graduate from the University of Washington in 1939 with a B.S. in electrical engineering.

After graduation, he worked for General Electric and then joined the Navy as an electrical officer. He was stationed on the USS Maryland (BB-46) but was ashore at his home near Pearl Harbor during the 1941 attack on Pearl Harbor. After the end of World War II, Harman received his M.S. in physics and Ph.D. in electrical engineering from Stanford University in 1948.

== Academic career ==
Harman taught for several years at the University of Florida before joining the Stanford faculty in 1952 to teach electrical engineering and physics. In 1966, his faculty line was transferred from the Department of Electrical Engineering to the Department of Engineering-Economic Systems (since absorbed by the Department of Management Science and Engineering) at the behest of founding chair Bill Linvill.

In 1954, he attended a summer seminar on ethics, meditation, and the spiritual life that had a transformative effect on both his thinking and his career. He later said of this experience that it "opened up vast areas I didn't even know were there. It completely changed my concept of what is important in education, and in time led to various activities in the field of humanistic psychology."

Harman became convinced that Western culture was facing a spiritual and moral crisis stemming from the ravages of industrialism and its economic logic, which he came to call the "World Macroproblem". As Harman saw it, "If you look at the assumptions underlying our economic system – especially the ones regarding the prerogatives of ownership – and then you look at the goals we humans have about how we want to live our lives, there is no compatibility. The assumptions can never lead to the goals." In his view, this crisis that called for development of both an "ecological ethic" and a "self-realization ethic". In short, society needed to transform its institutions to support the personal development of individual human beings within an environment of limited resources. Because Harman considered humans an integral part of the natural world, he saw individual self-realization and environmental sustainability as synergistic rather than contradictory paths forward. Harman also recognized the large (and often problematic) role that unconscious processes play in human culture and foresaw that work was needed to better understand how such processes might be harnessed in positive ways.

Harman incorporated his new perspective in a popular Stanford graduate seminar called "The Human Potential" that covered topics ranging from meditation to psychedelic drugs to parapsychology.

In 1980, he was appointed a regent of the University of California by Governor Jerry Brown. He served as a regent for ten years.

== SRI International ==
From 1967 to 1984, Harman held joint appointments as a senior social scientist at SRI International and director of SRI's Educational Policy Research Center. There he initiated a research program focused on solving the problems posed by uncontrolled industrial development. This work led to his 1976 book An Incomplete Guide to the Future, with its vision of a transindustrial society. Unlike many futurists, Harman did not believe that the future was predictable simply by projecting current trends; consequently, a hallmark of his work is his ability to conceive ideas about the future that don't clearly stem from present tendencies.

At SRI, Harman recruited Alfred Matthew Hubbard to the Alternative Futures Project, one of the goals of which was to introduce business and thought leaders to LSD.

== Institute of Noetic Sciences ==
Harman was invited by astronaut Edgar Mitchell and writer/speaker Christopher Hegarty ("How to Manage Your Boss") to join the Institute of Noetic Sciences (IONS) in Sausalito in 1973, the year it was founded. He went on to serve as its president from 1978 until his death in 1997. He described IONS' mission as bringing science and religion back together, though in ways that would require fundamental changes in both.

Harman was in charge of "Global Mind Change", then one of four major IONS programs, and was a prophet of Social Media and the Internet. Besides supporting Harman's 1988 book of the same title, it sponsored citizen tours of the USSR and other activities.

== World Business Academy ==
In 1987, Harman cofounded the World Business Academy with Rinaldo Brutoco and other businesspeople. The WBA grew out of his conviction that business would play a critical role in the period of profound social transformation that Harman foresaw. Its goal was to foster smoother change by helping business leaders assume new roles of social responsibility.

== Family and death ==
In 1941, Harman married Charlene Reamer, who survived him. They had three daughters (Billie, Mary, and Susan) and a son, Dean.

Harman died of brain cancer.

== Quotes ==
"A noetic science—a science of consciousness and the world of inner experience—is the most promising contemporary framework within which to carry on that fundamental moral inquiry which stable human societies have always had to place at the center of their concerns."

"Business has become, in this last half-century, the most powerful institution on the planet; it is critical that the dominant institution in any society take responsibility for the whole, as the church did in the days of the Holy Roman Empire. But business has not had such a tradition."

"The assumptions about economic progress seemed to work rather well during the time when you could equate material progress with general benefit. But that equation doesn’t work anymore. We now have a system that works to the benefit of the few and penalizes masses of people today and in the future."

"All the things that I had been taught all of my life were of value clearly were of no value at all. In a few instants they would be gone. But one thing is of value—and only one. Alan Watts called it 'the Supreme Identity'—the identification with the Divine."

== Selected works ==
- Biology Revisioned (with Elizabet Sahtouris, 1998)
- Global Mind Change: The Promise of the 21st Century (2nd ed., 1998)
- The New Business of Business: Taking Responsibility for a Positive Global Future (with Maya Porter, 1997)
- Intuition at Work: Pathways to Unlimited Possibilities (with Roger Franz and Joel Levey, 1996)
- The New Metaphysical Foundations of Modern Science (with Jane Clark, 1994)
- New Traditions in Business: Spirit and Leadership in the 21st Century (1991)
- Creative Work: The Constructive Role of Business N A Transforming Society (1991)
- Global Mind Change: The New Age Revolution in the Way We Think (1988/1990)
- Paths to Peace (with Richard Smoke, 1987)
- Higher Creativity: Liberating the Unconscious for Breakthrough Insight (with Howard Rheingold, 1984)
- Energy Futures, Human Values and Life Styles (1982)
- Changing Images of Man (with Joseph Campbell and O. W. Markley, 1982)
- An Incomplete Guide to the Future (1976/1979)
- Principles of the Statistical Theory of Communication (1963)
- Fundamentals of Electronic Motion (1953)
