= Robert Helliwell =

Robert A. Helliwell (September 2, 1920 – May 3, 2011) was an electrical engineer and professor at Stanford University. He was one of the pioneering scientists in the study of whistlers and related ionospheric phenomena.

== Early life ==
Helliwell was born in Red Wing, Minnesota, on September 2, 1920. He and his mother moved to Palo Alto, California after his father died. Helliwell and his wife, whom he knew in high school, were both undergraduates at Stanford University.

== Career ==
Helliwell was associated with Stanford University for his entire career, receiving all his academic credentials there and becoming a member of the electrical engineering faculty in 1946. Helliwell received his AB degree in 1942, a combined MA and electrical engineering degree in 1944, and his PhD in 1948.

== Whistlers ==
Helliwell's greatest discovery was accidental, as is often the case in science. Helliwell and one of his students, Jack Mallinckrodt, were investigating lightning noise at very low radio frequencies at Stanford University in 1950. Mallinckrodt heard some whistling sounds and brought them to Helliwell's attention. As Helliwell recalled in an article in the October 1982, issue of the Stanford Engineer, he thought it was an artifact, but he stood radio watch with Mallinckrodt until he heard these whistlers for himself. Helliwell described these sounds as "weird, strange and unbelievable as flying saucers" in a 1954 article in the Palo Alto Times.

== Research ==
In true scientific fashion, Helliwell tried to understand the mechanism involved in the production of whistlers. He conducted experiments at the VLF outpost, Siple Station in West Antarctica, which was active from 1971 to 1988. Since the wavelength of VLF radio signals is huge (a frequency of 10 kHz corresponds to a wavelength of 30 kilometers, or 18.64 miles), the Siple Station had an antenna that was thirteen miles long. The antenna was used to transmit VLF radio signals into Earth's magnetosphere, to be detected half a world away in Canada. It was possible to inject these signals into the magnetosphere, since the ionosphere is transparent to these low frequencies.

== Writings ==
Helliwell was the author of one book, "Whistlers and Related Ionospheric Phenomena," and more than 90 scientific papers. Three of his papers deserve special mention. One of these reported on low frequency emissions associated with the 1989 Loma Prieta earthquake. Another describes how injection of a low frequency radio signal into the magnetosphere causes a radio quieting of the natural noise that's associated with these frequencies. Another paper showed that the alternating current power grids in North America (60 Hz) and Europe (50 Hz) affect auroral chorus emissions.

== Honors ==
Helliwell was a fellow of the Institute of Electrical and Electronics Engineers and the American Geophysical Union, and a member of the American Association for the Advancement of Science and the United States National Academy of Sciences. The National Science Foundation named a range of hills in Antarctica, along the coast of Victoria Land on the Ross Sea, the Helliwell Hills in his honor.

== See also ==
- Whistler
- Very low frequency
