= Robert C. Pittman =

Robert Pittman
- Born: April 25, 1922
- Died: October 27, 1996 (aged 74); Naples, Florida
- Education: University of Florida
- Occupations: Pilot and entrepreneur

Robert C. Pittman (April 25, 1922 – October 27, 1996) was a US Army Air Forces pilot, electrical engineer, and entrepreneur. He was awarded the Distinguished Flying Cross for his heroic actions during World War II, flying more than 250 combat missions over the Pacific Ocean.

Pittman graduated from the University of Florida with a degree in Electrical Engineering in 1950 on a scholarship funded by the G.I. Bill. He went on to work for Bell Laboratories and International Telephone and Telegraph in various engineering roles; he became president of ITT's Federal Electric Corporation, and later Group General Manager. In 1976, he bought and operated Superior Cable Company, the first manufacturer of fiber-optic cable that later became Superior Essex.

Pittman died on October 27, 1996 in Naples, Florida. He is survived by his children Robert Pittman (deceased), Clark B. Pittman, and Katherine P. Dennis.
