= William Littell Everitt =

American academic and electrical engineer

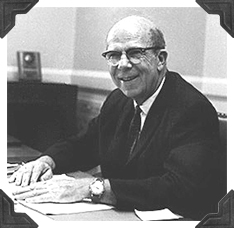
- Born: April 14, 1900; Baltimore, Maryland
- Died: September 6, 1986 (aged 86)
- Education: Cornell University E.E. University of Michigan M.S. Ohio State University Ph.D.
- Children: 3, including Barbara Everitt Bryant
- Awards: IEEE Medal of Honor (1954); IEEE James H. Mulligan, Jr. Education Medal (1957)
- Scientific career
- Fields: Electrical engineering
- Workplaces: Ohio State University, University of Illinois at Urbana-Champaign
- Doctoral advisor: Frederic Columbus Blake
- Doctoral students: Karl Spangenberg

William Littell Everitt (April 14, 1900 – September 6, 1986) was a noted American electrical engineer, educator, and founding member of the National Academy of Engineering. He received his Ph.D. from Ohio State University in 1933. He was adviser of numerous outstanding scientists at OSU including Karl Spangenberg, and Nelson Wax. His PhD adviser was Frederic Columbus Blake.

== Early life ==
Everitt was born in Baltimore, Maryland. From 1918 to 1919 he served in the United States Marine Corps, then joined Cornell University to study electrical engineering where he received his E.E. degree in 1922. From 1922 to 1924 he worked at the North Electric Manufacturing Company of Galion, Ohio, on telephony switchboards, then studied electrical engineering at the University of Michigan where he received his M.A. in 1926.

He then joined Ohio State University (OSU) as assistant professor, becoming associate professor (1929) and full professor (1933) when he received that institution's Ph.D. under Frederic Blake. His dissertation was entitled The Calculation and Design of Alternating Current Networks Employing Triodes Operating During a Portion of a Cycle. While at OSU he developed the theory of Class B and Class C electronic amplifiers.

== Career ==
In 1940, Everitt was appointed to the National Defense Research Committee's Communications Section, and in 1942 became director of operations research with the United States Army Signal Corps, for which he received the Exceptionally Meritorious Civilian Award (1946). He was then professor of electrical engineering and head of department at the University of Illinois at Urbana-Champaign (1944–1949) and dean (1949–1968). One of the engineering buildings there bears his name.

In his long career, Everitt was a radar pioneer and author of basic texts on radio engineering and communication. He invented automatic telephone equipment, a "time compressor" to accelerate recorded speech, high-power radio amplification, a frequency modulation radio altimeter, and several antenna matching and feeding systems. His textbook Communications Engineering, first published in 1932, was a classic in the field.

== Awards and honors ==
Everitt became Institute of Radio Engineers Fellow (1938), President (1945), and received its IEEE Medal of Honor in 1954 "for his distinguished career as author, educator and scientist; for his contributions in establishing electronics and communications as a major branch of electrical engineering; for his unselfish service to his country; for his leadership in the affairs of the Institute of Radio Engineers." He was named to the National Academy of Engineering in 1964. Everitt was also a Fellow of AIEE, and a member of the American Association for the Advancement of Science, the American Society for Engineering Education, the Acoustical Society of America, Eta Kappa Nu, the National Council of Tau Beta Pi, and Sigma Xi, and received 10 honorary doctorate degrees.

== Personal life ==
Everitt's daughter, Barbara Everitt Bryant, became the first woman to direct the United States Census Bureau.

== Selected works ==
- Communication engineering, 1st ed., New York London, McGraw-Hill, 1932.
