= Nichols radiometer =

Tool for measuring radiation pressure

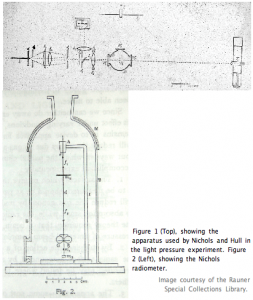
Figures 1 and 2 in A Preliminary communication on the pressure of heat and light radiation, Phys. Rev. 13, 307-320 (1901).

A Nichols radiometer was the apparatus used by Ernest Fox Nichols and Gordon Ferrie Hull in 1901 for the measurement of radiation pressure.

It consisted of a pair of small silvered glass mirrors suspended in the manner of a torsion balance by a fine quartz fibre within an enclosure in which the air pressure could be regulated. The torsion head to which the fiber was attached could be turned from the outside using a magnet. A beam of light was directed first on one mirror and then on the other, and the opposite deflections observed with mirror and scale. By turning the mirror system around to receive the light on the unsilvered side, the influence of the air in the enclosure could be ascertained. This influence was found to be of almost negligible value at an air pressure of about 16 mmHg (2.1 kPa; 0.021 atm; 0.31 psi). The radiant energy of the incident beam was deduced from its heating effect upon a small blackened silver disk, which was found to be more reliable than the bolometer when it was first used. With this apparatus, the experimenters were able to obtain an agreement between observed and computed radiation pressures within about 0.6%.

The original apparatus is at the Smithsonian Institution.

This apparatus is sometimes confused with the Crookes radiometer of 1873.

The original papers, with their historical context, have been re-printed in a chapter of the book Quantum Photonics: Pioneering Advances and Emerging Applications.

== See also ==
- Solar sail
