= Ernest Fox Nichols =

American physicist and educator (1869–1924)

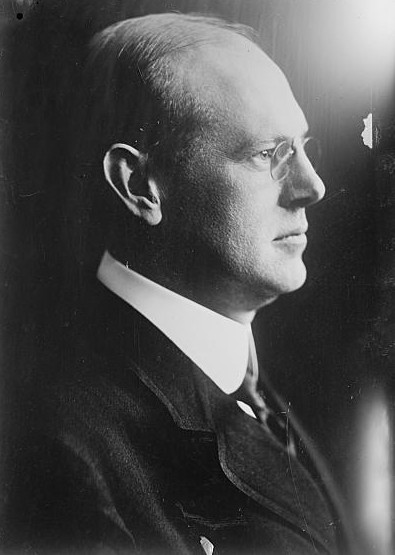

10th President of Dartmouth College
- In office 1909–1916
- Preceded by: William Jewett Tucker
- Succeeded by: Ernest Martin Hopkins

7th President of the Massachusetts Institute of Technology
- In office 1921–1922
- Preceded by: Elihu Thomson (acting)
- Succeeded by: Samuel Wesley Stratton

Personal details
- Born: July 1, 1869 Leavenworth, Kansas
- Died: April 29, 1924 (aged 54) Washington, D.C.
- Education: Kansas State University (BS); Cornell University (MS), (D.Sc.)

Ernest Fox Nichols (June 1, 1869 – April 29, 1924) was an American educator and physicist. He served as the 10th President of Dartmouth College.

== Early life ==
Nichols was born in Leavenworth County, Kansas, and received his undergraduate degree from Kansas State University in 1888. After working for a year in the Chemistry Department at Kansas State, he matriculated to graduate school at Cornell University, where he received degrees in 1893 and 1897. He also studied at the University of Berlin and Cambridge University.

== Career and death ==
Nichols served as a professor of physics at Colgate University from 1892 to 1898, at Dartmouth College from 1898 to 1903, and Columbia University from 1903 to 1909. Nichols was awarded the Rumford Prize by the American Academy of Arts and Sciences in 1905 for his proof that light exerts pressure. The following year, he was elected to the American Philosophical Society. He was also elected vice president of the National Academy of Sciences. He was adviser of numerous outstanding scientists in Columbia University including Frederic Columbus Blake. His PhD adviser was Edward Leamington Nichols.

He served as the President of Dartmouth College from 1909 to 1916. In 1921, he became the president of the Massachusetts Institute of Technology (MIT), but was too ill from heart disease during his brief tenure to enter actively into his responsibilities, and stepped down in 1922. On April 29, 1924, Dr. Nichols was invited to the inauguration of the new building of the American National Academy of Sciences in Washington, D.C., and was reading a research paper to the audience when he collapsed and died.

== Dartmouth presidency ==
The appointment of Ernest Fox Nichols as the 10th president in the Wheelock Succession could be seen as both a reflection of the times and a tribute to the quality of Dartmouth's faculty. A member of the physics department and its chair at the time of his appointment, Nichols' pioneering work in the measurement of radiation expanded the frontiers of knowledge at the end of the 19th century. He was the first Dartmouth president since John Wheelock who was not a member of the clergy, yet his deep appreciation of the importance of broad-based scholarship to the moral and spiritual growth of students was internationally recognized.

Many of the college's most cherished institutions and traditions took shape during the Nichols administration, including the Dartmouth Outing Club and Winter Carnival. In addition, to improve communications between Dartmouth and its growing body of graduates, President Nichols established the Dartmouth Council of Alumni.

Ernest Fox Nichols stepped down in 1916 to become a professor of physics at Yale University and subsequently became president of the Massachusetts Institute of Technology.

== See also ==
- Nichols radiometer

== Sources ==
- Ernest Fox Nichols—Biographical Memoirs of the National Academy of Sciences

Academic offices
Preceded by William Jewett Tucker	10th President of Dartmouth College; 1909 – 1916	Succeeded by Ernest Martin Hopkins
Preceded by Richard Cockburn Maclaurin	7th President of the Massachusetts Institute of Technology; 1921 – 1922	Succeeded by Samuel Wesley Stratton
