= Political positions of Pete Hegseth =

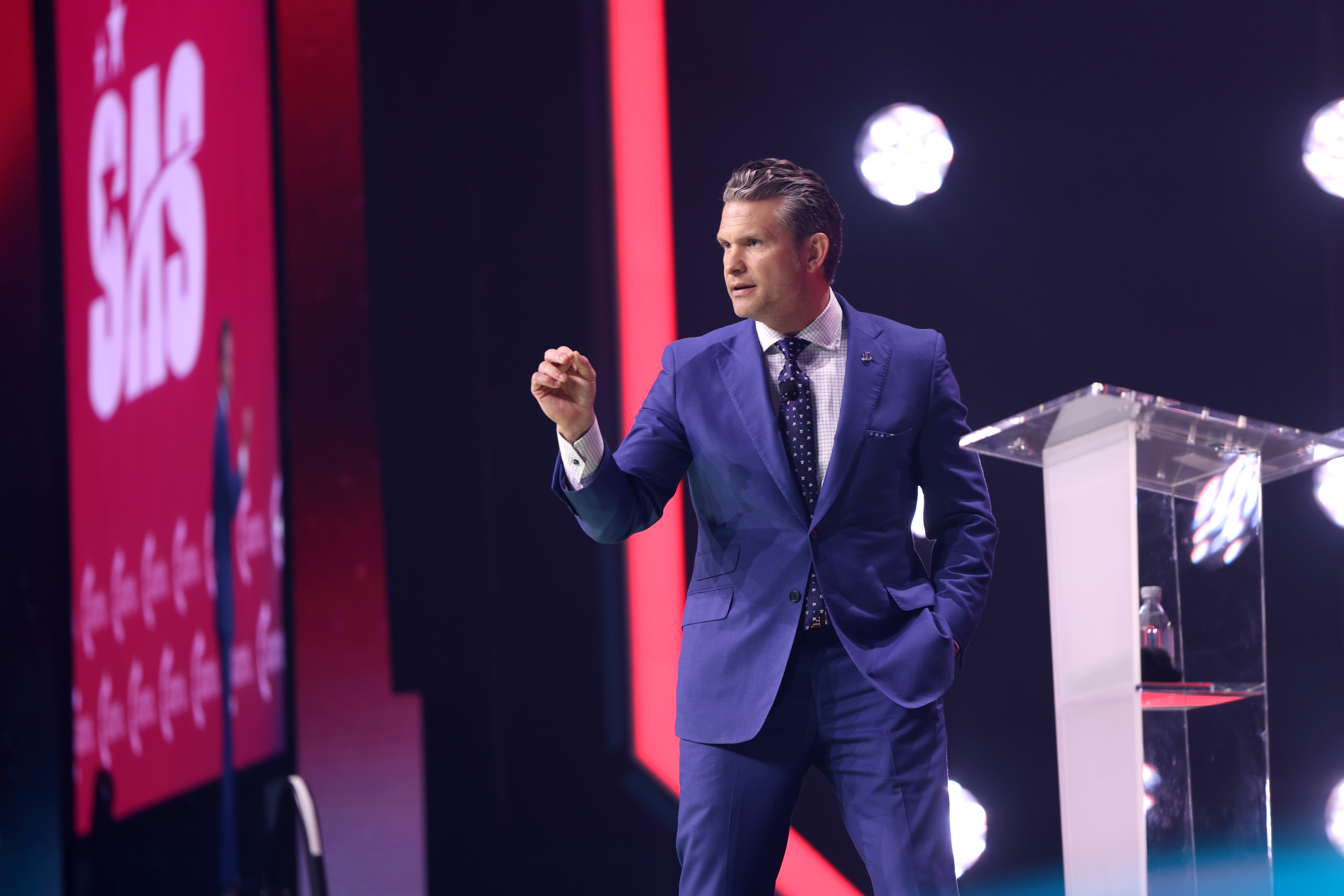
Hegseth speaking at a Turning Point USA event, 2025

Pete Hegseth, who is the 29th United States secretary of defense, has been described as a Christian nationalist, a Christian patriot, and an ultraconservative. In his 2020 book, American Crusade: Our Fight to Stay Free, Hegseth said he believes there are "irreconcilable differences between the Left and the Right in America leading to perpetual conflict that cannot be resolved through the political process". He furthermore called for an "American crusade", which he described as "a holy war for the righteous cause of human freedom". Hegseth characterizes "Americanism" in being opposition to forces like feminism, globalism, Marxism and progressivism and says either "Americanism" will prevail or "death" will. In a May 2024 interview where he talked about education, Hegseth emphasized that the U.S. is a constitutional republic, "Democracy, democracy, defend the democracy. Do you know what our founders did not want us to be? A democracy." Hegseth has explicitly rejected democracy in his book, equating it to a leftist demand; he has also expressed support for election-rigging through gerrymandering to "screw Democrats".

Hegseth predicted that if Democrats won the 2020 election, there would be a "national divorce", that the military and the police "will be forced to make a choice", and that "there will be some form of civil war". He also said that conservatives must "mock, humiliate, intimidate, and crush our leftist opponents" and to "attack first" to deal with a left he equates with "sedition". His book "lays out the strategy we must employ in order to defeat America's internal enemies". Hegseth has described progressives and Democrats as "enemies" of freedom, the U.S. Constitution, and America. Hegseth has said that victory for America includes the end of globalism, socialism, secularism, environmentalism, Islamism, genderism and leftism, the last of which he refers to as a "false religion" and "specter" that views non-believers as "infidels". He has announced his support for American nationalism. Hegseth believes Americans must build a border wall, raise tariffs, learn English and "fight back".

== Domestic policy ==
=== COVID-19 ===
In February 2020, amid the spread of the COVID-19 pandemic in the United States, Hegseth said that Democrats were "rooting for coronavirus to spread. They're rooting for it to grow. They're rooting for the problem to get worse." The next month, Hegseth urged healthy people to get the virus to build immunity. In May 2020, during an appearance with Tucker Carlson he defended calling the SARS-CoV-2 the "Wuhan virus, Chinese virus, maybe even the 'Kung Flu.' A little off-color, but funny and you know, we still live in a free country the last time I checked." Hegseth suggested the Omicron variant of COVID-19 was made up by Democrats to help them in the 2022 midterm elections, saying, "Count on a variant about every October, every two years."

=== Education ===
In August 2019, he lamented that "young kids voting" are worried about the adverse effects of climate change. Hegseth also criticized universities for teaching students about "environmentalism and radical environmentalism" rather than a "real threat" such as Islamic extremism.

In June 2022, on a Fox & Friends Weekend segment, Hegseth crossed out Harvard on his diploma, writing in "Critical Theory" and then marking "Return to Sender" across the central body as a protest of Harvard and other such universities. "People will say 'this is just a stunt, you still have a degree' and that's fine. I went, I got the degree, I walked to the classes and all that, but I hope this is a statement that as conservatives and patriots, if we love this country, we can't keep sending our kids and elevating them to universities that are poisoning their mind. I may have survived it, but a lot of kids go there and buy into 'critical theory university,' and that's how we get future leaders, Supreme Court Justices, Senators, others, who see America as an evil place. And Harvard is a factory for that kind of thinking" he said. Hegseth then declared his intention to return the diploma to Harvard.

In 2024, at podcasts with Joshua Haymes, Hegseth criticized public schools for implementing an "egalitarian, dystopian LGBT nightmare". In regards to public schools, he said "The phrase we use in the military is ‘the X’. If you’re standing on the X in an ambush, you’re dead. That means the enemy’s guns are pointed at you. We are all on the X right now, our kids are on the X in government schools." He continues by saying children in school are " accosted and assaulted on a daily basis with evil ideologies that are corrupting their mind, that are corrupting their affections and leaving them incapable of seeking the kind of wisdom that’s required". He proposes an "insurgency" or "guerrilla war" in response, and calls on those who seek to wage an insurgency against public education to emulate Taliban's tactics, saying "Delegitimizing your enemy is a huge part of insurgency, to use the Afghanistan example, that’s what the Taliban did for two decades." He says to delegitimize public education, its opponents could say "these schools fail everybody. No one learns anything in them" and that they are "indoctrination camps. They’re transing your kids". He also supports installing cameras in classrooms.

=== Immigration and border security ===
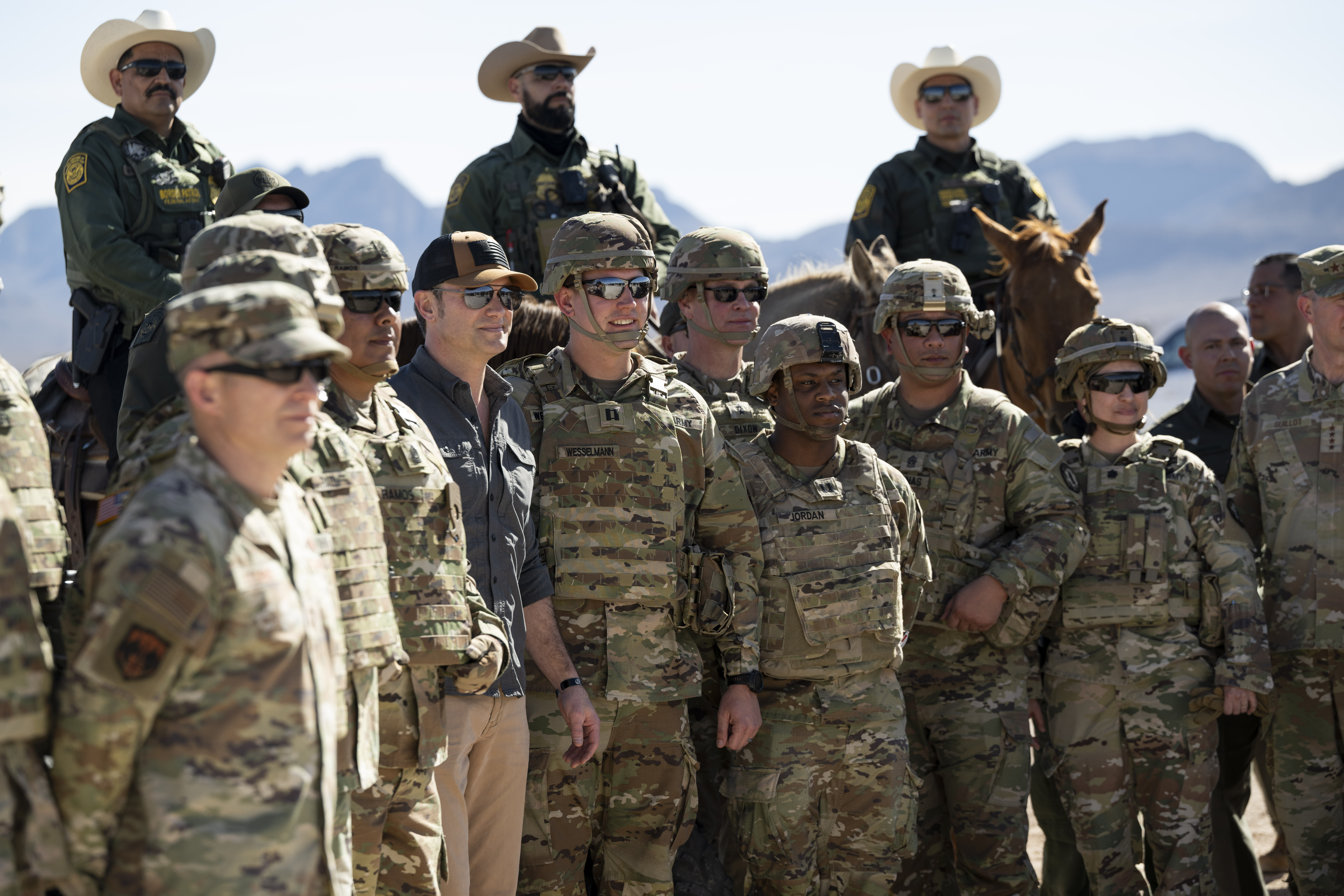
Hegseth with federal troops and U.S. Border Patrol agents, El Paso, Texas, February 3, 2025

Hegseth supports strengthening border security by constructing a border wall at the Mexico–United States border.

=== Healthcare ===
Hegseth supports Social Security reform, including cuts to Medicare and Medicaid. He supports raising the retirement age and reducing benefits for high-income Americans. During his 2012 campaign for US Senate, he stated; "Pete Hegseth is ideologically dedicated to privatizing Social Security."

=== January 6 Capitol attack ===
Hegseth has falsely claimed that the 2020 presidential election was stolen from Donald Trump. As a co-host on Fox and Friends making that statement, he was referred to in the 2021 court case Dominion Voting Systems v. Fox News Network as a person responsible for the slander against the voting machine company. He defended the rioters who attacked the U.S. Capitol on January 6, 2021, calling them patriots who had been "re-awoken to the reality of what the left has done" to the country. He has defended January 6 figure Jacob Chansley in particular. Days after the attack, Hegseth appeared on a podcast hosted by Newt Gingrich, where he downplayed the violence during the attack, and also spread conspiracy theories alleging the attack was instigated by Antifa.

== Foreign policy ==
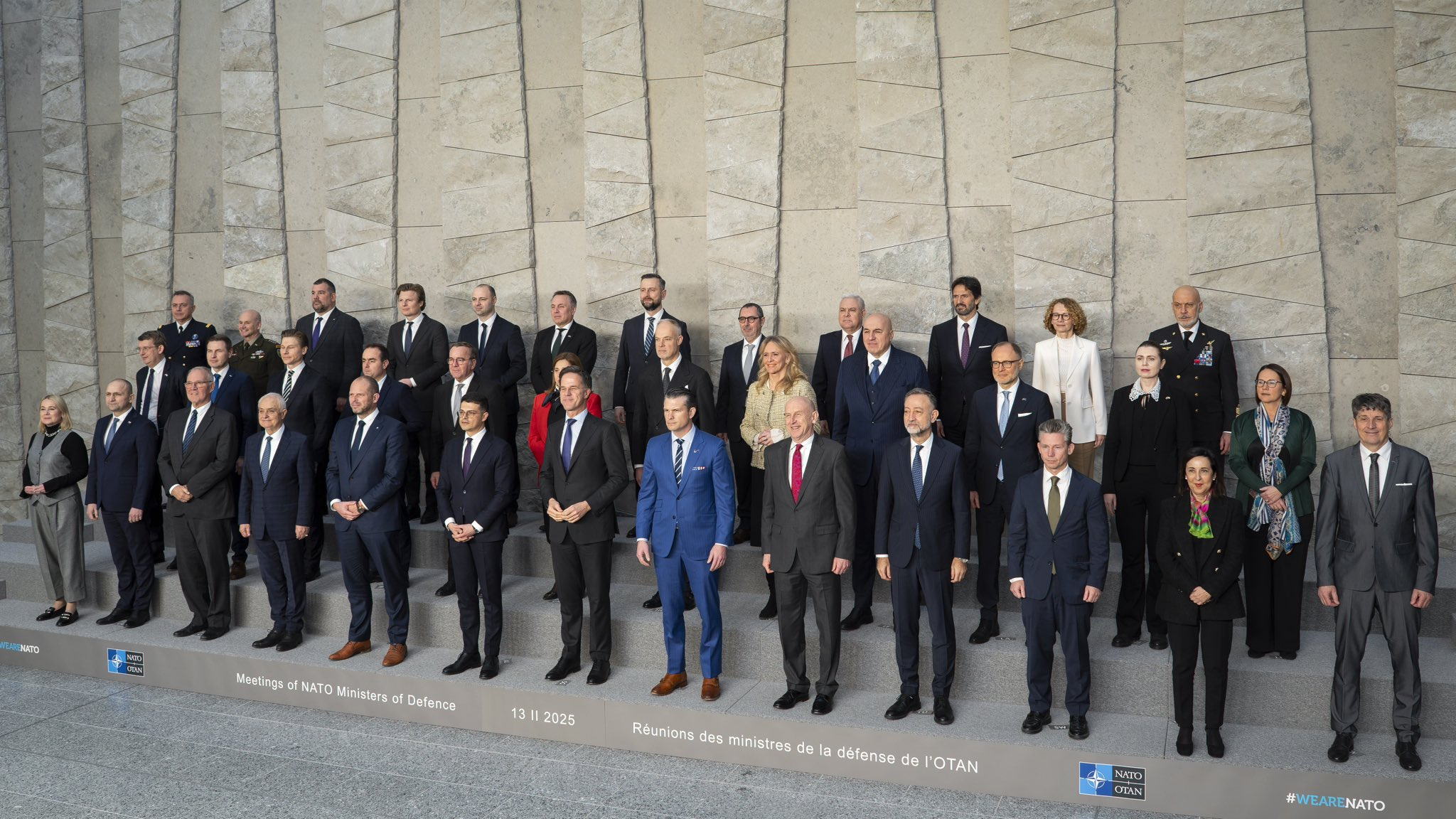
Hegseth attending the 2025 NATO Ministers of Defence Conference

Hegseth has been sharply critical of America's NATO allies, writing, "Outdated, outgunned, invaded, and impotent. Why should America, the European 'emergency contact number' for the past century, listen to self-righteous and impotent nations asking us to honor outdated and one-sided defense arrangements they no longer live up to?" and "Maybe if NATO countries actually ponied up for their own defense – but they don't. They just yell about the rules while gutting their militaries and yelling at America for help." In American Crusade, he said "NATO is not an alliance; it’s a defense arrangement for Europe, paid for and underwritten by the United States" and called on it to be "scrapped and remade in order for freedom to be truly defended". He criticized Turkey's membership of NATO, saying Turkish president Recep Tayyip Erdoğan "openly dreams of restoring the Ottoman empire" and is "an Islamist with Islamist visions for the Middle East".

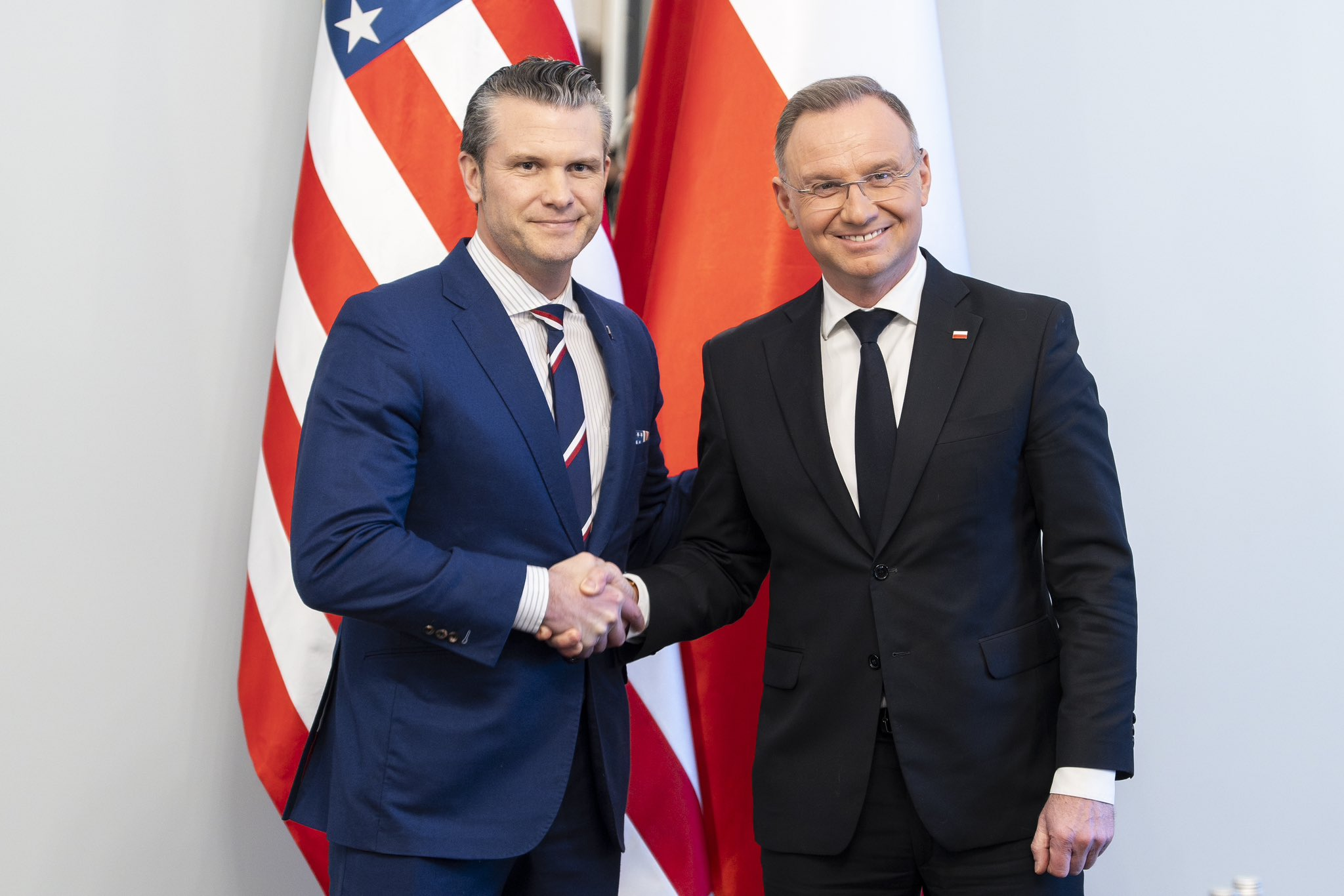
Hegseth with President of Poland Andrzej Duda, February 2025

He criticized US funding for the United Nations in American Crusade, calling it "a fully globalist organization that aggressively advances an anti-American, anti-Israel, and anti-freedom agenda. Here’s one set of rules for the United States and Israel, another for everyone else." In 2022, he said the Russian invasion of Ukraine "pales in comparison" to "wokeness" and crime. In March 2022, he called Russian president Vladimir Putin a war criminal. He said: "What's at stake is repelling an authoritarian who basically is saying 'I want the Soviet Union back, I want Ukraine back, I want Kyiv back.'" He has also voiced criticism of US military aid to Ukraine.

Hegseth has called Iran's government an "evil regime". In January 2020, Hegseth expressed strong support for Trump's decision to kill Iranian general Qasem Soleimani. He also called on Trump to bomb the Iranian homeland, including cultural sites if they were storing weapons. In May 2020, Hegseth said the "communist Chinese" wanted to "end our civilization". Hegseth later said China was creating a military "specifically dedicated to defeating the United States of America".

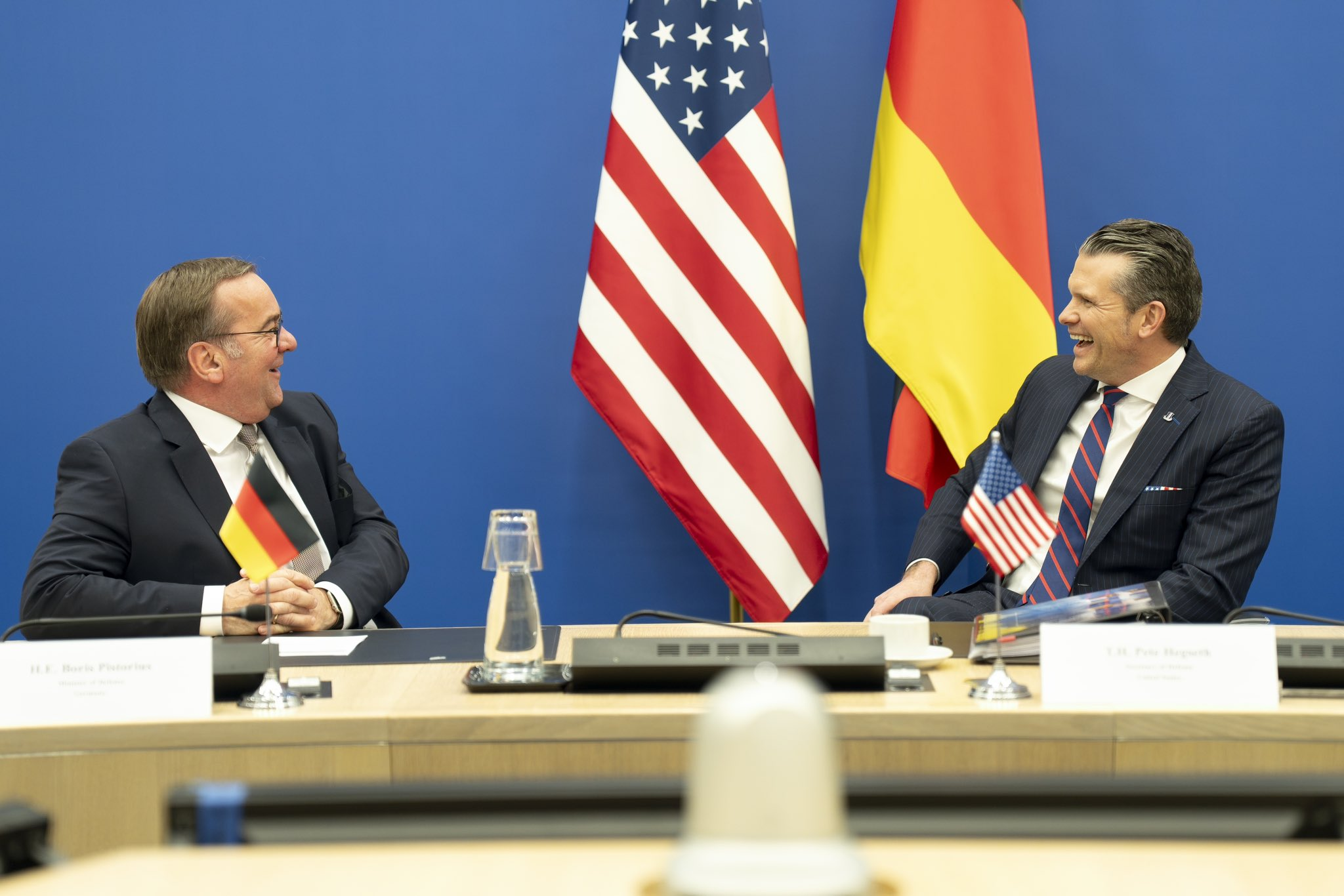
Hegseth with German Defence Minister Boris Pistorius, February 2025

Hegseth was a supporter of the Iraq War and expressed his support for the Iraq War troop surge in a 2006 op-ed.

=== Israel ===
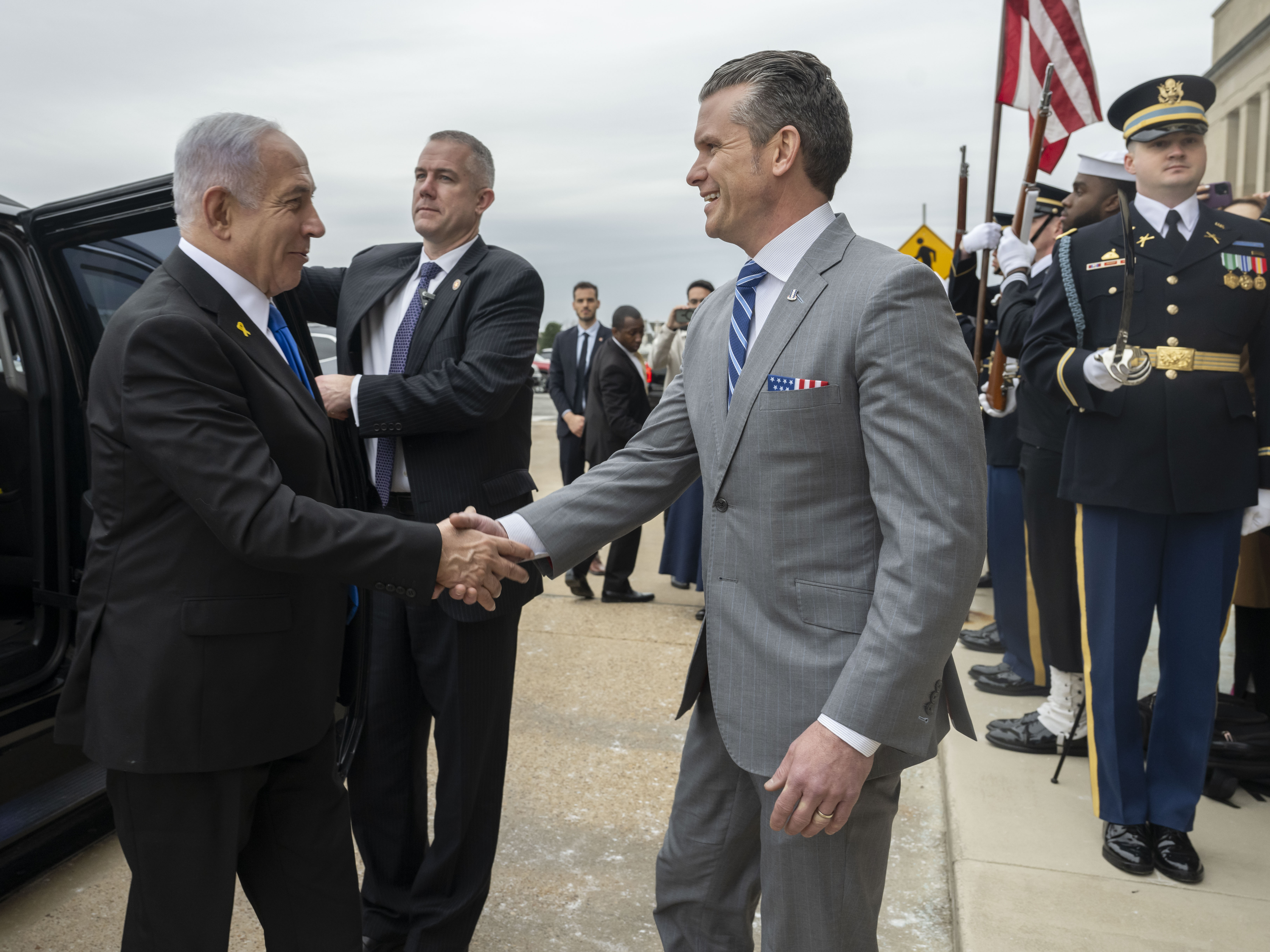
Hegseth with Prime Minister of Israel Benjamin Netanyahu, 2025

In a 2016 interview Hegseth referred to Israel as "God's chosen people". Hegseth spoke at the 2018 Arutz Sheva conference in Jerusalem, where he stated "there's no reason why the miracle of the re-establishment of the Temple on the Temple Mount is not possible." Speaking at the National Council of Young Israel gala in New York City the same year, he said "Zionism and Americanism are the front lines of Western civilization and freedom in our world today." He opposed the two-state solution and supported Israeli sovereignty over the occupied West Bank. Hegseth has stated that Israel and other international allies can help America defeat its "domestic enemies" which he describes as leftists, progressives, and Democrats. In American Crusade, he compared his support for Israel to the Crusades, saying "We don’t want to fight, but, like our fellow Christians a thousand years ago, we must. We need an American crusade." He also states that "if you love those, learn to love the state of Israel".

During Hegseth's tenure as defense secretary, he called Israel a "model ally for the region" on a phone conversation with Israeli Minister of Defense Israel Katz.

=== Muslim world ===
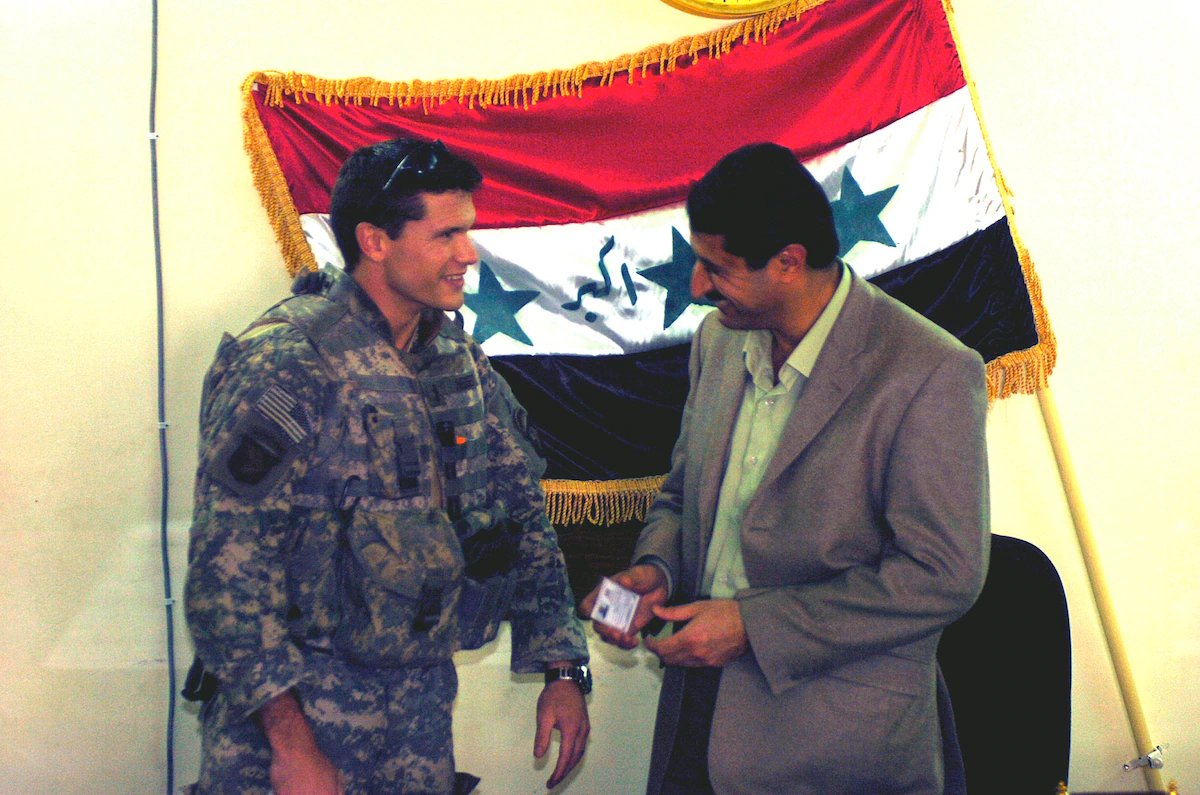
Hegseth with Samarra mayor Manmood Kalaf Ahmed, 2005

In his 2016 memoir, In the Arena, Hegseth wrote that he related to an online image of an Islamic State fighter, saying the soldier is "fighting for something greater than himself. He is fighting for his God" and continuing by saying "I recognize that fighter, even though I’ve never met him. I am drawn to him because I relate to him, I deplore what he stands for, what he does and how he does it. He is a soldier of hate, subjugation and sheer evil. But I understand his passions."

In American Crusade, Hegseth says Islam "is not a religion of peace, and it never has been" and claims "all modern Muslim countries are either formal or de facto no-go zones for practicing Christians and Jews". He said Islam was "almost entirely captured and leveraged by Islamists." He claimed Islamists planned to demographically, culturally and politically "conquer" Europe and America, allying with secularism to crush "our nation's Judeo-Christian institutions". He said Islamists planned to "seed the West with as many Muslims as possible" and "thanks to their very high birth rates relative to native populations and their strategically insular culture – the sons and daughters of those migrants and refugees multiply in greater numbers than do native citizens." He pointed out the elections of Muslim officials in the United Kingdom and the increase of the Muslim population in Europe to say that the United States would follow the same path without an intervention. Hegseth has stated that the end of the US military would allow "Islamists" to "wipe America and Israel off the map". Hegseth has faced allegations of chanting "kill all Muslims" at a work event at a bar. He has voiced support for the Crusades.

=== Controversial Comparison at Shangri-La Dialogue ===
In May 2025 at the IISS Shangri-La Dialogue in Singapore, Hegseth sparked backlash by comparing President Donald Trump to Singapore’s late founding Prime Minister Lee Kuan Yew. In his address, Hegseth described both figures as "historic men" whose leadership emphasized national interest and common sense. While he praised Lee’s long-term strategic vision and transformative leadership, he drew parallels with Trump’s political approach. The remarks provoked strong criticism across Singaporean social media, where users rejected the comparison.

== Military ==
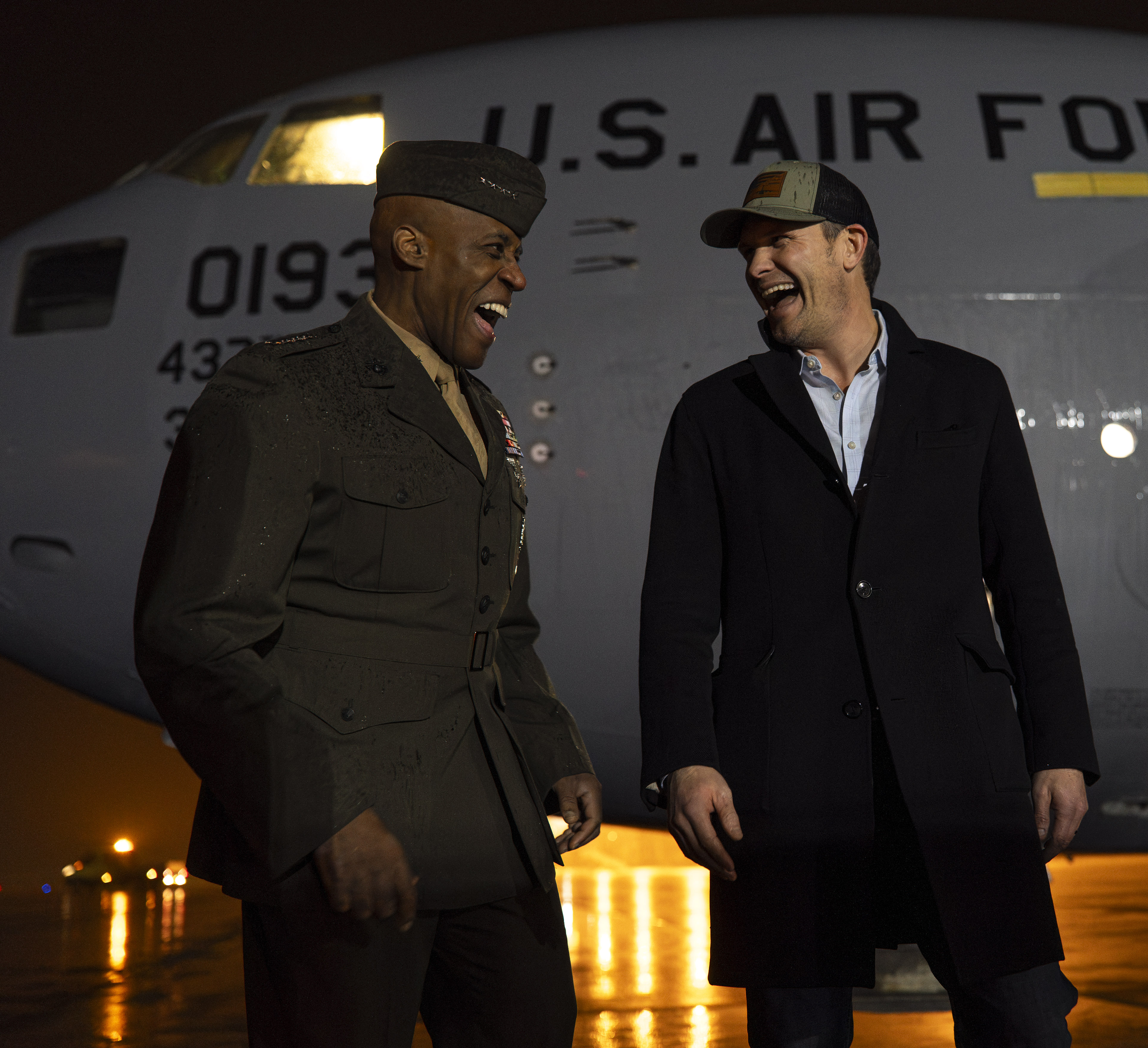
Hegseth with General Michael Langley in Stuttgart, Germany, 2025

Hegseth has advocated ending diversity, equity, and inclusion (DEI) efforts in the US military; for example, he has said that the military slogan "our diversity is our strength" is the "dumbest phrase on planet Earth". He has called for removing military leaders who support such programs: "Any general that was involved—general, admiral, whatever—that was involved in any of the DEI, woke shit has got to go." He said he supports firing General Charles Q. Brown Jr., the chairman of the Joint Chiefs of Staff. He has voiced opposition towards renaming U.S. Army installations named for Confederate soldiers. In September 2025, Hegseth announced that Medals of Honor awarded to those who took part in the Wounded Knee Massacre would not be revoked, calling them "brave soldiers".

In his 2024 book, The War on Warriors, Hegseth criticized efforts to counter extremism within the US military, writing that "Rooting out 'extremism,' today's generals push rank-and-file patriots out of their formations". He has characterized DEI and similar initiatives as "discriminatory ideologies that turn off the young, patriotic, Christian men who have traditionally filled our ranks." In the same book, Hegseth called for the US to ignore the Geneva Conventions, arguing they give enemy forces an unfair advantage: "We are just fighting with one hand behind our back – and the enemy knows it ... If our warriors are forced to follow rules arbitrarily and asked to sacrifice more lives so that international tribunals feel better about themselves, aren't we just better off winning our wars according to our own rules?!"

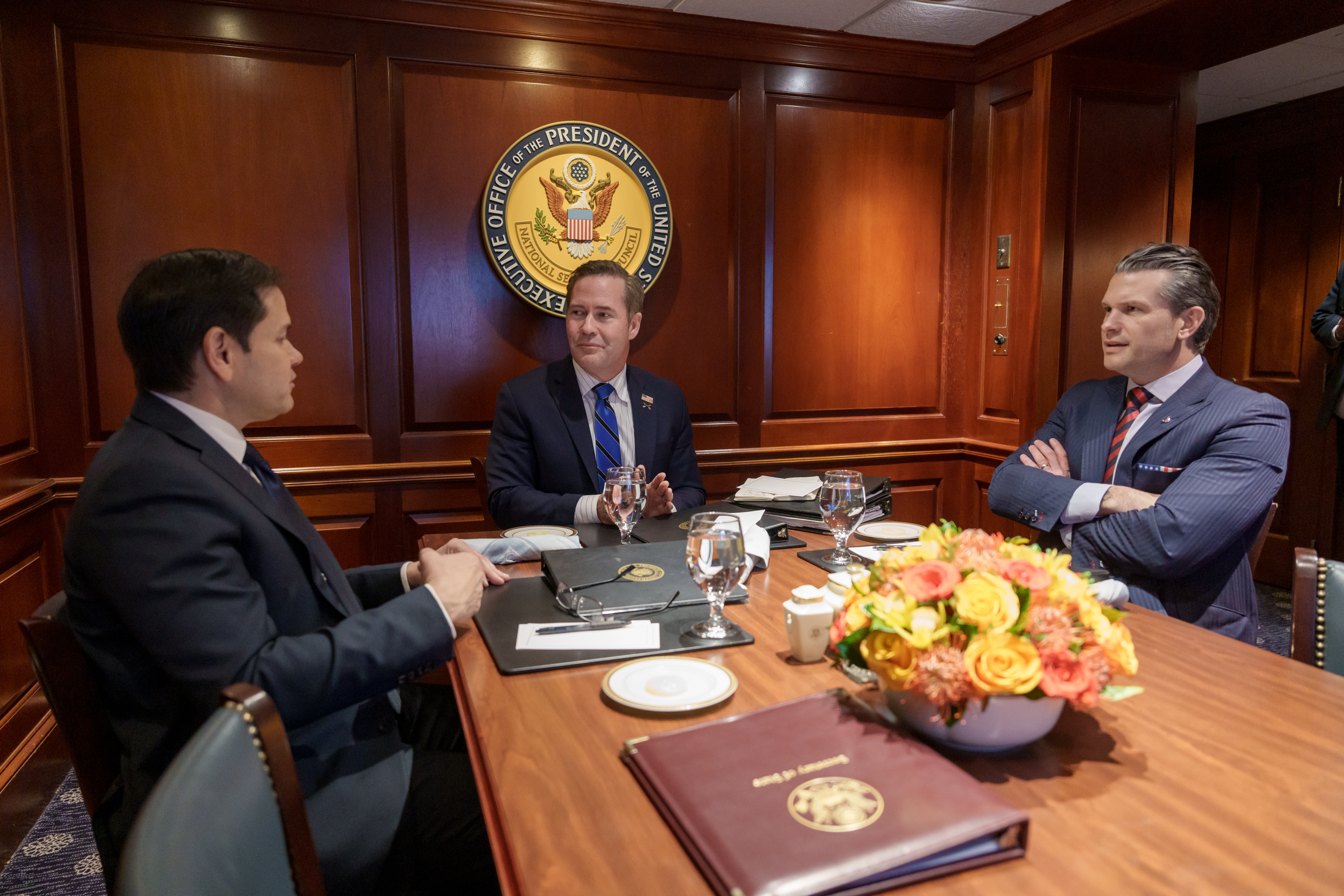
Hegseth meeting with Marco Rubio and Michael Waltz, January 2025

Hegseth has drawn parallels between military leadership and biblical figures, particularly citing the story of Gideon, who led a small force to victory. He wrote that "When we maintain our covenant, we are Gideon," emphasizing the importance of divine support in military success.

== Climate change and the environment ==
According to Politico, Hegseth has "a long history distorting and denying climate research" and has described climate change policy as a "vast left-wing conspiracy to impose government controls on American society".

== Social issues ==
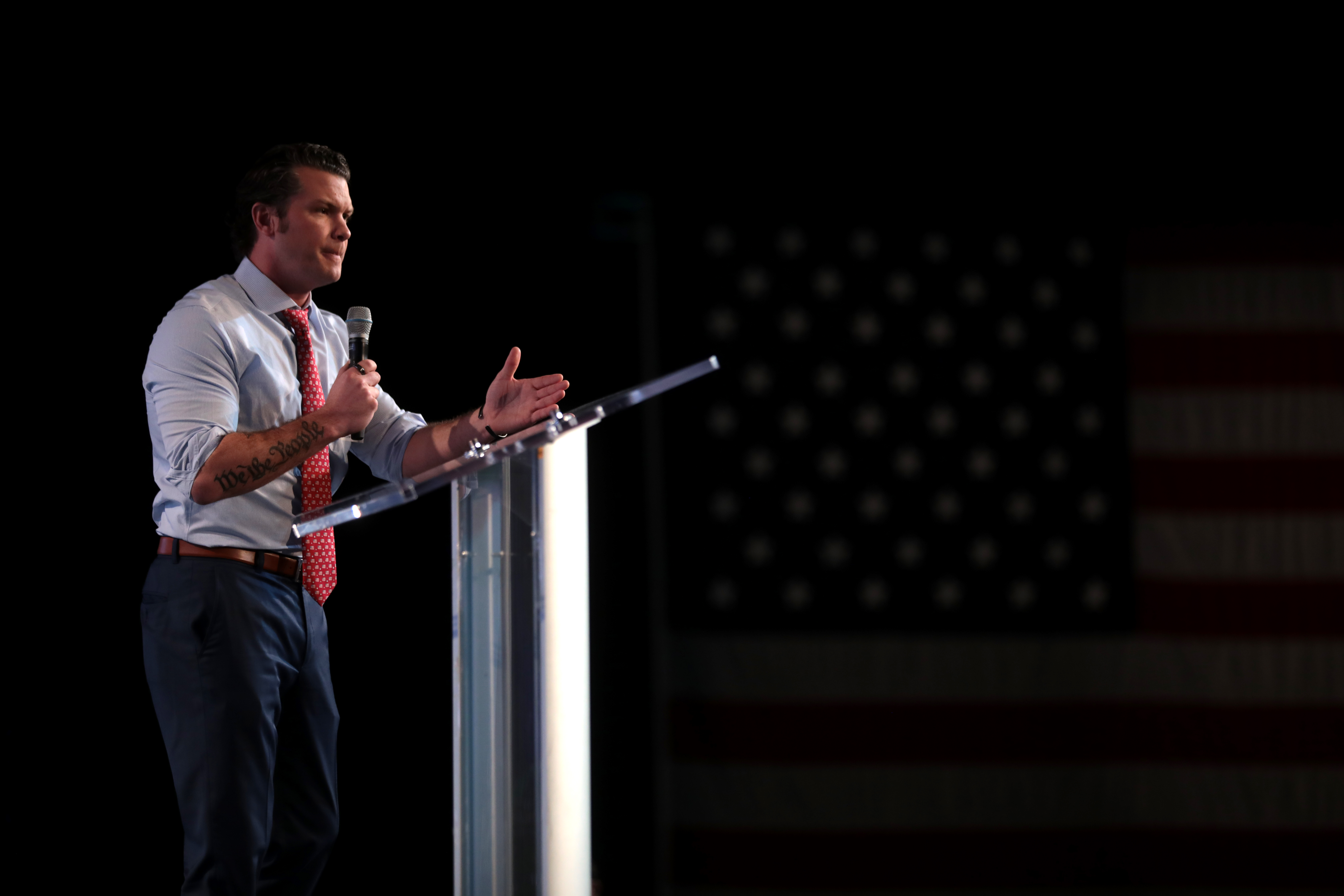
Hegseth speaking with attendees at the 2018 Student Action Summit hosted by Turning Point USA

=== Abortion ===
Hegseth is opposed to abortion in the United States. During his 2012 campaign for the US Senate, he promised to "vote to support families, uphold traditional marriage, and defend the rights of the unborn".

=== LGBTQ rights ===
When Hegseth was the publisher of The Princeton Tory in 2002, he and the publication's editors published editorials that said gay people were abnormal and should not have the right to marry.

Hegseth has since criticized policies allowing gay people to serve in the U.S. military. He has said that both the "don't ask, don't tell" policy and its 2011 repeal were gateways to broader cultural changes that undermined military cohesion. In 2015, he described such policies as "social engineering" that would "erode standards." In June 2024, Hegseth criticized a military ad featuring a soldier with two lesbian mothers as part of a "Marxist" agenda prioritizing social justice over combat readiness. In his 2024 book The War on Warriors, he wrote that he accepted LGBTQ service members early in his National Guard service, believing that because "America was at war...we needed everybody," but later came to see this as naive, stating that "our good faith was used against us." When questioned in December 2024, Hegseth told CNN he did not oppose the DADT repeal, calling citations of his writings and comments "false reporting."

In a podcast with Hugh Hewitt, Hegseth said that the recruitment challenges of the United States Armed Forces were caused by advertising that featured diverse service members: "There are not enough lesbians in San Francisco, Hugh, to man the 82nd Airborne".

Hegseth opposes transgender troops in the military. In a podcast with Jay Cutler and Sam Mackey, Hegseth said that transgender soldiers are "not deployable" because they are "reliant on chemicals". Hegseth argued that "being transgendered in the military causes complications and differences".

Hegseth opposes same-sex marriage in the United States. During his 2012 campaign for the US Senate, he promised to "vote to support families, uphold traditional marriage, and defend the rights of the unborn".

=== Women's rights ===
Regarding women serving on the front lines, Hegseth has said, "I'm straight up just saying we should not have women in combat roles. It hasn't made us more effective. Hasn’t made us more lethal. Has made fighting more complicated." Hegseth argued that men are more capable in combat roles because of biological factors and said "[e]verything about men and women serving together makes the situation more complicated, and complication in combat means casualties are worse".

According to an affidavit from his former sister-in-law, Danielle Hegseth, Hegseth once said women should not have the right to vote and that they "should not work".

== See also ==
- Second presidency of Donald Trump
- Political positions of JD Vance
