= The War on Warriors =

2024 book by Pete Hegseth

The War on Warriors: Behind the Betrayal of the Men Who Keep Us Free
- Author: Pete Hegseth
- Language: English
- Genre: Politics
- Publisher: Broadside Books
- Publication date: June 4, 2024
- Publication place: United States
- Media type: Print
- Pages: 256
- ISBN: 978-0-0633-8942-7

The War on Warriors: Behind the Betrayal of the Men Who Keep Us Free is a 2024 non-fiction book by later United States Secretary of Defense Pete Hegseth. In the book, Hegseth criticizes the US military for its focus on "woke" policies and counter extremism. The book gained sustained attention after Hegseth was nominated to be the Secretary of Defense by US President-elect Donald Trump.

== Contents ==
In the book, Hegseth writes that the "don't ask, don't tell" policy and its end served as a "gateway" and a "camouflage" that opened the door for broader political and ideological changes in the military, which he says undermined the effectiveness of the United States Armed Forces. He wrote that he accepted LGBTQ service members early in his National Guard service, believing that because "America was at war...we needed everybody," but later came to see this mindset as naive, stating that "our good faith was used against us." He compares the American left-wing to a "Jody", military slang for a person who sleeps with the spouse of a serviceperson abroad, saying they "stayed home and wrecked our house. America-wreckers, all of them". He accuses the Pentagon of being consumed by "woke" ideology after the 2020 George Floyd protests, writing they "will not stop until trans-lesbian black females run everything". He criticizes the renaming of U.S. Army installations named for Confederate soldiers and advocates for renaming Fort Liberty back to Fort Bragg; "We should change it back. We should change it back. We should change it back, because legacy matters. My uncle served at Bragg. I served at Bragg. It breaks a generational link".

In the book, Hegseth criticizes "woke" generals and leaders of elite service academies for promoting diversity, equity, and inclusion (DEI), which he says left the US military weak and "effeminate"; "Turns out, all the 'diversity' recruiting messages made certain kids—white kids—feel like they're not wanted". He criticizes efforts to counter extremism within the US military, writing that "Rooting out 'extremism,' today's generals push rank-and-file patriots out of their formations". He criticizes the Geneva Conventions, writing "The key question of our generation—of the wars in Iraq and Afghanistan—is way more complicated: what do you do if your enemy does not honor the Geneva conventions? We never got an answer. Only more war. More casualties. And no victory." He calls on the US to ignore the convention, writing "Would that not be an incentive for the other side to reconsider their barbarism? Hey, Al Qaeda: if you surrender, we might spare your life. If you do not, we will rip your arms off and feed them to hogs." He continues by saying "We are just fighting with one hand behind our back—and the enemy knows it ... If our warriors are forced to follow rules arbitrarily and asked to sacrifice more lives so that international tribunals feel better about themselves, aren't we just better off winning our wars according to our own rules?!" and also says "Who cares what other countries think?"

== Publication ==
The 256-page book was published by Broadside Books on June 4, 2024.

== Reception ==
The contents of the book gained sustained attention in 2024 after US President-elect Donald Trump nominated Hegseth to serve as the United States Secretary of Defense.

Ahead of confirmation hearings to become the Secretary of Defense, Hegseth disclosed he received a $348,000 advance from HarperCollins for the book.

== See also ==
- Political positions of Pete Hegseth
- American Crusade
