= American Crusade =

2020 book by Pete Hegseth

American Crusade: Our Fight to Stay Free
- Author: Pete Hegseth
- Language: English
- Genre: Politics
- Publisher: Center Street
- Publication date: May 19, 2020
- Publication place: United States
- Media type: Print
- Pages: 352
- ISBN: 978-1-5460-9874-4

American Crusade: Our Fight to Stay Free is a book written by American television presenter Pete Hegseth (later the United States Secretary of Defense) published in 2020. In the book, Hegseth calls for an "American crusade", writing against what he believed to be America's enemies including "leftists" and Islam. The book gained sustained attention after Hegseth was nominated to be the Secretary of Defense by US President-elect Donald Trump.

== Publication ==
The 352-page book was published by Center Street on May 19, 2020.

== Contents ==
In the book Hegseth says "leftists" have: "surrounded traditional American patriots on all sides, ready to close in for the kill: killing our founders, killing our flag, and killing capitalism". Hegseth says he believes there are "irreconcilable differences between the Left and the Right in America leading to perpetual conflict that cannot be resolved through the political process". He furthermore calls for an "American crusade"; he says the "hour is late for America. Beyond political success, her fate relies on exorcising the leftist specter dominating education, religion, and culture – a 360-degree holy war for the righteous cause of human freedom". Central to the theme of the "American Crusade" is that there is something called "Americanism", which The Guardian describes as essentially being right-wing populism. Hegseth characterizes "Americanism" in being opposition to forces like feminism, globalism, Marxism and progressivism and says either "Americanism" will prevail or "death" will.

Hegseth describes leftists, progressives and Democrats as the "enemies" of freedom, the American constitution and the United States. Hegseth explicitly rejects democracy in his book, equating it to a leftist demand; "For leftists, calls for 'democracy' represent a complete rejection of our system. Watch how often they use the word," adding: "They hate America, so they hate the Constitution and want to quickly amass 51 percent of the votes to change it". He has also expressed support for election-rigging through gerrymandering, saying "Republican legislatures should draw congressional lines that advantage pro-freedom candidates – and screw Democrats". Regarding violence, Hegseth writes "Our American Crusade is not about literal swords, and our fight is not with guns. Yet."

America is under siege by the scourge of leftism. Our situation is bad, very bad. We are in the fight of our lives for the soul of our country. You might be thinking "Pete, you laid this out in pretty simple terms. Us versus them. America versus the Left. Good versus evil. You're overplaying your hand. It's not that bad." Read on, and think again.

— Excerpt from the American Crusade

Hegseth describes the 2020 presidential election as a clash for "the soul of America", saying "the leftist media and machine hate President Trump – but they hate you just as much, if not more". Hegseth predicted that if Trump lost and Democrats won the 2020 election, "America will decline and die. A national divorce will ensue. Outnumbered freedom lovers will fight back", and the "military and police, both bastions of freedom-loving patriots, will be forced to make a choice. It will not be good. Yes, there will be some form of civil war"; he describes this as a "horrific scenario that nobody wants but would be difficult to avoid". He says the end of the United States Armed Forces, which elsewhere he calls "the only powerful, pro-freedom, pro-Christian, pro-Israel army in the world", will mean that "Communist China will rise – and rule the globe. Europe will formally surrender. Islamists will get nuclear weapons and seek to wipe America and Israel off the map".

He also says that conservatives must "mock, humiliate, intimidate, and crush our leftist opponents" and to "attack first" to deal with a left he equates with "sedition". His book "lays out the strategy we must employ in order to defeat America's internal enemies". Hegseth has described progressives and Democrats as the "enemies" of freedom, the U.S. Constitution, and America. Hegseth has said that victory for America includes the end of globalism, socialism, secularism, environmentalism, Islamism, genderism, (Note: See also: Gender ideology and 2020s anti-LGBTQ movement in the United States) and leftism, the last of which he refers to as a "false religion" and "specter" that views non-believers as "infidels". He has announced his support for American nationalism. Hegseth believes Americans must build a border wall, raise tariffs, learn English and "fight back". He also expresses support for Trump in the book. He advises readers to "Disdain, despise, detest, distrust – pick your d-words" against "almost all" politicians and credentialled experts. He encourages readers to take part in grassroots conservative activism: "The next time conservative views are squelched in your local school, host a free-speech sit-in in your kids' school lobby and make your case. When local businesses declare 'gun free zones,' remember the Second Amendment, carry your legally owned firearm, and dare them to tell you it's not allowed". (Note: For context, see Gun politics in the United States)

Hegseth says "NATO is not an alliance; it's a defense arrangement for Europe, paid for and underwritten by the United States"; he calls for it to be "scrapped and remade in order for freedom to be truly defended". He criticizes Europe for having "allowed itself to be invaded", and says that the continent "chose not to rebuild its militaries, happily suckling off the teat of America's willingness to actually fight and win wars". He says the "defense of Europe is not our problem; been there, done that, twice". He criticized Turkey's membership in NATO, saying Turkish President Recep Tayyip Erdoğan "openly dreams of restoring the Ottoman Empire" and is "an Islamist with Islamist visions for the Middle East". He criticizes US funding for the United Nations, calling it "a fully globalist organization that aggressively advances an anti-American, anti-Israel, and anti-freedom agenda. Here's one set of rules for the United States and Israel, another for everyone else." He compares his support for Israel to the Crusades, saying "We don't want to fight, but, like our fellow Christians a thousand years ago, we must. We need an American crusade." He also states that "if you love those, learn to love the state of Israel". He also criticizes the International Security Assistance Force in Afghanistan, saying that a "running joke of US troops in Afghanistan was that the ISAF patch actually stood for 'I Saw Americans Fighting'". He praises Israeli Prime Minister Benjamin Netanyahu as well as right-wing populist politicians in Europe, writing that "Americanism is alive in the hearts of Brexiters in the United Kingdom who yearn for national sovereignty. Americanism is alive in places such as Poland, which reject the globalist visions of leftist bureaucrats in old Europe."

Hegseth says that Islam "is not a religion of peace, and it never has been", and claims that "all modern Muslim countries are either formal or de facto no-go zones for practicing Christians and Jews". He says Islam was "almost entirely captured and leveraged by Islamists." He claims Islamists plan to demographically, culturally and politically "conquer" Europe and America, allying with secularism to crush "our nation's Judeo-Christian institutions". He says Islamists plan to "seed the West with as many Muslims as possible" and "thanks to their very high birth rates relative to native populations and their strategically insular culture — the sons and daughters of those migrants and refugees multiply in greater numbers than do native citizens." He points to the elections of Muslim public officials in the United Kingdom and the increase of the Muslim population in Europe to predict that the United States will follow the same path without intervention. He claims that "Almost every single Muslim child grows up listening to, and learning to read from, the Quran" and asks the reader to "Contrast this with our secular American schools – in which the Bible is nowhere to be found – and you'll understand why Muslims' worldview is more coherent than ours".

Hegseth says Islamists uphold a principle called "hegira", which he says "refers to the nonviolent capture of a non-Muslim country". He continues by saying "Hegira is a cultural, physical, psychological, political, and eventually religious takeover. History is replete with examples of this; and because history is not over, it's happening in the most inconceivable places right now". He gives the US as an example, where he claims "Radical mosques and schools are allowed to operate. Religious police control certain sections of many towns. Sharia councils dot the underground landscape. Pervasive political correctness prevents dissent against disastrous policies such as open borders and nonassimilation". Hegseth says the UK has been "invaded" by Islam; "The British were invaded, and they didn't even know it. In one generation – absent radical policy change – the United Kingdom will be neither united nor a Western kingdom. The United Kingdom is done for". He also says London, Birmingham, Leeds, Blackburn, Sheffield, Oxford, Luton, Oldham, and Rochdale all now have Muslim mayors. Hegseth criticizes European nations such as Germany, France, Norway, Sweden, and the Netherlands for "disastrous open-borders, pro-migrant policies of the past few decades", adding that they "threw open their doors to Muslim 'refugees' and will never be the same because of it." He calls on countries to limit the immigration of Muslims, saying "Islam itself is not compatible with Western forms of government. On the other hand, countries that want to stay free ... are fighting like hell to block Islam's spread."

He praises the Crusades, which he says began when in "the eleventh century, Christianity in the Mediterranean region, including the holy sites in Jerusalem, was so besieged by Islam that Christians had a stark choice: to wage defensive war or continue to allow Islam's expansion and face existential war at home in Europe". He says the "pope, the Catholic Church, and European Christians chose to fight – and the crusades were born. Pope Urban II urged the faithful to fight the Muslims with his famous battle cry on their lips: 'Deus vult!,' or 'God wills it!'" He continues by saying "Enjoy Western civilization? Freedom? Equal justice under the law? Thank a crusader". He says voting "is a weapon" but it is not enough, and that "We don't want to fight, but, like our fellow Christians one thousand years ago, we must". He predicted that Biden would follow an "anti-Israel and pro-Islamist foreign policy" and claimed Biden would implement "speech codes instead of free speech, bye-bye Second Amendment" and "naked socialism, government-run everything, Common Core education for everyone, a tiny military, and abortion on demand – even postbirth". He accuses social media companies of censoring conservative voices rather than "intolerant jihadists or filthy leftists". He criticizes the Council on American–Islamic Relations, saying groups such the Muslim Brotherhood and CAIR "have advanced the radical mission of Islamism for decades". He also criticizes Senator Bernie Sanders as "a favorite among Muslim Americans due to his support for Palestinian causes and distaste for Israel".

== Reception ==
The contents of the book gained sustained attention in 2024 after US President-elect Donald Trump nominated Hegseth to serve as the United States Secretary of Defense, for which the United States Senate confirmed his nomination in January 2025.

In November 2024, The Guardian published the following in regards to American Crusade: "Hegseth, especially in 2020's American Crusade, depicts Islam as a natural, historic enemy of the west; presents distorted versions of Muslim doctrine in 'great replacement'-style racist conspiracy theories; treats leftists and Muslims as bound together in their efforts to subvert the US; and idolises medieval crusaders. Experts say that Hegseth's view of Islam is riven with falsehoods, misconceptions and far-right conspiracy theories."

== See also ==
- A Letter to Liberals
- American Fascists
- Christian right
- Christian Zionism
- Dominion theology
- Foreign policy of the second Donald Trump administration
- Hillbilly Elegy
- Islamophobia in the United States
- Political positions of Pete Hegseth
- Project 2025
- The War on Warriors
