= Joshua Haymes =

American podcaster and pastor

Joshua K. Haymes is an American podcaster and pastor. He hosts the Reformation Red Pill podcast.

Haymes served as a co-pastor of SOMA Venice, a church within the SOMA church network, from 2020 to 2023. According to Bob Smietana, writing for Religion News Service, Haymes was a "ponytailed hipster church planter with a soul-patch." Haymes helped plant the congregation in March 2020, but as he and the other pastors became Reformed and postmillennial, they decided to close the church. Haymes then moved to Nashville and became a pastoral intern at Pilgrim Hill Reformed Fellowship, a congregation in the Communion of Reformed Evangelical Churches. He now works full-time in media and content creation.

Haymes is an advocate of sphere sovereignty and Christian patriarchy. He is an enthusiastic supporter of United States defense secretary Pete Hegseth, who is a member of his church. According to Jason Wilson, writing for The Guardian, Haymes subscribes to the Great Replacement conspiracy theory. He has stated that slavery is not inherently evil and that all Christians should share the same sentiment.

Bob Smietana includes Haymes in his list of "Jim Crow theobros", and notes that Haymes has claimed that Adolf Hitler was "misunderstood".
