= Shawn Ryan (podcaster) =

American podcaster and Navy SEAL

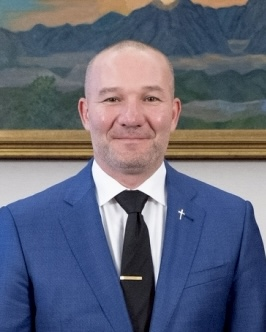
- Ryan at a Taiwanese visit in 2025
- Born: Sean Ryan Palmisano; 1982; Kansas City, Missouri, U.S.
- Military career
- Allegiance: United States
- Branch: United States Navy
- Service years: 2001–2006
- Units: United States Navy SEALs: SEAL Team 2; SEAL Team 8
- Conflicts: Global War on Terror: Iraq War; War in Afghanistan
- Website: shawnryanshow.com

Shawn Ryan (born Sean Ryan Palmisano) is an American podcaster and former U.S. Navy SEAL and Blackwater contractor for the Global Response Staff (GRS), a paramilitary security wing of the CIA. Known for hosting the eponymous Shawn Ryan Show, he is also the founder and CEO of Vigilance Elite, a tactical training company. His podcast, which was one of the top 10 most listened to on Spotify in 2024, features interviews with military personnel, veterans, and public figures.

== Early life ==
Sean Ryan Palmisano grew up in Chillicothe, Missouri, the son of a military pharmacist. He is of quarter-Japanese heritage.

== Military and contracting career ==
Ryan enlisted in the U.S. Navy at the age of 18 and graduated from BUD/S training, achieving the designation of a Navy SEAL, serving with SEAL Teams 2 and 8. Ryan was deployed to Haiti and Baghdad, the latter where he guarded Iraqi politicians. In 2006, he left the Navy, dissatisfied, making a foray into real estate. Ryan became a contractor for the Central Intelligence Agency (CIA) and served with the Global Response Staff of the Counterterrorism Mission Center.

== Post-military career ==
=== Vigilance Elite ===
In December 2015, six months after completing his service as a contractor, Ryan founded Vigilance Elite. The company trains law enforcement and civilians in weapons handling and tactical skills, and is based in Florida. Ryan was inspired to found the company after watching videos of terror attacks and shooting incidents in which bystanders did not know how to react, which motivated him to begin training people for those situations.

To prepare for John Wick: Chapter 3 – Parabellum, actor Keanu Reeves received tactical training from Ryan in areas such as close-quarters combat and room clearing. Footage of their training sessions was published online ahead of the film's release.

=== The Shawn Ryan Show ===
Ryan hosts The Shawn Ryan Show, a podcast produced by Vigilance Elite. The podcast features interviews with military personnel and veterans, with a focus on their experiences of war and life after serving in the military. Guests include journalists, politicians, and business leaders, such as U.S. President Donald Trump, NRF leader Ahmad Massoud, Blackwater founder Erik Prince, and Taiwanese vice president Hsiao Bi-khim. The show was one of the top 10 most listened to podcasts on Spotify in 2024.

In February 2023, the Canadian Special Operations Forces Command issued a cease-and-desist letter demanding Ryan remove an episode featuring former sniper Dallas Alexander over alleged classified footage of a record-breaking long-distance shot. Though CANSOFCOM cited operational security concerns, Ryan and Alexander contended the demand was motivated by the guest's criticism of the military's mandatory COVID-19 vaccine policy. Ryan subsequently re-edited and re-uploaded the episode without the disputed material.

In late 2025 and early 2026, Ryan engaged in a public feud with fellow former Navy SEAL and U.S. Congressman Dan Crenshaw after Ryan accused Crenshaw of insider trading on his podcast. The dispute led to a planned appearance by Crenshaw on the show, which Ryan abruptly canceled in January 2026 over a disagreement regarding guest waiver terms, prompting mutual accusations of bad faith.

=== Public appearances ===
In March 2024, Ryan attended the State of the Union address as a guest of Representative Tim Burchett. He was also interviewed on The Joe Rogan Experience in September 2024.

== Personal life ==
Ryan lives in Tennessee with his family. Ryan is a Catholic, and often discusses his faith on the podcast. He has advocated for psychedelic-assisted therapy for traumatic brain injury and mental health issues.
