= Pete Hegseth =

American government official and television personality (born 1980)

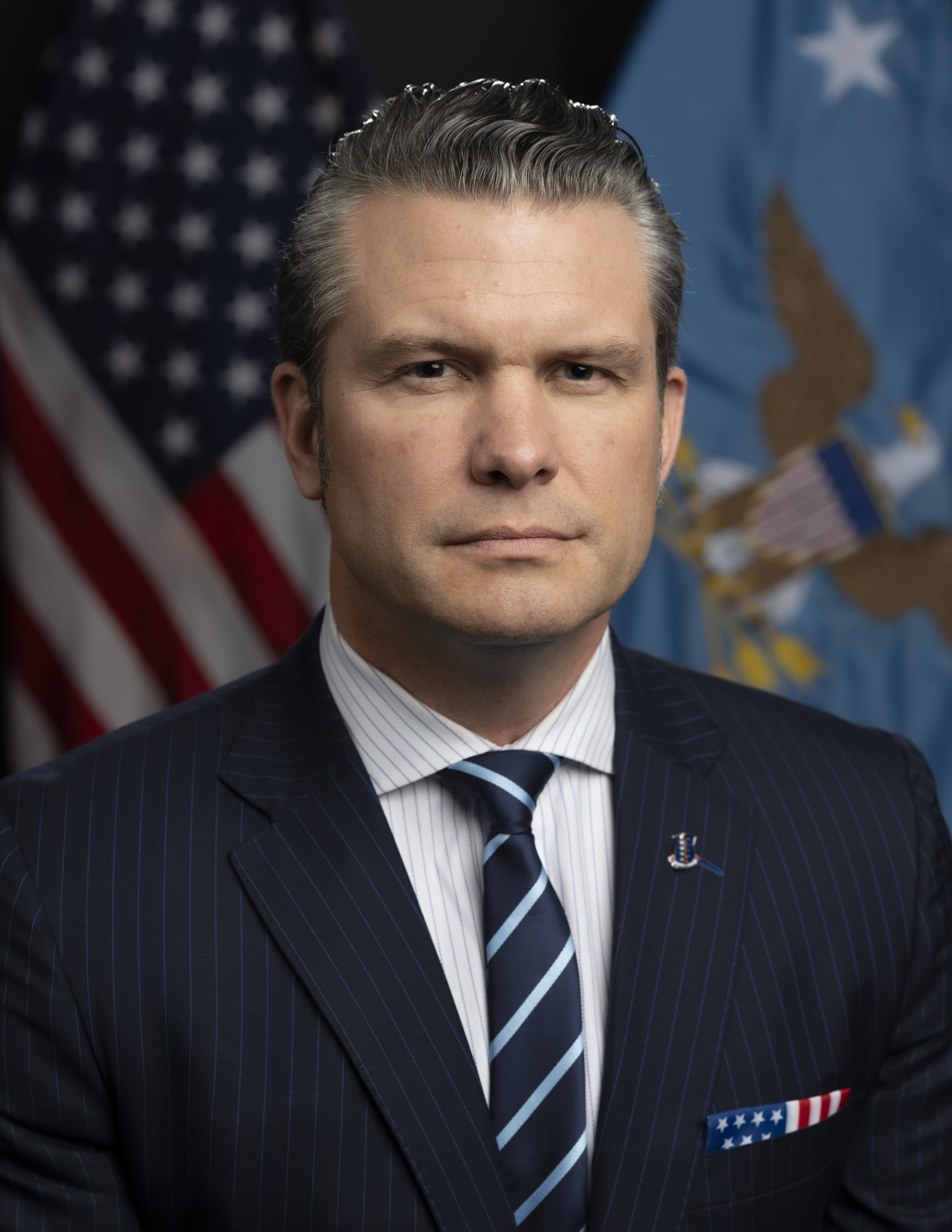
- Official portrait, 2025

29th United States Secretary of Defense (Note: Also known as Secretary of War following President Donald Trump's 2025 executive order authorizing it as a secondary title. However, only an act of Congress can statutorily change the name of his position.)
- Incumbent
- Assumed office January 25, 2025
- President: Donald Trump
- Deputy: Steve Feinberg
- Preceded by: Lloyd Austin

Personal details
- Born: Peter Brian Hegseth; June 6, 1980 (age 46) Minneapolis, Minnesota, U.S.
- Party: Republican
- Spouses: Meredith Schwarz (m. 2004; div. 2009); Samantha Deering (m. 2010; div. 2017); Jennifer Rauchet (m. 2019)
- Children: 4
- Education: Princeton University (BA); Harvard University (MPP)

Military service
- Branch/service: United States Army; Army National Guard
- Years of service: 2003–2006; 2010–2014; 2019–2021
- Rank: Major
- Unit: 3rd Battalion, 187th Infantry Regiment; Minnesota Army National Guard; District of Columbia Army National Guard
- Battles/wars: Iraq War; War in Afghanistan
- Awards: Bronze Star (2); Joint Service Commendation Medal; Army Commendation Medal (2); Combat Infantryman Badge
- Hegseth's voice Hegseth addressing the 2025 United States strikes on Iranian nuclear sites Recorded June 22, 2025

Peter Brian Hegseth (born June 6, 1980) is an American politician, U.S. Army veteran, and former television personality who has been serving as the 29th United States secretary of defense since 2025.

Hegseth studied politics at Princeton University, where he was the publisher of The Princeton Tory, a conservative student newspaper. In 2003, he was commissioned as an infantry officer in the Minnesota Army National Guard, serving at Guantanamo Bay Naval Base and deployed to Iraq and Afghanistan. Hegseth worked for several organizations after leaving Iraq, including as an executive director at Vets For Freedom and Concerned Veterans for America. He became a contributor to Fox News in 2014. Hegseth served as an advisor to President Donald Trump after supporting his campaign in 2016. From 2017 to 2024, Hegseth co-hosted Fox & Friends Weekend. He has written several books, including American Crusade (2020) and The War on Warriors (2024).

In November 2024, then-President-elect Trump named Hegseth as his nominee for secretary of defense. In a Senate Committee on Armed Services hearing days before Trump's second inauguration, Hegseth faced allegations of sexual assault, adultery, financial mismanagement, and excessive drinking. He was confirmed by the Senate that month when Vice President JD Vance cast a tie-breaking vote, the second time in history that a Cabinet nominee's confirmation was decided by a vice president. He took office as the second-youngest defense secretary in history next to Donald Rumsfeld.

Hegseth has drawn criticism during his tenure for actions such as texting war plans in an unsecure group chat on Signal; alleged war crimes related to U.S. military strikes on alleged drug traffickers in the Caribbean Sea; promoting Christianity inside the military; using unmarked military planes for boat strikes; the use of force and rules of engagement in the 2026 Iran war; an unprecedented purge of admirals and generals; and imposing testosterone screening on soldiers. He has received praise from Republican politicians, right-wing political commentators, and Christian nationalist organizations for his role as defense secretary.

== Early life and education ==
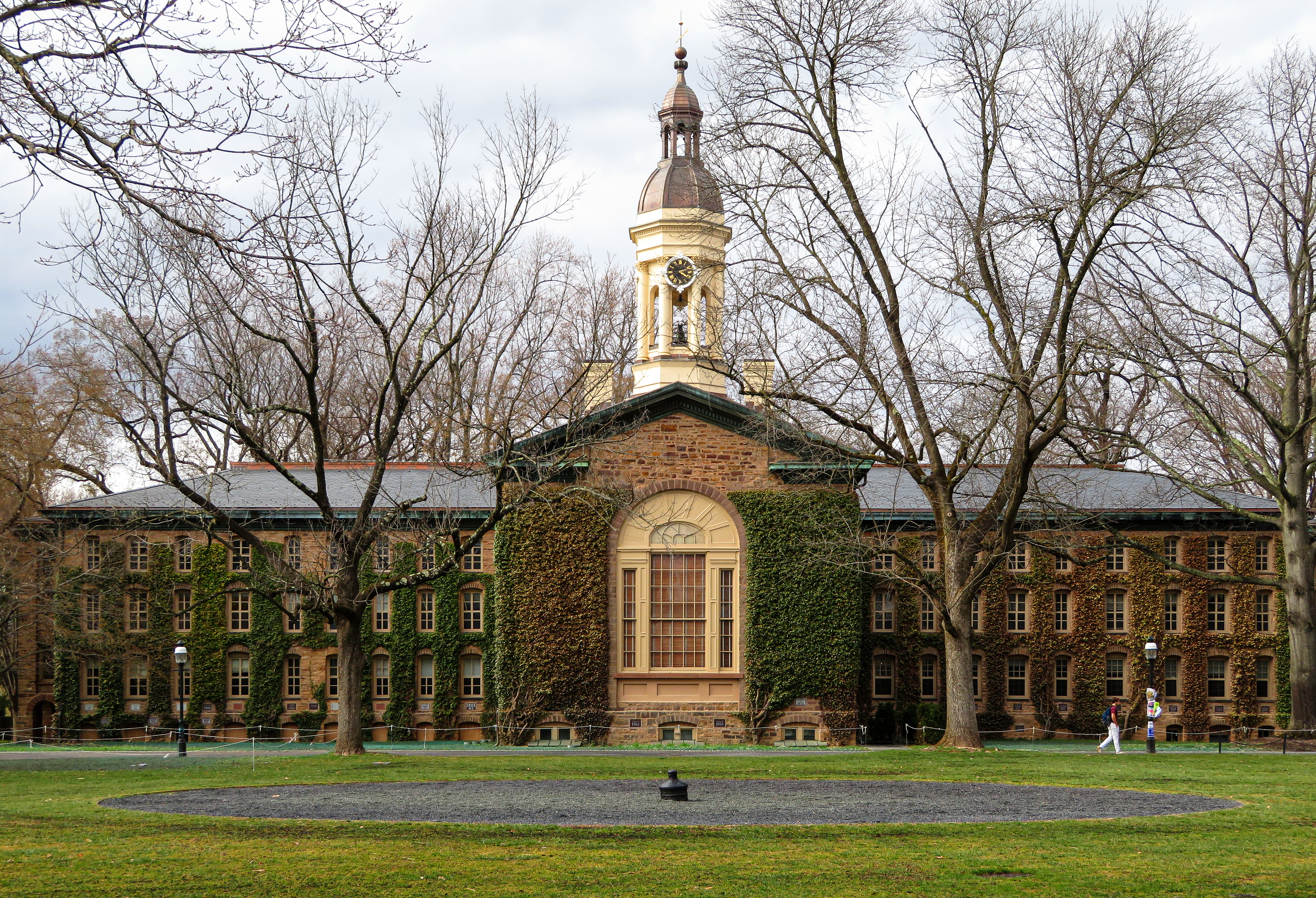
Princeton University, where Hegseth studied (pictured in 2019)

Peter Brian Hegseth was born on June 6, 1980, in Minneapolis, Minnesota. He is of Norwegian descent, as his great-grandparents migrated from Norway to Minnesota before they had children. He was the first of three children of Brian Hegseth and Penelope Haugen. (Note: Brian and Penny had two children after Hegseth: Nate (born 1982/1983) and Philip (born 1992/1993).) Hegseth's father was a basketball coach for high schools across Minnesota before retiring in 2019. Hegseth's mother is an executive business coach who has taught with the Minnesota Excellence in Public Service (MEPS) Series, a fellowship and leadership program for Republican and center-right women. Hegseth was raised in Forest Lake, Minnesota, and attended Forest Lake Area High School. He graduated on June 10, 1999, as valedictorian. Hegseth played on his high school's football team and was a point guard on the basketball team, where he set school records for career three-point shots, single-season three-point shots, and single-season three-point shooting percentage. He was named all-conference twice and earned all-state honors as a senior.

After high school, Hegseth enrolled at Princeton University, where he graduated with a Bachelor of Arts in politics in 2003. According to Reserve & National Guard Magazine, he chose Princeton over an offer from the United States Military Academy to play for the school's basketball team. Months before the September 11 attacks, Hegseth joined the Reserve Officers' Training Corps. During his years at Princeton, Hegseth was the publisher and editor-in-chief of The Princeton Tory, the school's conservative student newspaper.

In April 2002, Hegseth declared that, as publisher of The Princeton Tory, he would "defend the pillars of Western civilization against the distractions of diversity". The editors of The Princeton Tory criticized Halle Berry for accepting the Academy Award for Best Actress for her performance in Monster's Ball (2001) "on behalf of an entire race", and The New York Times for announcing that it would print gay marriage announcements, arguing that it would justify publishing marriage announcements for incestuous, zoophilic, and pedophilic relationships. In October, The Princeton Tory published an editorial calling homosexuality immoral. In response, the president of Princeton's student government, Nina Langsam, wrote a strongly worded email to Hegseth and The Princeton Tory's publisher, Brad Simmons. Her email was published in the following issue.

== Career ==
=== Military service (2003–2006, 2010–2014, 2019–2021) ===
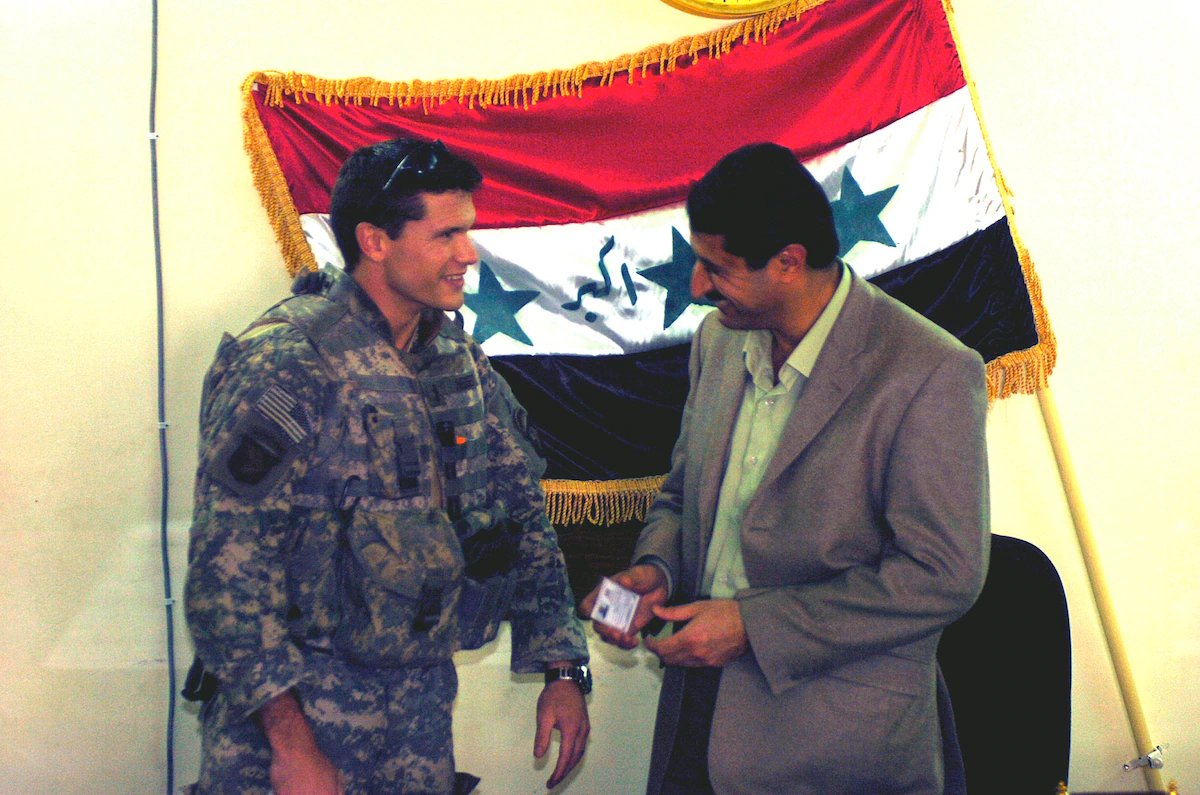
Hegseth meeting with Mahmood Kalaf Ahmed, the mayor of Samarra, in 2005

After graduating from Princeton in 2003, Hegseth was commissioned as a second lieutenant in the United States Army through the university's Reserve Officers' Training Corps program. He briefly worked as an equity-markets analyst at Bear Stearns. Hegseth completed his basic training at Fort Benning in Columbus, Georgia, in 2004, and for 11 months he was a Minnesota Army National Guardsman at Guantanamo Bay detention camp. There, he led a platoon of soldiers from the New Jersey Army National Guard guarding detainees. By July 2005, he had returned to Bear Stearns; shortly thereafter, he volunteered in the Iraq War as an infantry officer, where he received a Bronze Star Medal. Hegseth served in the 3rd Battalion, 187th Infantry Regiment in the 101st Airborne Division, led by Colonel Michael D. Steele. He began his tour in Baghdad before moving to Samarra, where he served as a civil affairs officer, working with the city council and forming an alliance with council member Asaad Ali Yaseen. Hegseth has described a near-death experience in Iraq in which a rocket-propelled grenade hit his vehicle but failed to detonate.

In 2010, Hegseth deployed with the Minnesota Army National Guard as a counterinsurgency instructor. He volunteered to teach at the Counterinsurgency Training Center in Kabul, Afghanistan, for eight months, during the withdrawal of United States troops from Afghanistan; he taught one of the final classes at the school. After completing his tour in 2014, he was promoted to major and assigned to the Individual Ready Reserve. Through the reserve, he joined the District of Columbia Army National Guard in June 2019 as a traditional drilling service member, remaining in duty until March 2021. He was barred from serving on duty at the inauguration of Joe Biden after a guardsman flagged Hegseth as an "insider threat", noting a tattoo on his biceps of the words Deus vult. He left the Individual Ready Reserve in January 2024, writing in his book The War on Warriors (2024) that he resigned over the incident.

=== Political activism (2006–2016) ===
Hegseth watches as President George W. Bush delivers a statement on the Global War on Terror in the Rose Garden, July 2007

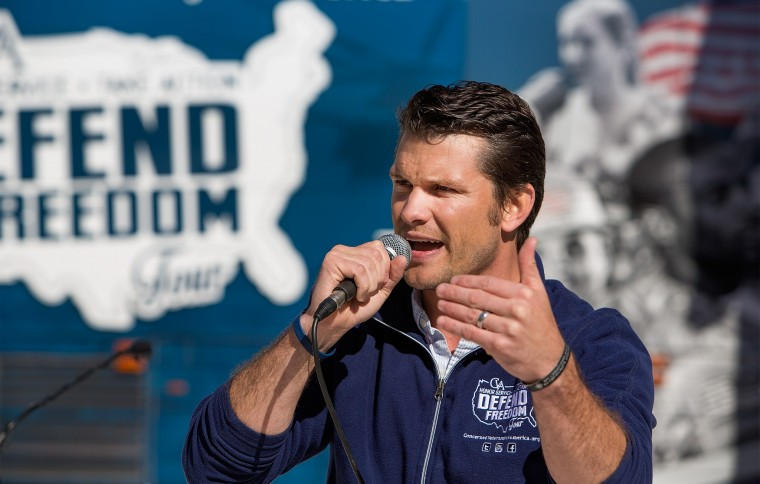
Hegseth speaking at the Defend Freedom Tour in 2013

By August 2006, Hegseth moved to Manhattan and began working at the Manhattan Institute for Policy Research, where he met a marine who was working for Vets for Freedom, a political advocacy organization. He began working for Vets for Freedom in 2006 as an unpaid director; by 2007, he was working full-time as an executive director, and by 2008, he became the organization's president. In May 2007, Hegseth appeared at a presidential campaign fundraiser for John McCain. In the months leading up to the 2008 United States presidential election, Vets for Freedom began supporting McCain. As the group's chairman, he criticized Democratic nominee Barack Obama for supporting "a dangerous policy of irreversible withdrawal." By January 2009, Vets for Freedom had accrued hundreds of thousands of dollars in unpaid bills, leading to an internal campaign to oust Hegseth. The group merged with Military Families United, and he was removed from leadership by 2011.

After returning to Minnesota in February 2012, Hegseth decided to enter the Republican primary for the United States Senate election in Minnesota and had selected a campaign manager, Anne Neu Brindley. By April, his campaign had raised US$160,000. Hegseth lost to Kurt Bills in the Republican convention in May, and ended his candidacy days later. He founded MN PAC to support similar candidates, though a third of the organization's funds went to parties for personal friends and family. Hegseth began working as president of Concerned Veterans of America, a group funded by the Koch brothers, that year. The group criticized President Obama for the 2014 Veterans Health Administration controversy. Hegseth enrolled in the Harvard Kennedy School in 2009, but completed just one semester; he graduated in 2013 with a degree in public policy. In 2022, to protest the offering of classes in critical race theory at Harvard University, he reportedly wrote "Return to sender" on his degree and sent it back to the university.

Hegseth left Concerned Veterans for America in January 2016 after allegations of financial mismanagement and alcoholism. A whistleblower report accused Hegseth of fostering a sexist and hostile workplace at Concerned Veterans for America; one whistleblower claimed that Hegseth had used organization funds as a personal expense account. Another former employee claimed he had witnessed Hegseth drunkenly chanting "Kill all Muslims!" In December, President-elect Donald Trump considered Hegseth for secretary of veterans affairs, but he faced opposition from veterans groups who viewed Hegseth's support for allowing all veterans to choose private doctors as untenable; Paul Rieckhoff, the executive director of Iraq and Afghanistan Veterans of America, said that selecting Hegseth would "be war" and "a radical departure" for the department. Trump later chose David Shulkin, with The Washington Post noting Hegseth's lack of experience in operating a large organization. Hegseth told podcaster Shawn Ryan that Trump found him too young to assume the position. After Shulkin fell out of favor with the Trump administration in March 2018, Hegseth positioned himself as a potential candidate, but Trump selected Robert Wilkie after consulting Hegseth and financier Isaac Perlmutter.

=== Fox News (2014–2024) ===
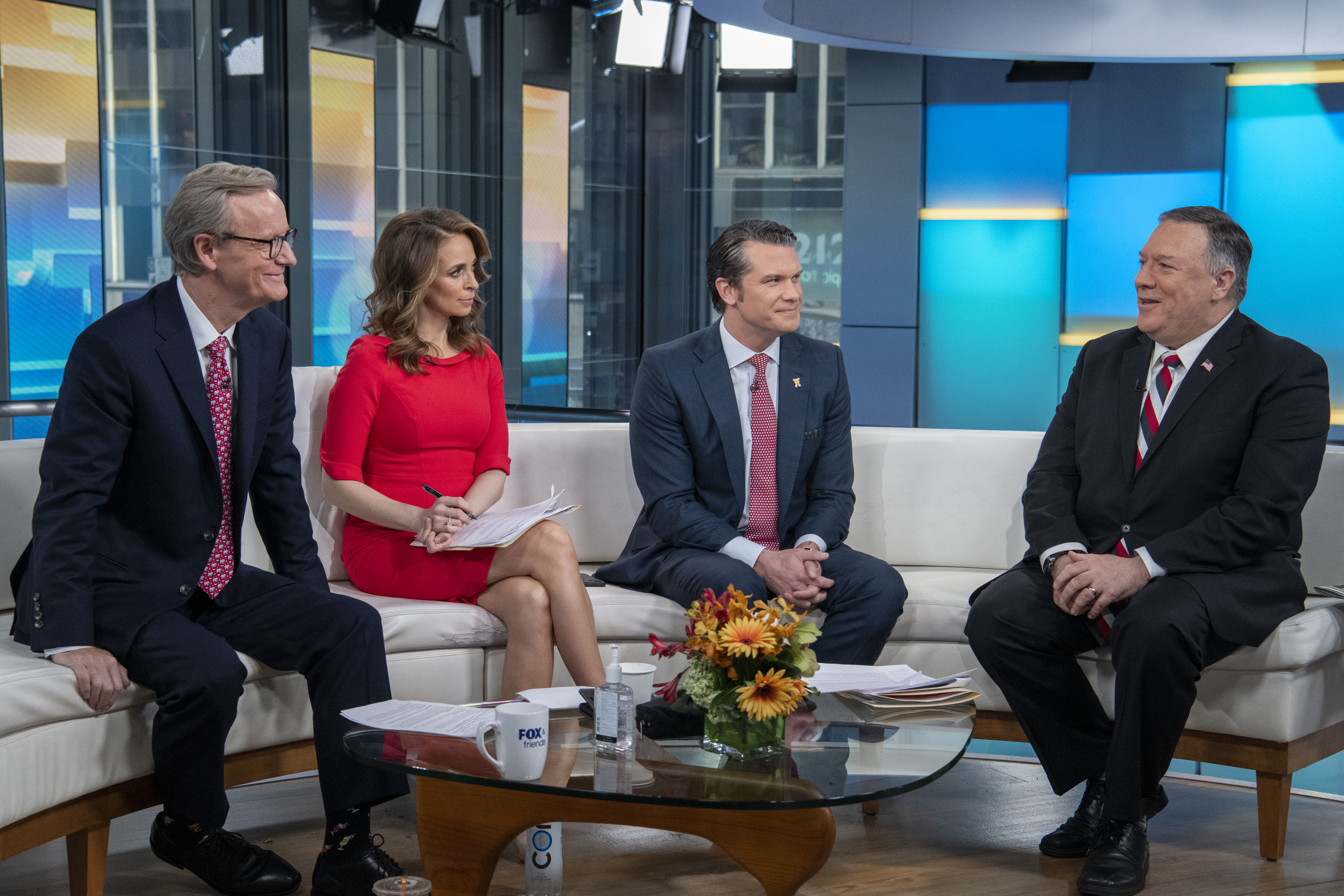
Hegseth interviewing Secretary of State Mike Pompeo on Fox & Friends in March 2020

By June 2014, Hegseth was given a position as a regular contributor to Fox News by the network's executive, Roger Ailes. In 2016, he was briefly a host on TheBlaze before regularly hosting Fox & Friends Weekend that year after Ailes's resignation, becoming an official co-host in January 2017. According to a Fox News executive in Hoax (2020), Jennifer Rauchet, a producer of Fox & Friends Weekend who later married him, "was favoring Pete with airtime" and "kept putting Pete on TV." Hegseth served as a temporary host for Laura Ingraham on The Ingraham Angle in an effort by the network to promote other staffers; the change occurred during the boycott of The Ingraham Angle after comments Ingraham made about David Hogg, an activist and survivor of the Parkland high school shooting. He hosted All-American New Year (2018) with commentator Lisa Kennedy.

Hegseth's opinions expressed on Fox & Friends influenced Trump's policymaking in his first term. In October 2018, as a migrant caravan began traveling to the United States, Trump claimed that "unknown Middle Easterners" had infiltrated the caravan. Trump apparently cited a comment that Hegseth had made on Fox & Friends, though Hegseth said he had not verified his statement's accuracy. Hegseth had apparently based his claim on a statement Guatemalan president Jimmy Morales made after capturing 100 ISIS fighters in the country. In negotiations to avert a federal government shutdown, Democrats neared a deal until Hegseth urged Trump not to support a deal that did not include US$5 billion for his border wall. Trump repeated claims Hegseth had made correlating video games with mass shootings after two mass shootings in El Paso and in Dayton in August 2019. Hegseth said he had spoken to Trump about pardoning war criminal Clint Lorance and accused murderer Mathew L. Golsteyn, as well as reversing the demotion of Eddie Gallagher.

At Fox News, Hegseth was the subject of multiple lawsuits. In 2015, he threw an axe during a Flag Day event in New York City, accidentally hitting a drummer from the United States Military Academy. Video of the incident circulated widely online. The drummer, Jeff Prosperie, alleged that he had suffered "severe and serious personal injuries to his mind and body" and "permanent effects of pain, disability, disfigurement and loss of body function." Prosperie sued Hegseth three years later in 2018, and the suit was resolved in 2019. In Dominion Voting Systems v. Fox News Network (2023), Dominion Voting Systems included a segment of Fox & Friends Weekend featuring Hegseth with co-hosts Will Cain and Rachel Campos-Duffy, in which they did not reject claims by Rudy Giuliani that the company's voting machines facilitated voting fraud in the 2020 presidential election.

Hegseth was chosen among Fox News's hosts to be featured on Fox Nation, the network's streaming service. To promote the service, he co-hosted a one-hour special, Fox Nation First Look, with Jesse Watters, Tomi Lahren, Britt McHenry, and Tyrus. On Fox Nation, Hegseth hosted The Miseducation of America (2022–2023), a television program criticizing "the Left's educational agenda". He also hosted the series Battle in the Holy Land (2019–2023), The Life of Jesus (2022–2023), and the special Battle in Bethlehem (2019), on the service.

== Secretary of Defense (2025–present) ==
=== Nomination and confirmation ===
Hegseth testifying at his confirmation hearing before the Senate Committee on Armed Services on January 14, 2025

On November 12, 2024, President-elect Donald Trump named Hegseth as his nominee for secretary of defense, after Arkansas Senator Tom Cotton announced he would not serve as secretary. Hegseth subsequently ended his contract with Fox News. The selection of Hegseth was seen as a sign that Trump sought to appoint a loyalist to lead the Department of Defense, (Note: Attributed to multiple references:) and his relative lack of experience surprised officials in the department. (Note: Attributed to multiple references:) According to Vanity Fair, Trump's transition team became aware the following day of a sexual assault allegation involving Hegseth that occurred in Monterey, California, seven years earlier; The Washington Post reported that senior officials on the team were surprised by the allegation and reconsidered his nomination. Despite the allegation, Trump defended Hegseth and several republican senators indicated that they would support him. His nomination was threatened by an article from Jane Mayer in The New Yorker detailing alleged financial mismanagement and alcohol issues while leading his veterans' groups, while an NBC News article reported that his drinking habits concerned his colleagues at Fox News; The New York Times reported in December that Trump had begun to consider Florida governor Ron DeSantis as an alternative.

In an effort to retain his nomination amid controversies, Hegseth began a campaign that month. Advisors to Trump privately sought to persuade him to support Hegseth in fear that it would embolden recalcitrant republican senators, while he could not garner support for DeSantis, according to The New York Times. In addition, the Times reported that Vice President-elect JD Vance had led a group of republicans, including Donald Trump Jr., former Trump aide Steve Bannon, political activist Charlie Kirk, and Breitbart News reporter Matt Boyle, to support Hegseth's nomination. Trump allies took a direct approach to addressing the controversies, including an interview with Megyn Kelly that impressed Trump. Hegseth appeared at the United States Capitol in December; Trump publicly reaffirmed his support for Hegseth afterwards. The visit gave Iowa Senator Joni Ernst, who had threatened his nomination, a positive impression of Hegseth.

Hegseth appeared before the Senate Committee on Armed Services on January 14. He positioned himself as a "warrior" while denying the allegations and his previous claims that women should not serve in combat roles. Hegseth was criticized by democrats over allegations of sexual misconduct, financial mismanagement, and alcohol issues. Rhode Island senator Jack Reed, the committee's ranking member, noted that Hegseth had used the term "jagoff" in his book The War on Warriors (2024) to derogatorily refer to a Judge Advocate General officer who reprimanded him on the use of rocket-propelled grenades. He did not answer a question from Virginia Senator Tim Kaine on whether or not sexual assault, drinking, or infidelity were disqualifying. The Committee on Armed Services voted to advance his nomination 14–13 along party lines on January 20, after Trump was inaugurated. Hegseth's former sister-in-law, Danielle, sent an affidavit to senators alleging that he was abusive to his second wife, Samantha, and that he had issues with over-consumption of alcohol. Hegseth denied having a drinking problem and pledged not to drink if confirmed.

On January 24, Hegseth was confirmed by the Senate in a 51–50 vote. Every republican senator, with the exception of Susan Collins, Lisa Murkowski, and Mitch McConnell, voted to confirm him, while every Democratic senator opposed his nomination, leading to a 50–50 vote. Vance cast a tie-breaking vote to confirm Hegseth. His confirmation was threatened by Senator Thom Tillis, who told Senate majority leader John Thune the day before that he would not vote for Hegseth because of the sexual-assault allegations. Persuaded by Vance, Tillis expressed support for Hegseth on X minutes before the vote. His confirmation was the second in U.S. history to be decided by a vice president, after Betsy DeVos's confirmation for secretary of education in 2017. He was the second-youngest person to hold the post, after Donald Rumsfeld, who first occupied the position in the Ford administration.

=== Initial actions ===
Hegseth being sworn in as secretary of defense by vice president JD Vance on January 25, 2025

Vance swore in Hegseth as defense secretary on January 25. Hegseth declared that he would have several priorities for the Defense Department, including to "revive the warrior ethos", restore trust in the military, redevelop the nation's industrial base, ease the department's process to purchase weaponry, defend the US domestically, engage with Indo-Pacific to deter China, and support Trump's effort to "end wars responsibly"—including the Russo-Ukrainian War and the Middle Eastern crisis. In a call to Israeli prime minister Benjamin Netanyahu a day after being sworn in, Hegseth said that the United States was "fully committed" to the security of Israel.

Hegseth revoked the security clearance and detail of Mark Milley, the former chairman of the Joint Chiefs of Staff and chief of staff of the Army who later became a critic of Trump, and ordered an inspector general inquiry into Milley's tenure as chairman of the Joint Chiefs of Staff; the inspector general of the Department of Defense, Robert Storch, was removed from his position when Trump dismissed several inspectors general. According to The Washington Post, the Department of Defense Education Activity began removing certain books on immigration and sexuality.

Hegseth visited the Mexico–United States border with Tom Homan, Trump's border czar, in El Paso, Texas, in February, where he stated that the federal government intended to gain complete "operational control of the southern border". He renamed Fort Liberty to Fort Bragg, its original name honoring the Confederate general Braxton Bragg. The military base was now ostensibly renamed for Roland L. Bragg, a previously obscure soldier who served in World War II. In a meeting before the Ukraine Defense Contact Group at NATO headquarters, he opposed NATO membership for Ukraine and said that returning Ukraine's borders prior to the annexation of Crimea by Russia was "unrealistic". The Department of Defense invited Jack Posobiec, an alt-right political activist to accompany Hegseth, according to The Washington Post. Hegseth moderated his comments the following day, stating that it would be possible for Ukraine to join NATO given Trump's discretion.

In February 2025, Hegseth ordered officials within the Department of Defense to reduce funding on most initiatives and began a purge from within the department, firing three top judge advocate generals and Lisa Franchetti, the chief of naval operations. Hegseth stated that "we want lawyers who give sound constitutional advice" rather than "roadblocks to anything". In March, he ordered US Cyber Command to halt offensive operations against Russia, in an apparent effort to encourage Russian president Vladimir Putin to negotiate an end to the Russo-Ukrainian War. Also that month, the Defense Department canceled 91 of its research studies, including those on climate change impacts and social trends, while Hegseth later stated that the Defense Department "does not do climate change crap." Separately, the Trump administration instructed Hegseth to "immediately" present "credible military options to ensure fair and unfettered US military and commercial access to the Panama Canal".

=== Information disclosures and use of Signal ===
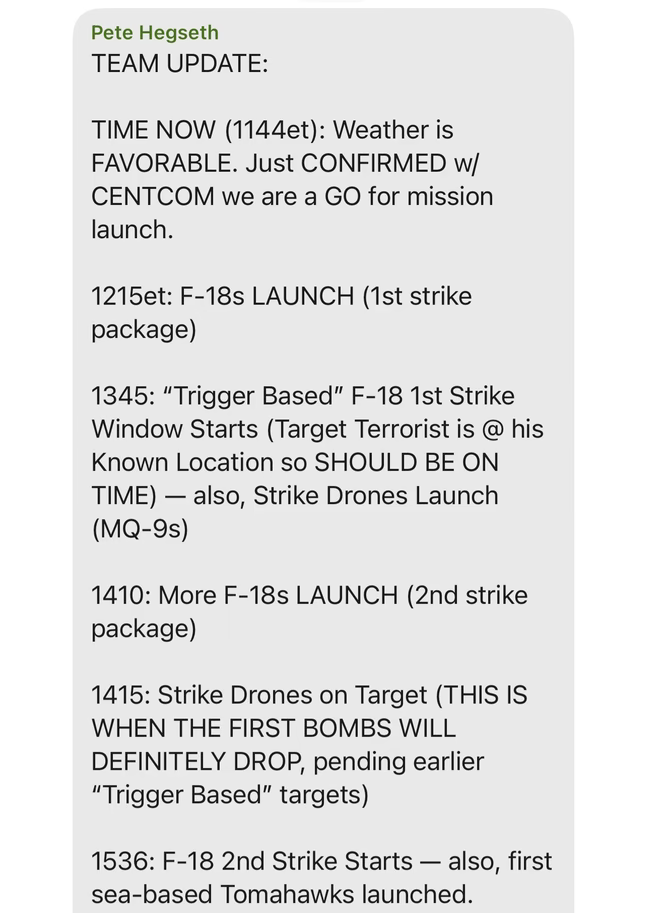

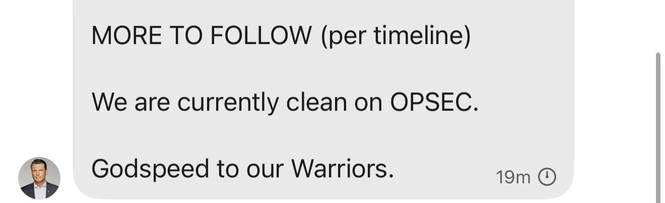
Screenshots from the leaked Signal chat showing Pete Hegseth discussing plans for the March–May 2025 United States attacks in Yemen

In March 2025, Jeffrey Goldberg, the editor-in-chief of The Atlantic, reported that he had been accidentally included by Mike Waltz in a Signal group chat where Hegseth shared information about attacks in Yemen hours before they occurred. The discussions involved US officials, including Vance and secretary of state Marco Rubio. According to The New York Times, several officials with the Department of Defense expressed shock at the incident, while various former national security officials noted the potential for espionage amid ongoing efforts by China to obtain telecommunications records. A spokesperson for the National Security Council confirmed Goldberg's report and the authenticity of the messages. Hegseth rejected that war plans were shared and called Goldberg "deceitful" and a "discredited so-called journalist". Director of National Intelligence Tulsi Gabbard said no classified information was shared and CIA director John Ratcliffe said Signal was authorized for the group chat.

The incident distressed Hegseth, who threatened to use a polygraph on Christopher W. Grady, the acting chairman of the Joint Chiefs of Staff. Goldberg later published most of the Signal chat. The chat showed that Hegseth posted information including the launch times of F-18 aircraft, MQ-9 drones and Tomahawk missiles, as well as the time when the F-18 aircraft would reach their targets, and the time when the bombs would land. Hegseth commented on the chat, writing that there were: "No names. No targets. No locations. No units. No routes. No sources. No methods. And no classified information". The incident led to criticism from both Republicans and Democrats. After the Signal leak, media outlet Der Spiegel searched the Internet using a commercial information provider and password leaks, which revealed Hegseth's personal mobile number, personal email address and its password, and WhatsApp account.

The Wall Street Journal reported that Hegseth had brought his wife to two meetings with foreign defense officials in which sensitive information was discussed, one meeting in February, at Brussels, with NATO officials, and the other in March, at the Pentagon, with British Defense Secretary John Healey. Meanwhile, the Associated Press reported in March that Hegseth's brother, Phil, was listed by the Trump administration as a senior adviser to Hegseth, accompanying Hegseth to meetings, including in Congress, and on official foreign trips. Phil, who previously worked in podcasting and media relations, was confirmed by Hegseth's office to be working in the Pentagon as a Department of Homeland Security liaison to the Department of Defense. That month, The Washington Post detailed a memorandum written by Hegseth orienting the department towards deterring a potential invasion of Taiwan and supporting homeland defense by "assuming risk" in Europe. The document contained passages that were identical to those present in Project 2025.

According to The Washington Post, Hegseth had Signal installed on his computer to circumvent cellular communication issues and to more easily communicate with other Trump officials. CNN later reported that Ricky Buria, a former aide to secretary of defense Lloyd Austin, had set up Signal on Hegseth's computer. According to the Associated Press, the computer was on an unsecured internet line that was not using one of the Department of Defense's IP addresses. In April, the Department of Defense Office of Inspector General announced an inquiry into Hegseth's disclosure of classified information in the Signal chat. That month, The New York Times reported that Hegseth had shared details on the attack in a second Signal chat with his wife, brother, and personal lawyer. At the White House Easter Egg Roll, Hegseth suggested that the revelations were a coordinated smear campaign. John Ullyot, the former spokesman for the Department of Defense, wrote in a Politico Magazine opinion piece hours later that the department was in a "full-blown meltdown" and warned that Hegseth was at risk of losing his position.

According to NPR, the White House began looking for a secretary of defense to replace Hegseth the following day. Nonetheless, he retained support from Trump, who privately did not seek to relitigate a grueling Senate confirmation, enjoyed Hegseth's presence and appearance on television, and believed that firing him would lead to questions over Waltz's retention, while he publicly associated the controversy to "disgruntled employees" and boasted of Hegseth's work. Karoline Leavitt, the White House press secretary, stated that "the entire Pentagon is working against" Hegseth. Representative Don Bacon became the first Republican House member to urge that Hegseth be fired. At least five political appointees within the Department of Defense resigned by April 24. That day, Joe Kesper, Hegseth's chief of staff, resigned, but stated that he would remain at the department as a special government employee. The firings and resignations led to a crisis within the Department of Defense that was described as a "free-for-all" by one employee who spoke to Politico.

=== 2025 Quantico senior leadership meeting ===
In September 2025, Hegseth called over 800 generals and admirals from across the world for a rare and urgent meeting at Marine Corps Base Quantico, Virginia. The Washington Post reported the meeting came on short notice and without a stated reason, sparking "confusion and alarm".

On September 30, Hegseth addressed gathered leadership with a campaign-style rally, complaining of "woke" policies about diversity or investigations into hazing and restrictive rules of engagement. ABC News described the speech as "extraordinarily blunt", with Hegseth assailing "gender illusions" and promoting a "warrior ethos". Hegseth announced raising physical fitness and grooming standards to a "male level" and removing "fat generals" and "beardos"; announced an overhaul to the Office of Inspector General, saying it had been weaponized to put "complainers, ideologues and poor performers in the driver's seat"; and falsely stated that there had been a mandate for "racial quotas". Hegseth encouraged those gathered to resign if they disagreed with his changes. Following Hegseth, President Trump gave a speech praising his accomplishments and stated the military should engage in domestic deployments as "training grounds". The New York Times reported that officers remained "stone-faced" to maintain neutrality and that many privately said they found the speech insulting.

=== Caribbean boat strikes ===
Unclassified footage of the first airstrike

On November 28, 2025, The Washington Post published an article alleging Hegseth had given a spoken order to kill the survivors of a September 2, 2025, strike led by SEAL Team 6 on a boat suspected of carrying drugs in the Caribbean Sea. The operation was overseen by Admiral Frank M. "Mitch" Bradley, from Fort Bragg in North Carolina. Bradley described the survivors as legitimate targets, as they could theoretically have contacted other traffickers to rescue them and their cargo, and subsequently ordered the second strike to complete Hegseth's order that everyone must be killed. Hegseth's explanation for the strike has shifted over time. The Office of Legal Counsel eventually argued that the strike was legal because its goal was to destroy the boat, not to kill the crew, reflecting a secret legal memo endorsing such strikes; the memo has been "fiercely criticized" by legal experts. The strike was the first in a series of strikes against suspected drug traffickers. Hegseth's alleged orders were characterized by several legal experts as murder and a war crime.

The alleged orders were condemned by members of congress, including Representative Seth Moulton, who said "Mark my words: It may take some time, but Americans will be prosecuted for this, either as a war crime or outright murder." Both Senators Tim Kaine and Mark Kelly described the alleged orders as a war crime. Representative Mike Turner stated that "Obviously if that occurred, that would be very serious, and I agree that that would be an illegal act." On November 28, 2025, Senator Roger Wicker, chairman of the Senate Armed Services Committee wrote in a statement that the committee had directed inquiries about the orders to the defense department, and "we will be conducting vigorous oversight to determine the facts related to these circumstances." Hegseth subsequently defended his actions, writing on X that "As usual, the fake news is delivering more fabricated, inflammatory, and derogatory reporting to discredit our incredible warriors fighting to protect the homeland."

=== Removal of Anthropic AI ===
The Defense Secretary threatened Anthropic, the owner of Claude AI (the only AI authorized by the Department of Defense in early 2026), to designate the company a supply chain risk and force the company to eliminate its restrictions on the use of its AI by the Defense Department or he will use the Defense Production Act to compel them. The Defense Department gave Anthropic a deadline of February 27, 2026. The contract Sec. Hegseth wanted to cancel was worth $200 million. A senior defense official stated that the company will "pay a price for forcing our hand like this." Anthropic stated that they wanted assurances that the DoD would not use their AI tools to spy on Americans or develop weapons that could fire without human involvement. The Defense Department also stated in February 2026 that Grok, OpenAI and Google were close to being approved for use. Claude was used by the Pentagon during their January 2026 operation to capture Nicolas Maduro. In May 2026, the Defense Department announced AI use deals with SpaceX, OpenAI, Google, NVIDIA, Reflection, Microsoft and Amazon Web Services.

On February 27, 2026, Hegseth used the Federal Acquisition Supply Chain Security Act to declare Anthropic a supply chain risk and excluded it from all federal contracts. President Trump also stated that every federal agency must stop using Anthropic's AI technology. ChatGPT signed a deal with the Defense Department the same day but their CEO Sam Altman said, "the AI system shall not be intentionally used for domestic surveillance of U.S. persons and nationals." On March 6, 2026, Anthropic's CEO Dario Amodei stated that his company will challenge the DoD in court. Anthropic's partners, including Microsoft, Amazon and Google stated their agreement with Amodei. On March 8, 2026, OpenAI (the parent company of ChatGPT) announced that their head of robotics, Caitlin Kalinowski, had resigned stating, "surveillance of Americans without judicial oversight and lethal autonomy without human authorization are lines that deserved more deliberation than they got."

=== 2026 Iran war ===
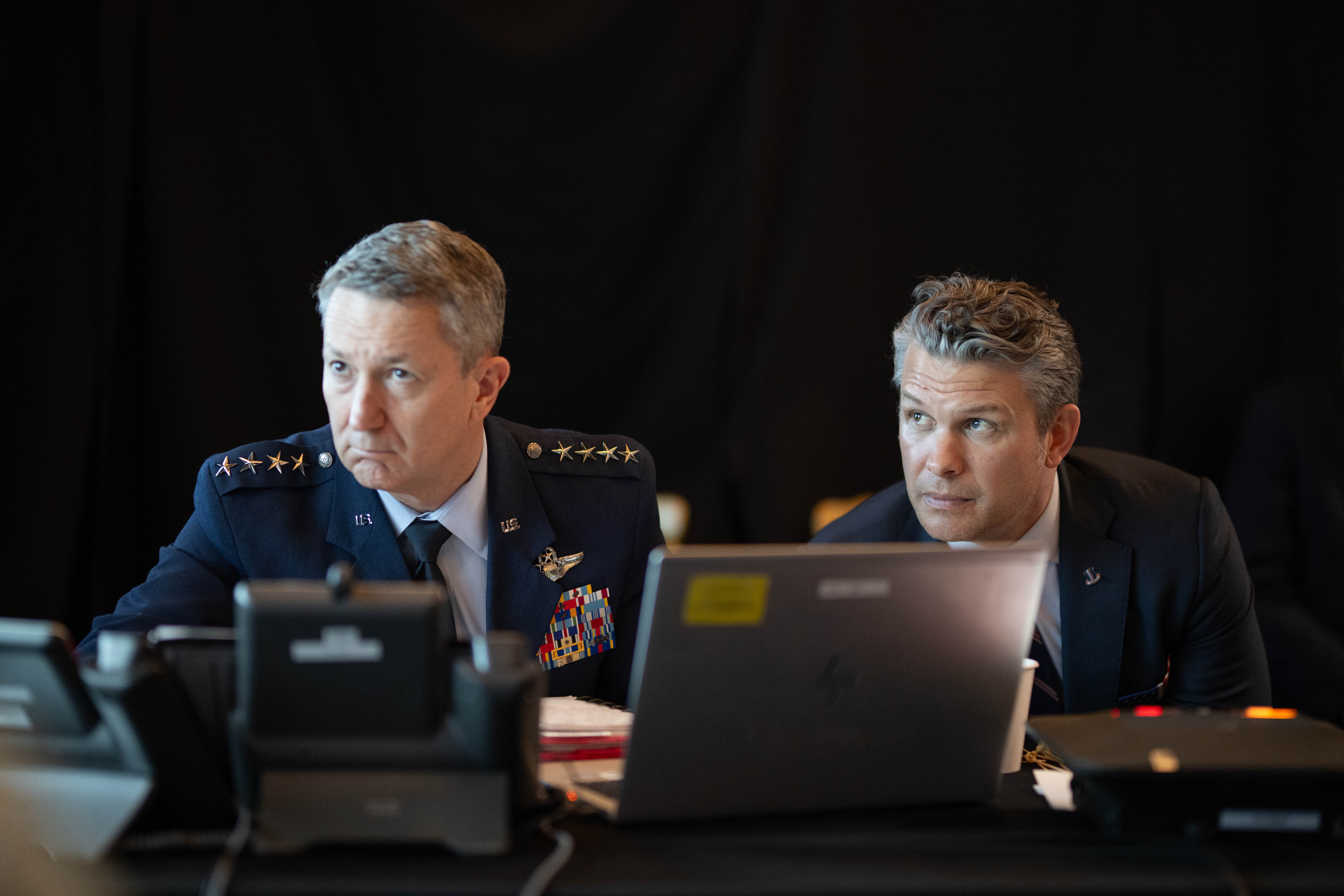
Hegseth and General Dan Caine listen as President Trump oversees Operation Epic Fury

On March 2, 2026, Hegseth stated that joint U.S.-Israeli military operations against Iran were a response to prolonged Iranian targeting of American interests. He characterized the actions as an effort to conclude an existing conflict, stating, "We didn't start this war but under President Trump we're finishing it." He noted the death of Supreme Leader Ali Khamenei during the strikes, remarking, "This is not a so-called regime change war, but the regime sure did change". He stated that the primary goals were to "destroy the missile threats, destroy the navy," and ensure there are "no nukes". During the briefing, he issued a direct warning to adversaries: "If you kill or threaten Americans anywhere in the world... we will hunt you down, and we will kill you". He further stated that there would be "no stupid rules of engagement," "no politically correct wars," and "no nation-building quagmire."

Hegseth stated on March 4, 2026, that the Pentagon was "investigating" reports of a deadly airstrike on the Shajareh Tayyebeh girls' school in Minab, Iran, while maintaining that the U.S. military "never targets civilian sites." Evidence indicated that it was the U.S. which most likely bombed the school.

On March 10, 2026, Hegseth accused Iran of firing missiles from schools and hospitals and endangering civilians. He also said that Iran is "badly losing" on day 10 of the war.

During a congressional hearing on April 30, Hegseth called Democrats and critics of the Iran war the "biggest adversary" facing the United States and stated the War Powers Resolution did not apply due to a temporary ceasefire. On September 30, Hegseth accused "anti-American losers in our media" of helping Iran by spreading negative coverage of the war, and accused them of treason.

=== Military leadership, resignations, and removals ===
As defense secretary, Hegseth has undertaken an unprecedented purge of senior leadership with little explanation and often against the advice of top military leaders. As of September 2026, more than 20 generals, admirals, or civilian leaders have been forced out or have resigned, and more had their promotions blocked. Over 80 generals and admirals have been impacted in total, amounting to 10% of the military's top officers. The NAACP, National Women's Law Center, and other civil rights groups have accused Hegseth of blocking the promotions of black people and women. The New York Times has reported the "purge does not appear to be driven by job performance, but rather is part of a broader effort by the defense secretary to fashion a force, particularly at senior levels, that is aligned with his political and ideological views, according to military officials".

In February 2025, Hegseth relieved Chief of Naval Operations Adm. Lisa Franchetti. In April 2026, Hegseth asked Army Chief of Staff Gen. Randy George to step down and retire. The removals of Franchetti and George caused the longest breaks without a Senate-confirmed service chief in Army and Navy history. On August 31, 2026, Secretary of the Army Dan Driscoll gave Hegseth his resignation after a face to face meeting Driscoll had with President Trump where he stated his concerns over the number of army generals fired under Hegseth. On September 30, Hegseth announced a 20% reduction of admirals and generals effective January 1, 2027 as necessary to purge "woke" elements and restore a "warrior ethos". The announcement raised concerns over political interference in the Pentagon and sparked criticism of sidelining experience, discouraging dissent, and appointing political loyalists. Hegseth stated the military would remove "ideological clowns" and that "patriotic cowboys are in with testosterone testing on top". In September 2026, Hegseth stated in a speech at Quantico that the military wasn't open to "trannies" or "beardos".

In October 2026, Hegseth stated that the execution by firing squad of former US army major Nidal Hasan would be livestreamed. The White House, however, overruled the livestreaming of the event, following bipartisan pushback.

On October 29, 2026, The Atlantic reported that Democrats were considering whether to launch investigations and, if they won control of the House of Representatives in the November midterm elections (which they did), pursue impeachment proceedings against Hegseth. Their concerns included his handling of the 2026 Iran war, U.S. attacks on suspected drug-smuggling vessels, the removal of senior military officials, and allegations of obstruction of congressional oversight. House Minority Leader Hakeem Jeffries had called for Hegseth's removal from office but had not explicitly stated that impeachment was the party's intended course of action. Democrats were also considering alternatives to impeachment, including hearings, investigations, subpoenas, and measures related to defense spending. Also on October 29, Trump criticized the possibility of Democrats impeaching Hegseth if they gained control of the House, describing the defense secretary as "a great warrior."

On Veterans' Day, November 11, 2026, Hegseth and a group accompanying him posed for photographs in front of the Tomb of the Unknown Soldier, audibly chatting and laughing. A U.S. Army sentinel guarding the tomb shouted at the group that "all visitors will maintain an atmosphere of silence and respect at all times". Hegseth awarded the sentinel with a medal following the incident.

=== Impeachment ===
On November 9, 2026, Rep. Thomas Massie (R-KY) filed articles of impeachment against Hegseth. (He had previously introduced these on September 15, 2026, but the Republican leadership quashed them by starting the election-season recess of the House early.) Three of the articles concern the Iran war; they accuse Hegseth of waging the war without congressional authorization (Note: Article I of the articles of impeachment contain the first charge, waging a war in Iran without congressional authorization, which is considered to be a violation of the War Powers Resolution of 1973 (50 U.S.C. 1541-48).) and continuing it after Congress voted to direct the President to terminate the conflict or seek authorization to continue it. "The remaining charges accuse Mr. Hegseth of carrying out unlawful military strikes against suspected drug traffickers; unlawfully capturing Venezuela’s president, Nicolás Maduro; conducting unauthorized military operations in Yemen; disregarding laws intended to minimize civilian casualties; and abusing his power by retaliating against Senator Mark Kelly for protected speech," The New York Times reported. However, the following day, November 10, 2026, Congress voted 211 to 204 to refer the articles of impeachment filed to committee. Eleven Democrats were no-shows for the vote. According to a National Public Radio (NPR) article:

If those 11 had been there and if no more Republicans showed up, the attempt would have gone forward.

== Political positions ==
=== Domestic issues ===
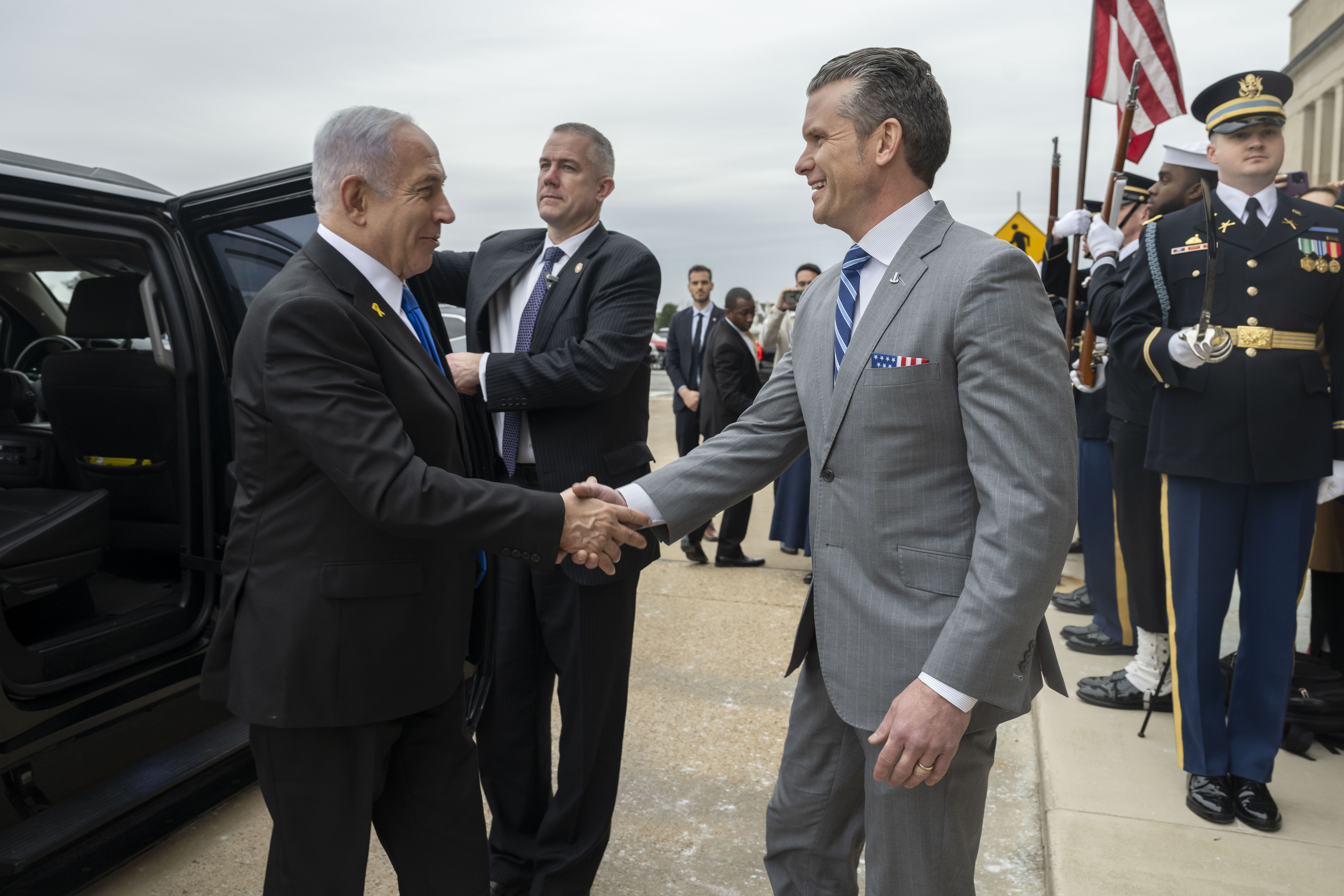
Hegseth meeting with Israeli prime minister Benjamin Netanyahu in February 2025

Hegseth holds strongly conservative views and has been regarded as a Christian nationalist by critics. (Note: Attributed to multiple references:) In his book American Crusade (2020), Hegseth characterized "Americanism" as being opposition to movements such as feminism, globalism, Marxism, and progressivism, equated democracy to a leftist demand, and expressed support for gerrymandering to "screw Democrats". He described progressives and Democrats as enemies of freedom, the United States, and the Constitution. Hegseth has said that victory for America includes the end of, communism, socialism, Islamism, globalism, secularism, "genderism", and environmentalism. He has repeated false claims of electoral fraud in the 2020 presidential election and spread conspiracy theories about Antifa involvement in the January 6 attack. As defense secretary, Hegseth promoted culture war issues, derided "secular humanism", and promoted conservative evangelicalism.

Hegseth initially supported Florida senator Marco Rubio in the 2016 Republican Party presidential primaries, later favored Texas senator Ted Cruz, and ultimately endorsed Donald Trump. He defended Trump's policies in his first term, including his interactions with North Korean supreme leader Kim Jong Un, the 2020–2021 US troop withdrawal from Afghanistan, and the assassination of Qasem Soleimani. In 2016 on Fox News, Hegseth criticized Hillary Clinton for her email controversy, stating that her "recklessness in handling information" would usually lead to job firings and potential criminal charges, while also risking foreign access to sensitive information and harming relationships with allies. (Note: Attributed to multiple references:)

In a March 2012 interview with National Review, Hegseth advocated for premium support in Medicare, opposed contraception mandates, and described the Keystone Pipeline as a choice between jobs and environmental impact, asserting he would "always side with jobs." On Fox & Friends in 2019, Hegseth described climate change as an attempt at government control. In March 2025, he canceled climate change studies and decried the phenomenon as "crap" on social media. That month, he sought to eliminate climate planning from the Department of Defense but included an exception for extreme weather preparation.

=== Foreign policy ===
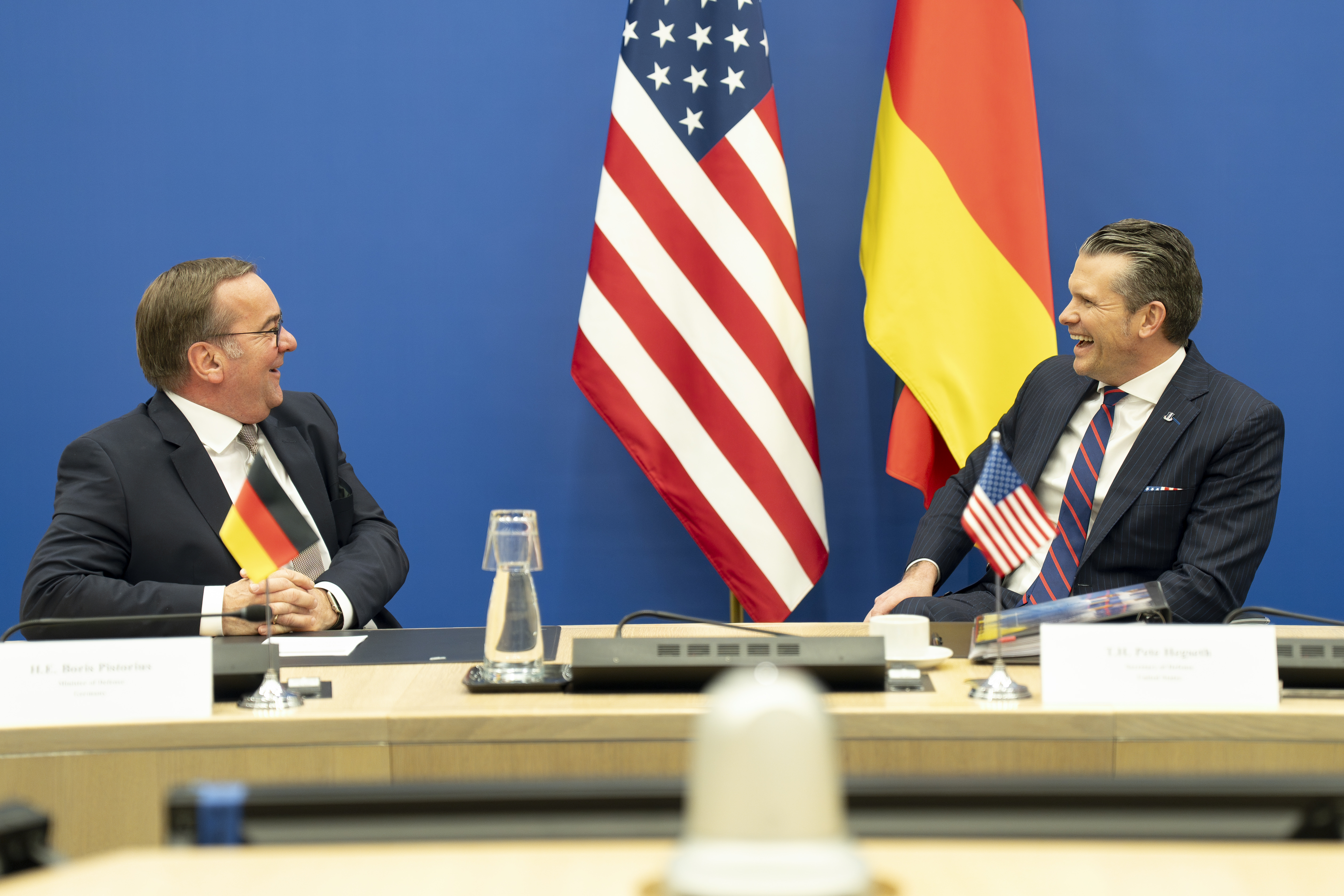
Hegseth and German defence minister Boris Pistorius at NATO Headquarters on February 12, 2025

In November 2009, Hegseth supported sending additional forces into Afghanistan during the War in Afghanistan. He advocated for withdrawing from Afghanistan in his interview with the National Review, but argued that special operators should remain in the country and that the Afghan Army should be supported to avert a conflict.

Hegseth has criticized NATO and the United Nations. After the Russian invasion of Ukraine, he called Putin a war criminal, but he later told Fox News host Harris Faulkner that the invasion was less significant than "wokeness" and crime. He has criticized United States military aid to Ukraine. In January 2020, he supported Donald Trump's threat of the destruction of Iranian cultural sites.

Hegseth has supported the premiership of Benjamin Netanyahu. After Netanyahu was expected to be criminally charged in March 2019 for alleged bribery and fraud, he posted a video of Hegseth describing him as a "great friend to the United States". He has argued that the Chinese government is "building a military to defeat the United States" and repeated claims by Trump that "tens of thousands of Chinese nationals" have been sent to the Mexico–United States border. In May 2020, Hegseth said the "communist Chinese" want to "end our civilization".

=== Military affairs ===
In a Yale Political Union speech in October 2008, Hegseth disagreed with "Don't ask, don't tell", the United States's position on homosexuality in the military at the time, but noted that "Radical Islam is a far greater threat." In a podcast interview with Shawn Ryan in November 2024, Hegseth stated that women should not serve in combat roles.

As defense secretary, Hegseth promoted basing Pentagon policy on culture war issues. During his 2025 speech in front of over 800 generals and admirals, Hegseth blamed them of having restrictive rules of engagement, allowing liberal ideas and "toxic ideological garbage", and accused them without evidence of lowering standards to let women in the military. During his September 30, 2026 "State of the Force" address, Hegseth stated the military would have "No fatties, no trannies, no beardos, no weirdos, no wimps, no radicals", and that there would be no more "silly PowerPoint trainings or drag queen shows", "gender pronouns", or "identity months".

Hegseth opposed Operation Iron Triangle, a raid in August 2006 that resulted in the death of three Iraqi men, which he described as "atrocities" to an audience at the University of Virginia. He has criticized the US military for accusing soldiers of committing war crimes. In an op-ed in The Guardian from March 2026, political philosopher Jan-Werner Müller wrote that "Pete Hegseth [was] promoting a nihilist cult of death".

== Personal life ==
=== Marriages and relationships ===
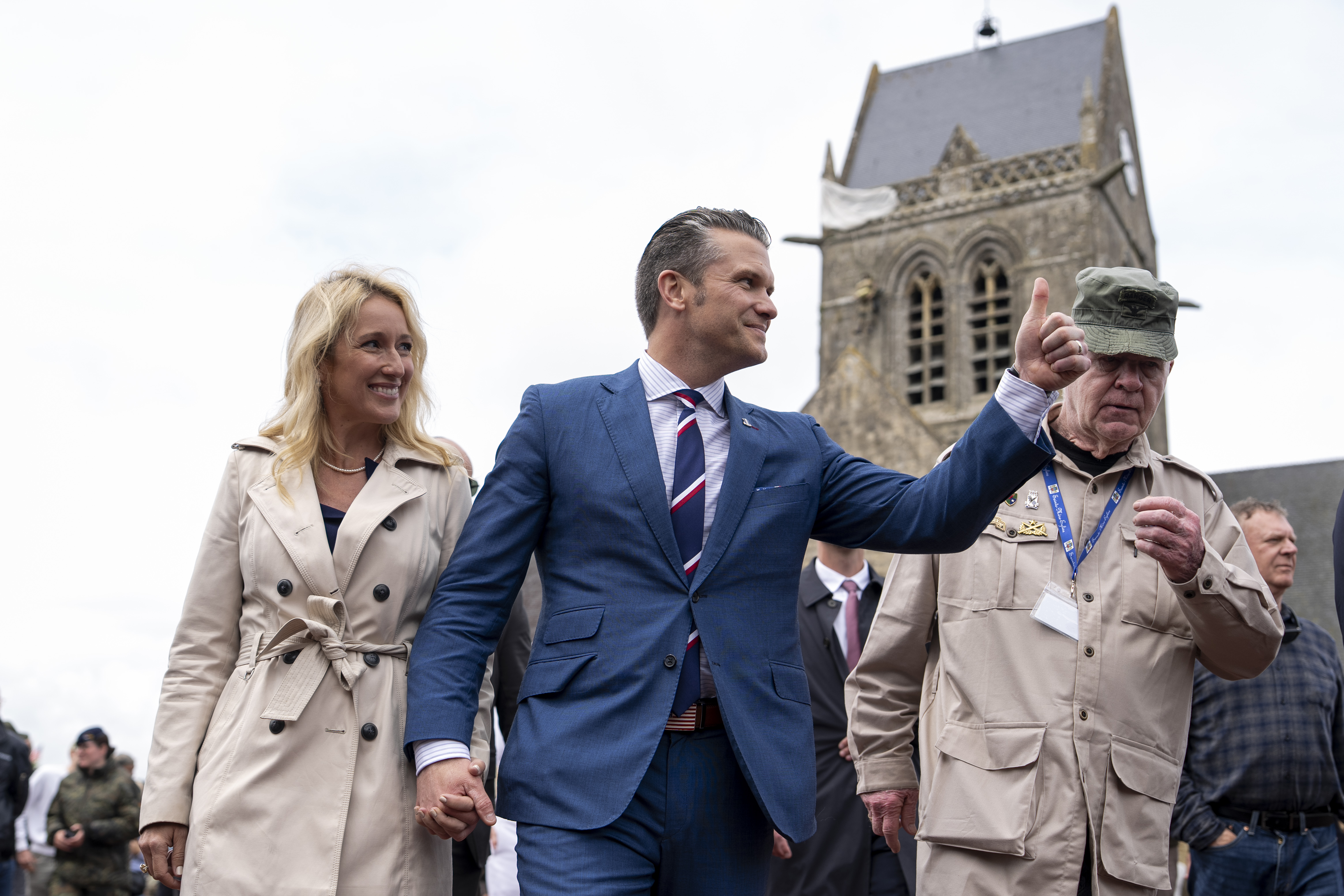
Hegseth and his third wife Jennifer Hegseth in June 2025

While attending Forest Lake Area High School, Hegseth began dating classmate Meredith Schwarz. They were voted "most likely to marry" by their graduating class. After they both graduated in 1999, they got married in 2004 at the Cathedral of Saint Paul in Minnesota. Schwarz filed for divorce in December 2008 after Hegseth admitted to five affairs.

In 2008, Hegseth began dating Samantha Deering, whom he had met at Vets For Freedom. Hegseth married Deering in 2010 and the couple had three children. Deering filed for divorce in 2017 after it came out that Hegseth fathered a child to a producer on Fox & Friends, Jennifer Rauchet.

In 2019, Hegseth married Rauchet at Trump National Golf Club Colts Neck in New Jersey, an event attended by the Trump family. Rauchet has three children from a previous marriage.

=== Abuse and sexual assault allegations ===
You are an abuser of women — that is the ugly truth and I have no respect for any man that belittles, lies, cheats, sleeps around, and uses women for his own power and ego. You are that man (and have been for years)

— Hegseth's mother in email to her son in April 2018, later said to have prompted her immediate apology

In November 2024, Vanity Fair reported that Hegseth had allegedly sexually assaulted a woman at the Hyatt Regency Monterey Hotel and Spa on Del Monte Golf Course in Monterey, California, in October 2017, when he was scheduled to speak at the California Federation of Republican Women convention. According to the Monterey Police Department, Hegseth was investigated in connection with two incidents of sexual assault that occurred shortly before midnight and 7 a.m. the following morning. He was not criminally charged. The Washington Post reported that Hegseth had paid the accuser as part of a non-disclosure agreement after she threatened litigative action in 2020. In addition, the paper obtained a memorandum provided to Donald Trump's presidential transition team by an associate of the accuser, a 30-year-old conservative group staffer, that alleged that Hegseth raped her. Hegseth's lawyer, Timothy Parlatore, later confirmed the reports, but said that the staffer was attempting to extort Hegseth, a purported "victim of blackmail and innocent collateral damage", during the #MeToo movement, risking his career. The Associated Press reported in January 2025 that Hegseth had paid her US$50,000.

Records released by the Monterey Police Department later that month provided additional details on the incident. The accuser told police that she had confronted Hegseth, who informed her that he was a "nice guy", after he had acted "inappropriately" with women at the event. She recalled being in an undisclosed room with Hegseth, who allegedly took her phone and blocked the door, where he then allegedly raped her. The accuser said that "things got fuzzy" and told a nurse days later that she had believed she had been drugged. Hegseth told police that he had sought to ensure she was comfortable. Video surveillance footage showed Hegseth and the accuser walking, with her smiling. Two women who were interviewed by police stated that Hegseth had put his hand on their thighs and asked them to go to his hotel room, with one woman saying that she had asked the accuser to get him off her. According to CNN, the accuser went to a hospital to report a sexual assault and obtained a rape kit test in the emergency room. The rape kit exam served as the impetus for the Monterey Police Department's investigation. Hegseth told police that he did have sex with the woman but that it was consensual. Monterey County district attorney Jeannine M. Pacioni declined to file charges in January 2018, saying that proof beyond a reasonable doubt was not established.

In November 2024, The New York Times obtained an email from Hegseth's mother, Penny, from April 2018, accusing her son of having mistreated women for years. After the Times's reporting, Penny told the paper that she had "immediately apologized in a separate email" and that her words were written "in anger, with emotion". She defended her son on Fox News, saying he was "redeemed, forgiven, changed". In January 2025, NBC News reported that Samantha's sister Danielle had sent an affidavit to senators alleging that he had made his wife concerned for her safety, with Samantha said to have once hid in a closet and to have formed an escape plan that was once used. Hegseth's lawyer Parlatore dismissed the allegations.

=== Religion ===
In In the Arena (2016), Hegseth described his Christian faith as initially "more out of diligent habit than deep conviction". Following the September 11 attacks, he developed a hatred for Islamic terrorism, and "he found himself repelled by the [Princeton University] campus chapel's 'gospel of moral relativism,' and disparaged his fellow students for focusing on peace and 'mutual understanding' rather than 'condemnations of Islamic terrorism'". He told Nashville Christian Family that he experienced a religious transformation in 2018 after he and his wife, Jennifer, began attending the Colts Neck Community Church in New Jersey. Seeking to send their children to Jonathan Edwards Classical Academy, a Christian school, the Hegseths moved to Nashville, Tennessee, three years later. There, they joined the Pilgrim Hill Reformed Fellowship, a church in the Communion of Reformed Evangelical Churches (CREC). Hegseth is a supporter of CREC co-founder Douglas Wilson. In August 2025, he favorably shared a video from CNN featuring Wilson, with Hegseth commenting on a video that included a pastor from Wilson's church calling for the repeal of women's right to vote, another pastor stating that husbands should cast votes for their entire household, and Wilson stating that women should not hold leadership positions in the military.

Hegseth supports the idea of holy war and has repeatedly praised the Crusades, claiming that people who enjoy the "benefits" of western culture should "thank a crusader". Two of Hegseth's tattoos allude to the Crusades.

=== Tattoos ===
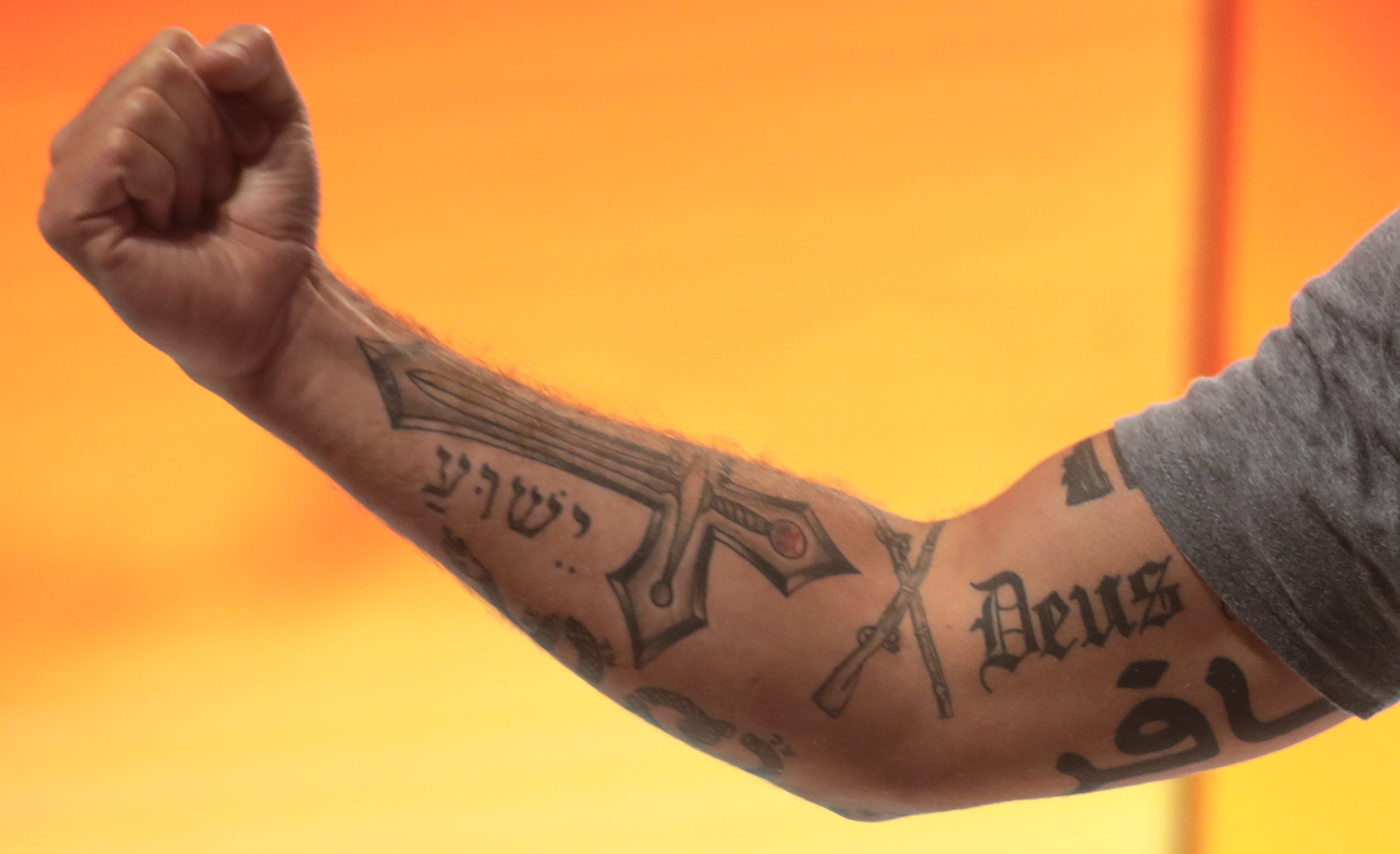
Some of Hegseth's tattoos in 2021

Hegseth has tattoos that depict various things, including the words Deus vult ("God wills" in Latin); a Jerusalem cross; the Arabic word kafir (transl. unbeliever); the 1754 political cartoon Join, or Die; the words "We the People"; a cross and sword with Hebrew lettering reading Yeshua (ישוע); the coat of arms of the 187th Infantry Regiment, including its motto Ne Desit Virtus or "Let Valor Not Fail"; the Chi Rho Christogram, which was the standard of the Christian Roman Empire and has been interpreted as an anti-pagan symbol.

Several of these have drawn criticism. Some Muslims have said that his "kafir" tattoo signals Islamophobia. In 2021, D.C. National Guard leaders' concerns over his Deus vult tattoo led them to remove Hegseth from a Guard mission to protect the inauguration of President Joe Biden. The phrase has been adopted as a slogan by a variety of Christian right and Christian nationalist groups, as well as alt-right and white supremacist groups, and the combination of Deus Vult and the Jerusalem cross has been associated with right-wing extremist groups. (Note: Attributed to multiple references:) The D.C. National Guard believed the Deus Vult tattoo, because of its association with white supremacists, suggested he might be an insider threat. In later retellings, Hegseth asserted that the incident prompted his resignation from the Guard; he also asserted that the concerns were actually about his Jerusalem cross .

== Awards and decorations ==
Hegseth's awards and decorations include:

Combat Infantryman Badge
Bronze Star Medal with bronze oak leaf cluster	Joint Service Commendation Medal	Army Commendation Medal with bronze oak leaf cluster
National Defense Service Medal	Afghanistan Campaign Medal with two bronze service stars	Iraq Campaign Medal with two bronze service stars
Global War on Terrorism Expeditionary Medal	Global War on Terrorism Service Medal	Armed Forces Reserve Medal
Army Service Ribbon	Overseas Service Ribbon	NATO Medal

In addition, Hegseth was awarded the Expert Infantryman Badge, making him a de facto recipient of the Master Combat Infantryman Badge.

== Written works ==
Hegseth published his memoir, In the Arena: Good Citizens, a Great Republic, and How One Speech Can Reinvigorate America, in 2016. In May 2020, he released American Crusade: Our Fight to Stay Free. In October, Fox News Media reached a three-book agreement with HarperCollins to publish books by Fox News hosts, beginning with Hegseth's Modern Warriors: Real Stories from Real Heroes in November. He co-authored Battle for the American Mind: Uprooting a Century of Miseducation with David Goodwin, the president of the Association of Classical Christian Schools, in 2022. In June 2024, Hegseth published The War on Warriors: Behind the Betrayal of the Men Who Keep Us Free. American Crusade, Modern Warriors, Battle for the American Mind, and The War on Warriors have reached The New York Times Best Seller list. He wrote the foreword to The Case Against the Establishment (2017), a book written by Nick Adams and Dave Erickson.

== Works cited ==
=== General books ===
- Adams, Nick; Erickson, Dave (2017). The Case Against the Establishment. New York: Post Hill Press. ISBN 9781682614747.
- Baker, Peter; Glasser, Susan (2022). The Divider: Trump in the White House, 2017-2021. New York: Penguin Random House. ISBN 9780385546539.
- Stelter, Brian (2022). Hoax: Donald Trump, Fox News and the Dangerous Distortion of Truth. New York: Atria Publishing Group. ISBN 9781982142445.

=== Self-authored books ===
- Hegseth, Pete (2024). The War on Warriors: Behind the Betrayal of the Men Who Keep Us Free. New York: Broadside Books. ISBN 9780063389427.

Political offices
Preceded by Lloyd Austin	United States Secretary of Defense; 2025–present	Incumbent
Order of precedence
Preceded by Scott Bessent as Secretary of the Treasury	Order of precedence of the United States as Secretary of Defense	Succeeded by Todd Blanche as Attorney General
U.S. presidential line of succession
Preceded by Scott Bessent as Secretary of the Treasury	Sixth in line as Secretary of Defense	Succeeded by Todd Blanche as Attorney General
