= James Lileks =

American journalist

- Education: University of Minnesota
- Occupations: Journalist, writer
- Website: lileks.com

James Lileks is an American journalist, columnist, author, and blogger living in Minneapolis, Minnesota. He is the creator of The Gallery of Regrettable Foods website.

== Career ==
=== Columnist ===
Lileks began his writing career as a columnist for the Minnesota Daily while he was a student at the University of Minnesota. After college, he wrote for City Pages, a Twin Cities alternative tabloid. He served as a general columnist for City Pages until 1988, when he was hired as a columnist for the St. Paul Pioneer Press. This led to a columnist job with Newhouse News Service and thence The Washington Post for a period in the early 1990s. In the mid-1990s, Lileks returned to the Twin Cities for a job with the Star Tribune, retaining his Newhouse column until late 2006. The Star Tribune discontinued Lileks's column in 2007, eventually naming him editor of the now defunct community website buzz.mn. Lileks' final column for the Star Tribune was on August 12, 2024. He retired from the newspaper in 2025.

Lileks also writes a regular column (Athwart) for National Review.

=== Radio personality ===
Lileks's first foray into radio came in 1987, while he was a writer with City Pages. He became a regular guest on the Geoff Charles show, an afternoon talk show on KSTP. When Charles left the Twin Cities, Lileks filled the slot and served as an afternoon-drive host on KSTP for a time in the late 1980s. In the mid-1990s, after returning from Washington DC, Lileks reappeared on KSTP with a new program, The Diner – a show set in a fictional 1950s-era diner. The show lasted several years on weekday evenings and then a few more as a weekend-evening program before leaving the air in the late 1990s. As of October 23, 2013, The Diner was revived on Ricochet.com.

In late 2006, The Diner was revived in podcast form. Selected original Diner programs and new original Diners are available on Lileks's website. Lileks is also a weekly guest on the Hugh Hewitt show, Pajamas Media's weekly PJM Political show on Sirius-XM Satellite Radio's POTUS channel, and a frequent guest and guest host on the Northern Alliance Radio Network program.

Lileks has also been a monologist for the public affairs program Almanac, carried on Minnesota PBS television stations.

=== Website ===
Lileks's blog, the Daily Bleat, began in 1997. The Bleat covers many topics in his personal life, including his daughter Natalie (referred to as "Gnat" until she became old enough to object) and the family's dogs, politics from a conservative viewpoint, and cultural points of interest ranging from art and architecture to movies and music. One perennial topic is the Minnesota State Fair. Lileks's website also hosts a vast repository of vintage advertisements and other ephemera from the 1920s to the 1970s.

=== Other work ===
Lileks is a regular contributor to the social networking and blogging network Ricochet.com, and co-hosts the site's flagship podcast with Rob Long and Peter Robinson.

== Star Tribune controversy and resolution ==
On May 7, 2007, Lileks announced that his home paper, the Minneapolis Star Tribune, was ending his column in the interest of budget cuts and putting him on a straight local-news beat.

The move, which was forced by cuts in other parts of the Star Tribune's newsroom, drew criticism from many, Mike Argento, president of the National Society of Newspaper Columnists, said in reaction to the news:

It's just a reflection of the sad state of the newspaper industry. Many of the people running newspapers don't have a vision. They're concerned with dollars and cents, and the bottom line. They should look at the future, not just slash and burn.

On June 5, 2007, the Star Tribune changed course and announced Lileks would serve as editor of buzz.mn, a community website. Buzz.mn ceased publication of new content in July 2009.

== Bibliography ==
=== Fiction ===
- Falling Up the Stairs (1988, ISBN 0-525-24655-X)
- Mr. Obvious (1995, ISBN 0-671-73705-8)
- Graveyard Special (2012, ASIN B00962GFES)
- The Casablanca Tango (2014, ASIN B00NDLYM70)

=== Columns ===
- Notes of a Nervous Man (1991, ISBN 0-671-73701-5)
- Fresh Lies (1995, ISBN 0-671-73703-1)

=== Humor ===
- The Gallery of Regrettable Food (2001, ISBN 0-609-60782-0)
- Interior Desecrations: Hideous Homes from the Horrible '70s (2004, ISBN 1-4000-4640-8)
- Mommy Knows Worst: Highlights from the Golden Age of Bad Parenting Advice (2005, ISBN 1-4000-8228-5)
- Gastroanomalies: Questionable Culinary Creations from the Golden Age of American Cookery (2007, ISBN 0-307-38307-5)
- RiffTrax - special guest riffer for Spider-Man 3
