= Culture11 =

American right-leaning online magazine

- Available in: English
- Dissolved: January 27, 2009
- Creator: William Bennett
- Website: culture11.com
- Launched: August 27, 2008
- Current status: defunct

Culture11, also stylized Culture 11, was a short-lived right-leaning American online magazine active from August 27, 2008, until January 27, 2009. It portrayed itself as a "center-right Slate", with a focus on cultural and media criticism. It was founded by William Bennett and run by David Kuo. Despite rumors that the site had enough funding to last through 2010, it shut down on January 27, 2009, after running out of the money it had raised, and after its investors also lost considerable assets due to the 2008 financial crisis. Among the alumni of Culture11 are Conor Friedersdorf, who served as its features editor, Peter Suderman, who was its arts editor, and James Poulos, who served as its political editor and went on to become the managing editor of Ricochet.
