= Uncommon Knowledge =

- Genre: Talk
- Format: Video
- Language: English

Cast and voices
- Hosted by: Peter Robinson

Production
- Production: Hoover Institution

Technical specifications
- Video format: YouTube

Publication
- Original release: May 18, 1996

Related
- Website: www.youtube.com/user/HooverInstitution

Uncommon Knowledge is a current affairs show hosted by Peter Robinson and produced by the Hoover Institution, where Peter Robinson is a fellow. It currently is funded by several foundations and organizations. Uploads of the program regularly appear online on websites such as National Review Online and YouTube.

Uncommon Knowledge was originally a weekly 30-minute TV show co-produced and presented by San Jose, California, PBS member station KTEH from 1996 to 2005. It was distributed first by American Public Television and later by PBS to public television stations throughout the United States and internationally by NPR Worldwide.

== Revival ==
In 2006 and 2007, the Hoover Institution produced a sporadic series of for-web interviews involving Peter Robinson called Directors' Forum Video. In July 2007, these Directors' Forum Video webcasts were rebranded under the old Uncommon Knowledge moniker, starting with the newly produced episode "Land of Lincoln".

Starting in 2008, each of these new webcasts premieres on National Review Online in five parts throughout the week before being published on the Hoover Institution website, Facebook, YouTube, and other social media outlets. In addition, the Hoover Institution posts upcoming episodes as a podcast titled Uncommon Knowledge, which can be downloaded from iTunes or as part of the Hoover Institution iTunes U download page. New episodes are published every other week. Viewers are permitted to suggest guests and ask questions of upcoming guests to be selected by the Uncommon Knowledge team, and/or Robinson, the interviewer-host. The viewers whose questions are selected often win the books or publications of the guests being interviewed.

The show interacts with viewers on social media such as Facebook, Twitter, and Ricochet.

== Format ==
=== Style ===
Before its transition into a contiguous program in 2008, the show would typically invite up to three guests with opposing points of view on controversial issues and/or matters of international/public policy to debate each other on the air. Robinson moderated and posited devil's advocate–type arguments, recited quotations to elicit the perspectives of his guests, and questioned the guests. After several segments the show concluded with Robinson asking the guests to predict what the future holds for the issue in question. He would also invite individual guests for one-on-one interviews, using much of the same interview style.

In its rebirth transition from 2007-2008, and then in its reinstatement in 2008, it adopted the style of a more classic interview program, with up to three guests, but not ones designed to disagree or debate. Rather, Robinson finds like-minded or intellectually connected guests to create a more basic interview style, employing the same tactics as before to elicit the whole of a singular perspective, with guests who disagree, but not in the radically opposing sides format the program had previously favored. Primarily, however, departing from the pre-2008 style, Robinson mostly invites single guests to do one-on-one interviews and discuss the opinions and ideas of the individual guest.

=== Setting ===
Before the 2007–2008 transition, and the 2008 rebirth, the background for the program was that of a definitive setting, a room filled with historical and unusual objects, faded artifacts and items, antique furniture, etc., surrounding the wooden interview table. During the '07-'08 revival period, as well as the permanent revival in 2008, the background moved to the classic style interview program background with a plain black background, wooden table, chairs, and carpet, with some brief experimentation around that setup.

Archives of streaming video, transcripts, and MP3 audio are available from the website for most episodes after 2000. For previous years, transcripts are available. Some videotapes of these episodes have been recovered and are being posted on YouTube under the account names "UKHoover" and "HooverInstitution."
