= List of Sullivan & Son episodes =

Sullivan & Son was a TBS sitcom created by Steve Byrne and Rob Long. The series premiered on July 19, 2012, and follows Steve Sullivan, who surprises his parents when he leaves his job behind as a corporate lawyer to take over a bar owned by his father.

On November 20, 2014, the show was cancelled after 33 episodes and its third season.

== Series overview ==
Season	Episodes	Originally released	
Season	Episodes	First released	Last released
1	10	July 19, 2012	September 13, 2012
2	10	June 13, 2013	August 22, 2013
3	13	June 24, 2014	September 9, 2014

== Episodes ==
=== Season 1 (2012) ===
No. overall	No. in season	Title	Directed by	Written by	Original release date	Prod. code	U.S. viewers (millions)
1	1	"Pilot: Last, Best, and Final"	Ted Wass	Steve Byrne & Rob Long	July 19, 2012	296026	2.50
2	2	"The Bribe"	Ted Wass	Brenda Hsueh	July 19, 2012	2M6052	2.03
3	3	"The Bar Birthday"	James Widdoes	Mike Teverbaugh	July 26, 2012	2M6054	2.48
4	4	"Who's Your Daddy"	John Whitesell	Howard J. Morris	August 2, 2012	2M6053	1.77
5	5	"The Punch"	James Widdoes	Shelly Gossman	August 9, 2012	2M6055	1.95
6	6	"Creepy Love Songs"	John Whitesell	Tim Fall	August 16, 2012	2M6056	2.43
7	7	"The Fifth Musketeer"	Mark Cendrowski	Howard J. Morris	August 23, 2012	2M6059	2.33
8	8	"How Carol Got Her Groove Back"	Ted Wass	Valeri Vaughn	August 30, 2012	2M6058	2.09
9	9	"The Prodigal Sister"	Gil Junger	F. J. Pratt & Dan Cohen	September 6, 2012	2M6060	2.32
10	10	"Hank's Speech"	Peter Billingsley	F. J. Pratt & Dan Cohen	September 13, 2012	2M6057	2.12

=== Season 2 (2013) ===
No. overall	No. in season	Title	Directed by	Written by	Original release date	Prod. code	U.S. viewers (millions)
11	1	"The Pilot, One More Time"	Peter Billingsley	Barry Safchik & Michael Platt	June 13, 2013	2M6351	2.10
12	2	"Acceptance"	Peter Billingsley	Howard J. Morris	June 20, 2013	2M6352	1.82
13	3	"Ladies Night"	Walt Becker	Zak Shaikh	June 27, 2013	2M6356	2.15
14	4	"Winning is Everything"	Mark Cendrowski	F. J. Pratt & Dan Cohen	July 11, 2013	2M6355	1.74
15	5	"Rumspringa"	Rob Schiller	Valeri Vaughn	July 18, 2013	2M6358	2.05
16	6	"Hank Hallucinates"	Rob Schiller	F. J. Pratt & Dan Cohen	July 25, 2013	2M6357	1.84
17	7	"Running Mates"	Peter Billingsley	Brenda Hsueh	August 1, 2013	2M6353	2.24
18	8	"Personal Injury"	Peter Billingsley	Shelly Gossman	August 8, 2013	2M6359	2.14
19	9	"Over the Edge"	Rob Schiller	Caleb Bacon	August 15, 2013	2M6354	1.95
20	10	"Reunited"	Phill Lewis	Tim Fall	August 22, 2013	2M6360	1.90

=== Season 3 (2014) ===
No. overall	No. in season	Title	Directed by	Written by	Original release date	Prod. code	U.S. viewers (millions)
21	1	"The Big O"	Phill Lewis	Barry Safchik & Michael Platt	June 24, 2014	2M6655	1.61
22	2	"Everybody Loved Frank"	Rob Schiller	Tom Anderson	June 24, 2014	2M6653	1.27
23	3	"About a Boy, His Mother, and the Man They're Dating"	Phill Lewis	Tim Fall	July 1, 2014	2M6656	1.69
24	4	"Sexual Healing"	Rob Schiller	F. J. Pratt & Dan Cohen	July 8, 2014	2M6652	1.96
25	5	"Luck of the Half-Irish"	James Widdoes	Caleb Bacon	July 15, 2014	2M6654	1.63
26	6	"Lyle & Son"	Stephen Prime	Nick Fascitelli & Alex Kavallierou	July 22, 2014	2M6661	1.38
27	7	"Open Mic Night"	Rob Schiller	Valeri Vaughn	July 29, 2014	2M6657	1.60
28	8	"Hank Goes Black"	Paul Boese	Barry Safchik & Michael Platt	August 5, 2014	2M6659	1.61
29	9	"OwenBrau"	Phill Lewis	F. J. Pratt & Dan Cohen	August 12, 2014	2M6663	1.40
30	10	"Monkey Plate"	Peter Billingsley	Joe Heslinga	August 19, 2014	2M6662	1.60
31	11	"Sullivan's Travels"	Rob Long	Howard J. Morris	August 26, 2014	2M6651	1.45
32	12	"A Kiss Is Never Just a Kiss"	James Widdoes	Daphne Pollon	September 2, 2014	2M6658	1.55
33	13	"You, Me, and Gary"	Katy Garretson	Kristine Songco & Joanna Lewis	September 9, 2014	2M6660	1.78
