= Bamboo curtain =

Political demarcation

East Asian Cold War alliances in 1959. Note that at the time, the Kingdom of Laos was allied with the US, and the communist Pathet Lao did not take over the country until 1975. Also, North and South Vietnams had not yet been united. The boundaries of the now-independent former Soviet republics are anachronistically shown for context.

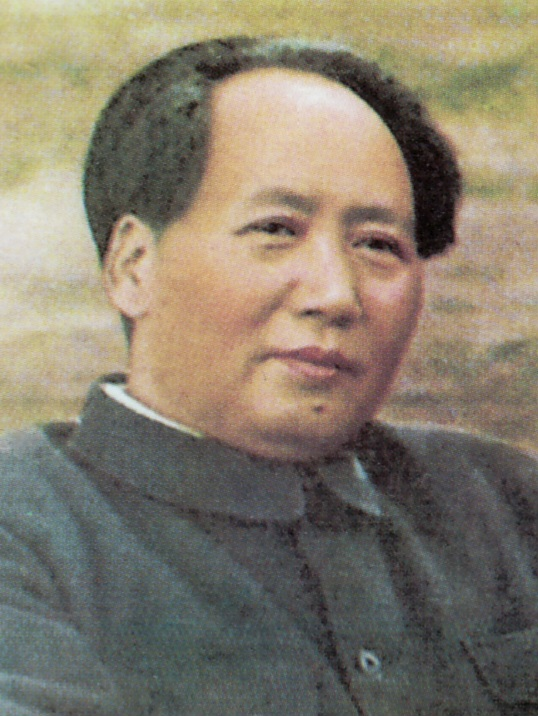
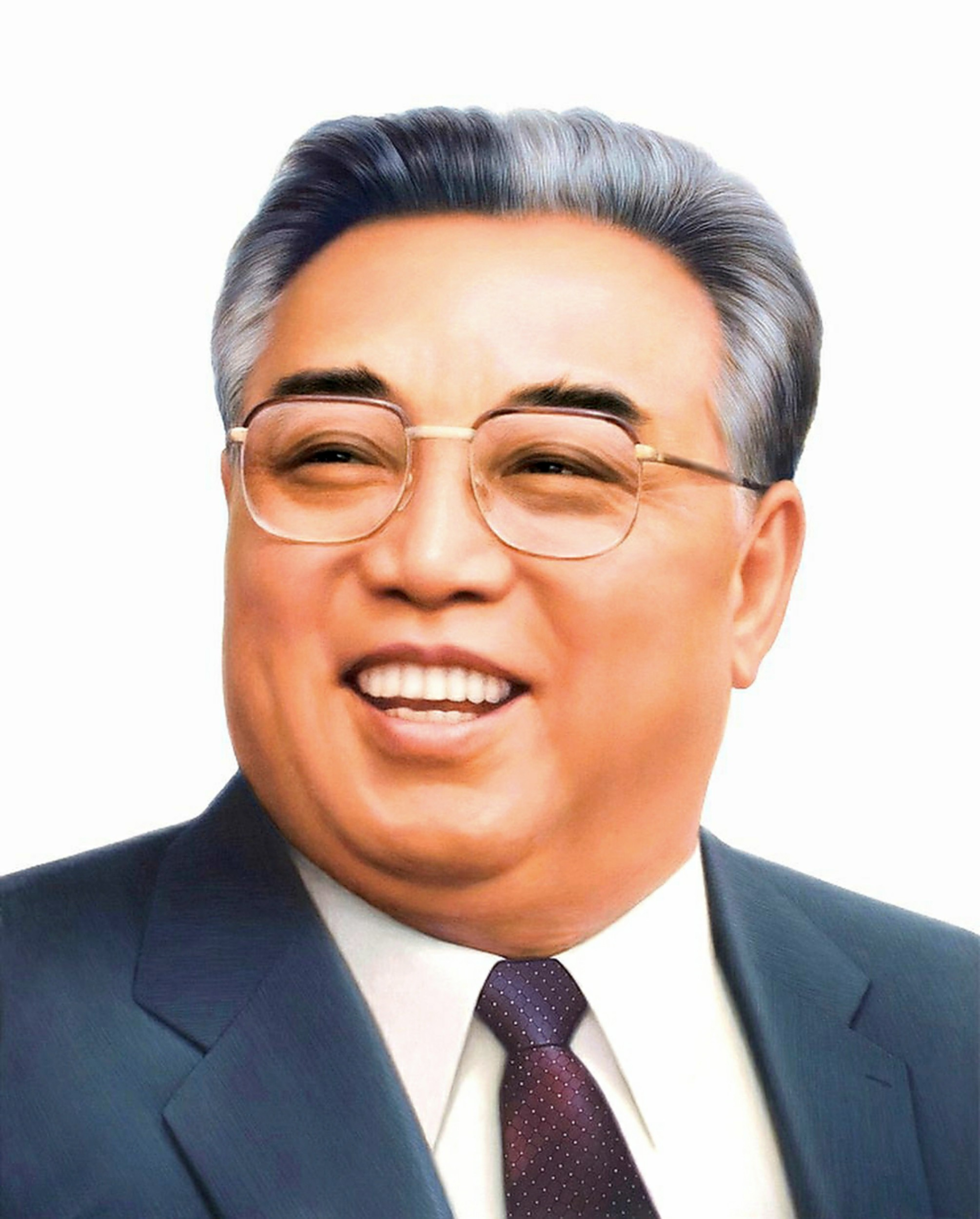
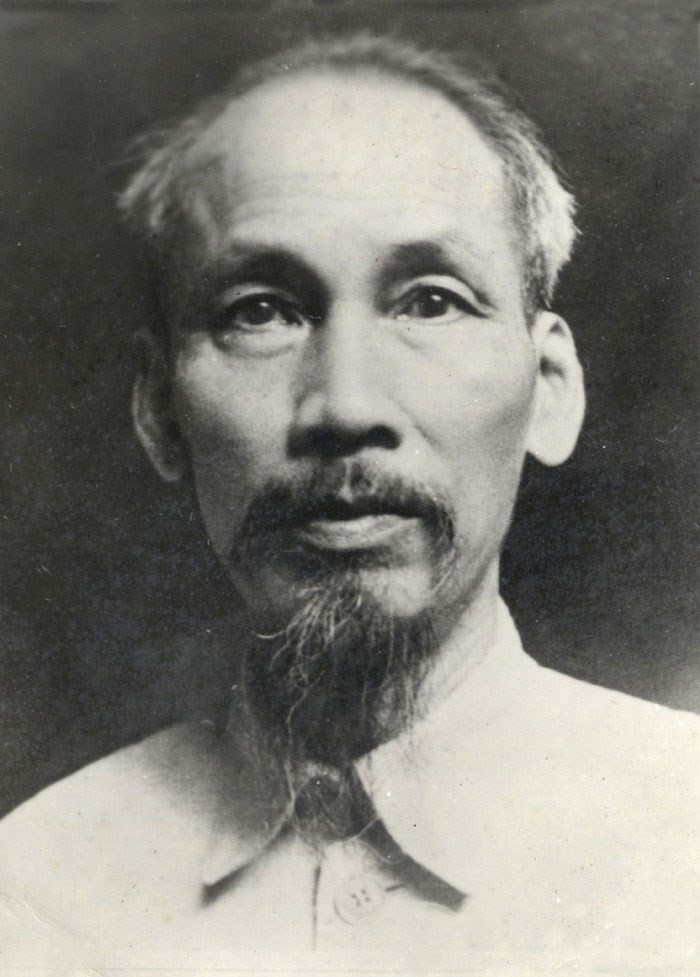
Mao Zedong (Chairman of the Chinese Communist Party), Kim Il Sung (Chairman of the Workers' Party of Korea) and Ho Chi Minh (Chairman of the Communist Party of Vietnam) were the three emerging communist leaders in Asia at the beginning of the Cold War.

The bamboo curtain was a political demarcation between the communist states of East Asia, particularly the People's Republic of China and the non-communist states of East, South and Southeast Asia. To the north and northwest lay the communist states of China, the Soviet Union (until 1991), North Vietnam (until 1975), North Korea, the Democratic Republic of Afghanistan (until 1992), and the Mongolian People's Republic (until 1990). To the south and east lay the non-communist countries of Pakistan, Japan, Indonesia, Malaysia, Singapore, Brunei, Bhutan, Sri Lanka, Maldives, Bangladesh, the Philippines, Thailand, Taiwan, South Korea, Hong Kong and Macau.

Following the Korean War, the Korean Demilitarized Zone became an important symbol of this Asian division (though the term bamboo curtain itself is rarely used in that specific context). Before the Vietnam War, the non-communist bloc included South Vietnam, the Kingdom of Laos and the Kingdom of Cambodia. However, after the war, the new governments of Vietnam, Laos, and Democratic Kampuchea became communist states.

== Cold War (1947–1991) ==
The term bamboo curtain was derived from the "Iron Curtain", a term used widely in Europe from the mid-1940s to the late 1980s to refer to that region's communist boundaries. It was used less often than Iron Curtain in part because while the latter remained relatively static for over 40 years, the "bamboo curtain" shifted frequently and was somewhat less precise. The "bamboo curtain" was also located mostly in regions where terrain made the extensive border fortifications that characterized the Iron Curtain impractical. It was also a less accurate description of the political situation in Asia because of the lack of cohesion within the East Asian communist bloc, which resulted in the Sino-Soviet split. During the First Cold War, communist governments in Mongolia, Vietnam, and Laos were allies of the Soviet Union, though they sometimes cooperated with China, while the Khmer Rouge regime was loyal to China. After the Korean War, North Korea avoided taking sides between the Soviets and China. (Since the end of a communist bloc in Asia, North Korea remains on good terms with both Russia and China, although relations between the countries have been strained in modern times.)

During the Cultural Revolution in China, the Chinese authorities put sections of the "curtain" under a lock-down of sorts, forbidding entry into or passage out of the country without permission from the Chinese government. Many would-be refugees attempting to flee to capitalist countries were prevented from escaping. Occasional relaxations led to several waves of refugees into the British crown colony of Hong Kong.

Improved relations between China and the United States during the later years of the Cold War rendered the term more or less obsolete, except when it referred to the Korean Peninsula and the divide between allies of the US and allies of the USSR in Southeast Asia. Even today, the demilitarized zone separating North and South Korea is typically described as the DMZ. Until recently, bamboo curtain was used most often to refer to the enclosed borders and economy of Burma (though this began to open in 2010). The bamboo curtain has since given way to the business model called the bamboo network.

== See also ==
- Containment
- Domino theory
- Vietnamese Demilitarized Zone
