= Sullivan & Son =

American television series

- Genre: Sitcom
- Created by: Steve Byrne; Rob Long
- Starring: Steve Byrne; Christine Ebersole; Brian Doyle-Murray; Jodi Long; Valerie Azlynn; Vivian Bang; Owen Benjamin; Roy Wood, Jr.; Ahmed Ahmed; Dan Lauria
- Composer: Dave Kushner
- Country of origin: United States
- Original language: English
- No. of seasons: 3
- No. of episodes: 33 (list of episodes)

Production
- Executive producers: Steve Byrne; Rob Long; Peter Billingsley; Vince Vaughn
- Camera setup: Multi-camera
- Running time: 22 minutes
- Production companies: Wild West Picture Show Productions; Warner Horizon Television

Original release
- Network: TBS
- Release: July 19, 2012 – September 9, 2014

Sullivan & Son is an American sitcom created by Steve Byrne and Rob Long that was broadcast on TBS. It starred Byrne as Steve Sullivan, who surprises his parents when he leaves his job as a corporate lawyer to take over a bar owned by his father in Pittsburgh. The series was executive-produced by Vince Vaughn, Peter Billingsley, and Long, who also served as showrunner. It premiered on July 19, 2012. On November 20, 2014, TBS cancelled Sullivan & Son after three seasons.

== Overview ==
The series centers on Steve Sullivan (Byrne), a corporate attorney from New York City who visits his Irish American father Jack (Dan Lauria) and Korean mother Ok Cha (Jodi Long) just as they are preparing to sell their bar in a Pittsburgh working-class neighborhood and retire. To their surprise, he decides to stay and run the bar. The bar is a popular venue among the locals, and is the unofficial "town hall" of the neighborhood.

== Cast and characters ==
- Steve Byrne as Steve Sullivan, a half-Irish and half-Korean lawyer who leaves his job to take over his parents' bar in Pittsburgh.
- Dan Lauria as Jack Sullivan, Steve's father.
- Jodi Long as Ok Cha Sullivan, Steve's mother.
- Owen Benjamin as Owen Walsh, a dull-witted and unemployed childhood friend of Steve's with an oedipal complex regarding his mother and a talent for playing the piano.
- Brian Doyle-Murray as Hank Murphy, a bar regular prone to making offensive remarks.
- Christine Ebersole as Carol Walsh, a bar regular and Owen's mother.
- Vivian Bang as Susan Sullivan, Steve's younger sister.
- Valerie Azlynn as Melanie Sutton, an emergency medical technician, bar regular, and love interest of Steve's.
- Roy Wood, Jr. as Roy Williams, Jr., a bar regular and childhood friend of Steve and Owen's.
- Ahmed Ahmed as Ahmed Nassar, a tow truck driver, bar regular, and childhood friend of Steve and Owen's.

=== Recurring ===
- Brian Scolaro as Doug, a bar regular (season one)
- Jesus Trejo as Javier, a bar regular
- Joshua David Gray as Father Perry, a priest and bar regular
- Billy Gardell as Lyle Winkler, Steve's rival.
- John Michael Higgins as Gary Barton
- Ken Jeong as Jason, Susan's overachieving MD husband
- Charles Shaughnessy as Darryl
- Kunal Nayyar as Sanjay/Neal, a man of Indian descent who pretends to be a native of India.
- Brad Keselowski as himself
- Ellen Woglom as Nicolette

=== Special guest stars ===
- Perry Caravello as Gay Pool Hustler #2
- Chris D'Elia as Ryan Capps
- Will Sasso as Robert Sherman
- Kerri Kenney-Silver as Jo Sullivan, Jack's con-artist sister
- Brian George as Amun Nassar, Ahmed's father.
- George Wallace as Leroy Williams, Roy's father
- Ted McGinley as Eugene Casternakie
- Ryan Miller as himself
- Pat Sajak as himself
- Frank Caliendo as Ralph, one of Carol's boyfriends from the local DMV
- Mo Collins as Lilly
- Catherine Reitman as April
- Loretta Devine as Rose, Roy's mother
- Bryan Callen as Paul
- Margaret Cho as Jenny, Ok Cha's niece

== Production ==
Sullivan & Son was ordered to pilot by cable channel TBS on September 30, 2011. It was among three half-hour pilots being considered by the channel, the others being Men at Work and BFF. TBS had been developing comedies that could be paired with reruns of The Big Bang Theory. After greenlighting Men at Work to series in January 2012, TBS was to choose between Sullivan & Son and BFF to fill its new hour-long comedy slot. On February 10, 2012, TBS picked up Sullivan & Son to series with a 10-episode order with a premiere date set for summer 2012.

The pilot was written by Steve Byrne and Rob Long with Byrne in the starring role. Valerie Azlynn, Jodi Long, Vivian Bang, Owen Benjamin, and Dan Lauria were added to the cast in October. The show was filmed in front of a live studio audience. TBS announced that it had renewed Sullivan & Son for a second season of 10 more episodes that premiered on June 13, 2013. On August 20, 2013, TBS announced it had renewed the series for a 13-episode third season that premiered in June 2014.

== Reception ==
=== Critical reception ===
Sullivan & Son has received mixed to negative reviews, garnering a score of 47 out of 100 on Metacritic.

=== Ratings ===
Season	Timeslot (ET/PT)	No. Ep.	Premiered		Ended		TV Season	Viewers (in million)
Season	Timeslot (ET/PT)	No. Ep.	Date	Premiere Viewers (in million)	Date	Finale Viewers (in million)	TV Season	Viewers (in million)
1	Thursdays 10:00 pm	10	July 19, 2012	2.50	September 13, 2012	2.12	2012	2.20
2	Thursdays 10:00 pm	10	June 13, 2013	2.10	August 22, 2013	1.90	2013	1.99
3	Tuesdays 10:00 pm	13	June 24, 2014	1.61	September 9, 2014	1.78	2014	
