= Erlebach =

Former village in Germany

Coordinates: 50°15′10.88″N 10°47′07.51″E

- Village (former)
- Interactive map of Erlebach
- Country: Germany
- State: Thuringia
- District: Hildburghausen
- Founded: 1310

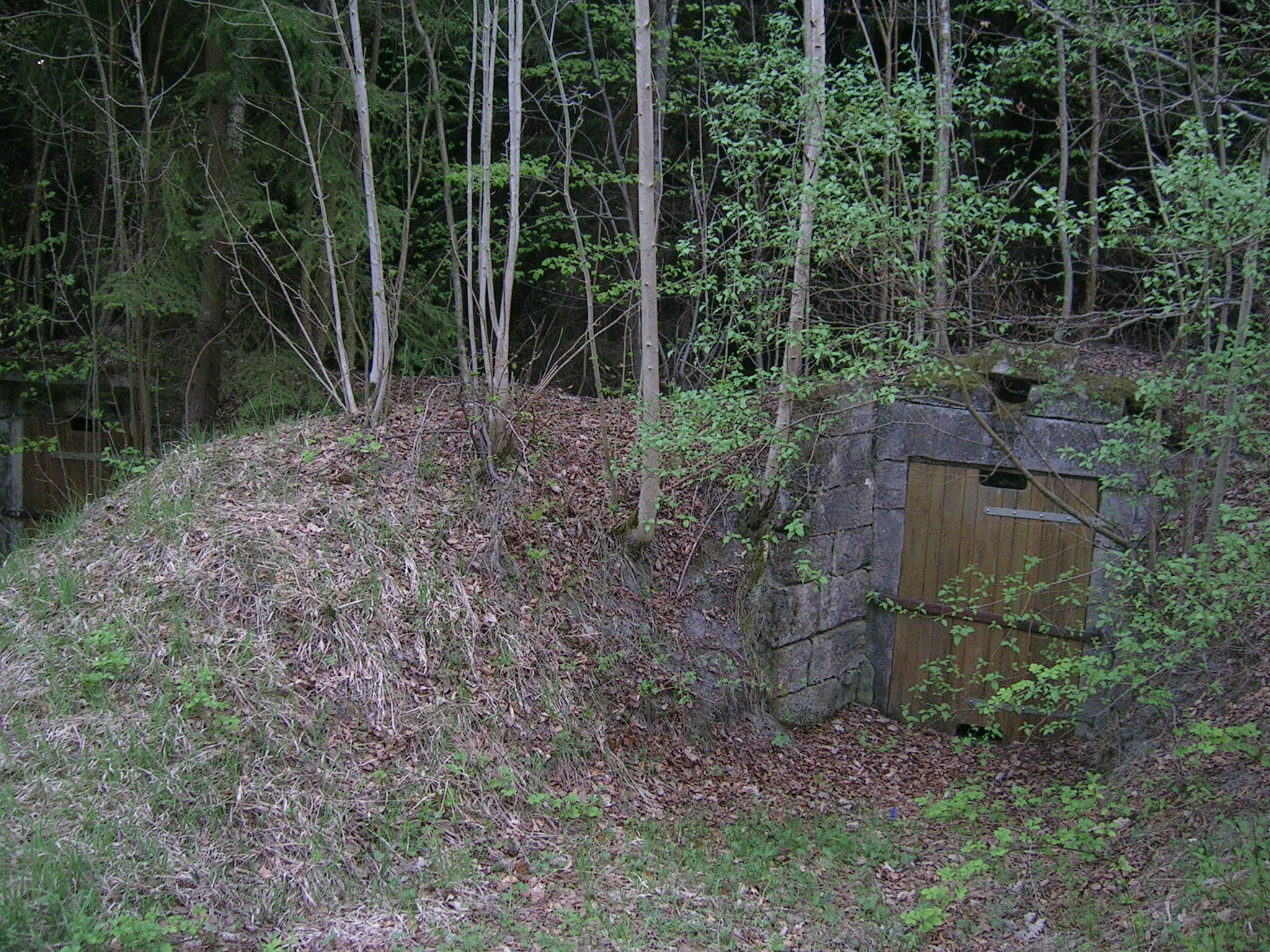
A stone cellar near the desolated village of Erlebach

Erlebach was a village in Germany, founded in 1310 A D. It was destroyed by the East German authorities in 1986 as it stood too close to the Inner German border (part of the larger "Iron Curtain"), the border between the post-war states of East and West Germany. It lay in the extreme south of Thuringia in the district of Hildburghausen, only a few hundred metres away from the Thuringian-Bavarian border.

In December 1986, the last family left the village. After that, all the houses were demolished and the land leveled. What remains is the village pond and a plaque on the old village site.
