= Tear down this wall! =

1987 Ronald Reagan speech in West Berlin

"Tear down this wall"
- Complete speech. The passage "tear down this wall" begins at 11:55 into this video.
- Date: June 12, 1987
- Venue: Near the Brandenburg Gate at the presently named Platz des 18. März
- Location: West Berlin
- Participants: Ronald Reagan
- The full text of the speech at Wikisource

On June 12, 1987, at the Brandenburg Gate, then-United States president Ronald Reagan delivered a speech commonly known by a key line from the middle part: "Mr. Gorbachev, tear down this wall!" Reagan called for Soviet leader Mikhail Gorbachev to open the Berlin Wall, which had encircled West Berlin since 1961.

The following day, The New York Times carried Reagan’s picture on the front page, below the title "Reagan Calls on Gorbachev to Tear Down the Berlin Wall". In the post-Cold War era, it was often seen as one of the most memorable performances of an American president in Berlin after John F. Kennedy's 1963 speech "Ich bin ein Berliner". Reagan's speech was written by Peter Robinson.

== Background ==
The "tear down this wall" speech was not the first time Reagan had addressed the issue of the Berlin Wall. In a visit to West Berlin in June 1982, he stated, "I'd like to ask the Soviet leaders one question [...] Why is the wall there?". In 1986, 25 years after the construction of the wall, in response to West German newspaper Bild-Zeitung asking when he thought the wall could be removed, Reagan said, "I call upon those responsible to dismantle it [today]".

On the day before Reagan's 1987 visit, 50,000 people had demonstrated against the presence of the American president in West Berlin. The city saw the largest police deployment in its history after World War II. During the visit itself, wide swaths of Berlin were closed off to prevent further anti-Reagan protests. The district of Kreuzberg, in particular, was targeted in this respect, with movement throughout this portion of the city in effect restrained completely (for instance the U1 U-Bahn line was shut down). About those demonstrators, Reagan said at the end of his speech: "I wonder if they ever asked themselves that if they should have the kind of government they apparently seek, no one would ever be able to do what they are doing again".

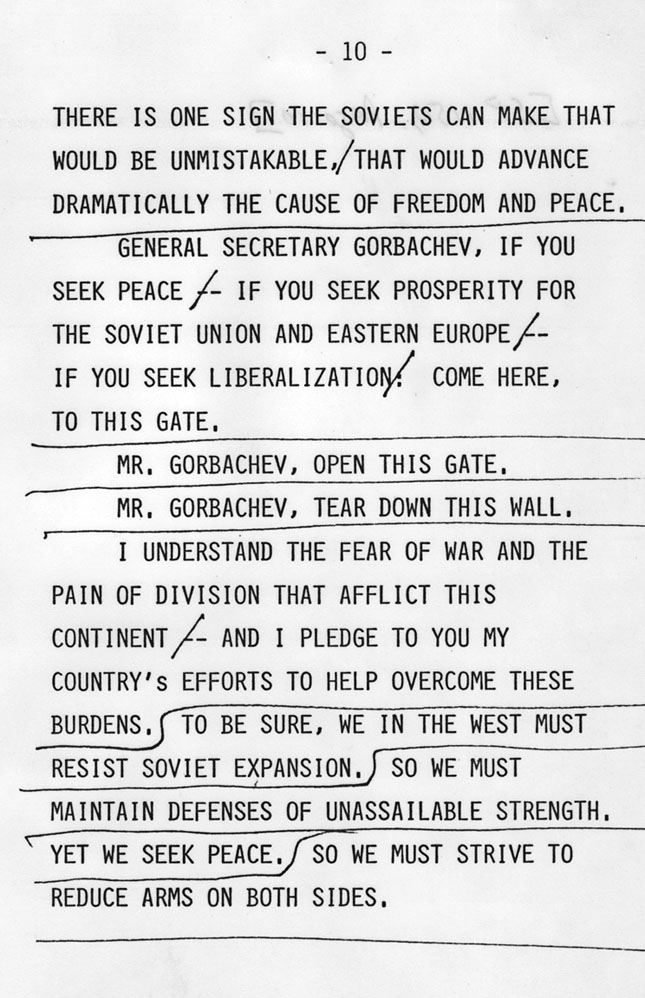
Reagan's cue card with the speech's namesake line

The speech drew controversy within the Reagan administration, with several senior staffers and aides advising against the phrase, saying anything that might cause further East–West tensions or potential embarrassment to Gorbachev, with whom Reagan had built a good relationship, should be omitted. American officials in West Germany and presidential speechwriters, including Peter Robinson, thought otherwise. According to an account by Robinson, he traveled to West Germany to inspect potential speech venues, and gained an overall sense that the majority of West Berliners opposed the wall. Despite getting little support for suggesting Reagan demand the wall's removal, Robinson kept the phrase in the speech text. On Monday, May 18, 1987, Reagan met with his speechwriters and responded to the speech by saying, "I thought it was a good, solid draft." White House Chief of Staff Howard Baker objected, saying it sounded "extreme" and "unpresidential", and Deputy U.S. National Security Advisor Colin Powell agreed. Nevertheless, Reagan liked the passage, saying, "I think we'll leave it in."

Chief speechwriter Anthony Dolan gives another account of the line's origins, however, attributing it directly to Reagan. In an article published in The Wall Street Journal in November 2009, Dolan gives a detailed account of how in an Oval Office meeting that was prior to Robinson's draft Reagan came up with the line on his own. He records impressions of his own reaction and Robinson's at the time. This led to a friendly exchange of letters between Robinson and Dolan over their differing accounts, which The Wall Street Journal published.

== Speech ==
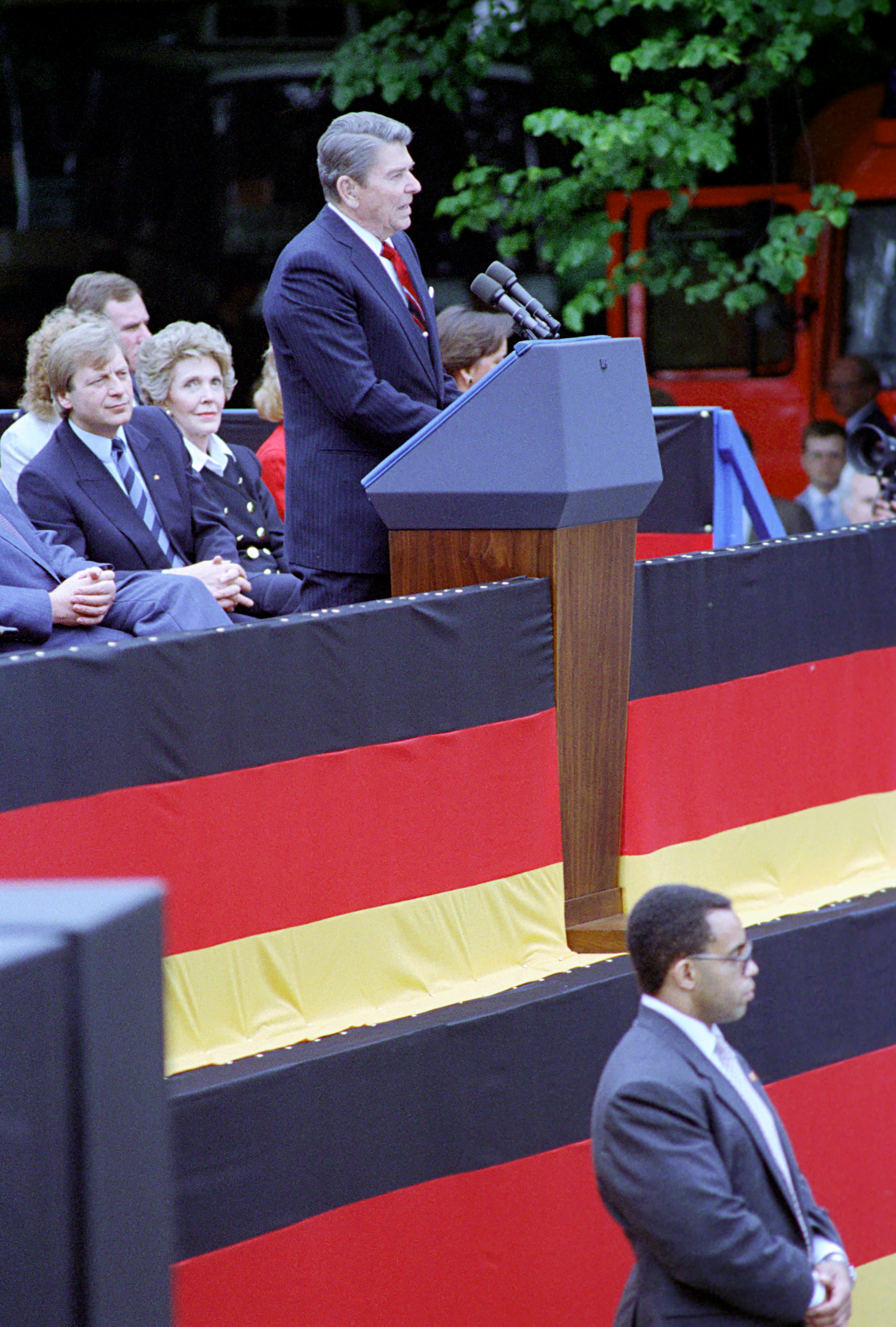
West Berlin mayor Eberhard Diepgen watching the speech

Arriving in Berlin on Friday, June 12, 1987, Reagan and his wife were taken to the Reichstag where they viewed the wall from a balcony. Reagan then gave his speech at the Brandenburg Gate at 2:00 p.m., in front of two panes of bulletproof glass shielding him from East Berlin. Among the spectators were West German president Richard von Weizsäcker, chancellor Helmut Kohl, and West Berlin mayor Eberhard Diepgen. In the speech, he said:

We welcome change and openness; for we believe that freedom and security go together, that the advance of human liberty can only strengthen the cause of world peace. There is one sign the Soviets can make that would be unmistakable, that would advance dramatically the cause of freedom and peace. General Secretary Gorbachev, if you seek peace, if you seek prosperity for the Soviet Union and Eastern Europe, if you seek liberalization: Come here to this gate! Mr. Gorbachev, open this gate! Mr. Gorbachev, tear down this wall!

== Response and legacy ==
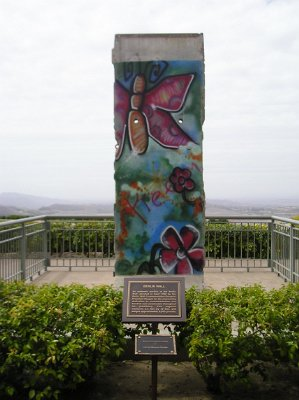
A piece of the Berlin Wall located at the Ronald Reagan Presidential Library

The speech received "relatively little coverage from the media", Time magazine wrote 20 years later. John Kornblum, senior US diplomat in Berlin at the time of Reagan's speech, and US Ambassador to Germany from 1997 to 2001, said "[The speech] wasn't really elevated to its current status until 1989, after the wall came down." East Germany's communist rulers were not impressed, dismissing the speech as "an absurd demonstration by a cold warrior", as later recalled by Politburo member Günter Schabowski. The Soviet press agency TASS accused Reagan of giving an "openly provocative, war-mongering speech."

Former West German Chancellor Helmut Kohl said he would never forget standing near Reagan when he challenged Gorbachev to tear down the Berlin Wall. "He was a stroke of luck for the world, especially for Europe."

In an interview, Reagan said that the East German police did not allow people to come close to the wall, which prevented the citizens from experiencing the speech at all.

Peter Robinson, the White House speech writer who drafted the address, said that the phrase "tear down this wall" was inspired by a conversation with Ingeborg Elz of West Berlin; in a conversation with Robinson, Elz remarked, "If this man Gorbachev is serious with his talk of Glasnost and perestroika he can prove it by getting rid of this wall."

In a September 2012 article in The Atlantic, Liam Hoare pointed to the many reasons for the tendency for American media to focus on the significance of this particular speech, without weighing the complexity of the events as they unfolded in both East and West Germany and the Soviet Union.

Author James Mann disagreed with both critics like Hoare, who saw Reagan's speech as having no real effect, and those who praised the speech as key to shaking Soviet confidence. In a 2007 opinion article in The New York Times, he put the speech in the context of previous Reagan overtures to the Soviet Union, such as the Reykjavik summit of the previous year, which had very nearly resulted in an agreement to eliminate American and Soviet nuclear weapons entirely. He characterized the speech as a way for Reagan to assuage his right-wing critics that he was still tough on communism, while also extending a renewed invitation to Gorbachev to work together to create "the vastly more relaxed climate in which the Soviets sat on their hands when the wall came down." Mann claimed that Reagan "wasn't trying to land a knockout blow on the Soviet regime, nor was he engaging in mere political theater. He was instead doing something else on that damp day in Berlin 20 years [before Mann's article] – he was helping to set the terms for the end of the cold war."

In November 2019, a bronze statue of Reagan was unveiled at the US embassy, near the site of the speech, after the Berlin authorities had refused one to be placed in the city.

== See also ==
- Evil Empire speech
- Speeches and debates of Ronald Reagan
