= Rob Long =

American writer and television producer

- Born: Robert Long; June 8, 1965 (age 60); Maryland, U.S.
- Education: Yale University (BA); University of California, Los Angeles
- Occupations: Screenwriter, producer, author
- Years active: 1990–present

Robert Long (born June 8, 1965) is an American writer and television producer in Hollywood. As a screenwriter and executive producer for the long-running television program Cheers, he received Emmy and Golden Globe nominations in 1992 and 1993. Long created the television show George and Leo, among others. Long received an award from the Writers Guild of America.

In addition to his television work, Long is a contributing editor for National Review, as well as a contributor to publications like TIME, Newsweek International, The Wall Street Journal, and radio host. In May 2010, he took part in launching a new center-right commentary site, Ricochet.

== Education ==
Long graduated from Phillips Academy in 1983 and Yale University in 1987. After graduation, he studied for two years at the UCLA School of Theater, Film and Television, where he later served as an adjunct professor of screenwriting

== Television career ==
Long started his career as a screenwriter for the television show Cheers in 1990, and became an executive producer for the show in 1992. During his tenure, the show won two Emmys and two Golden Globes. Long received Emmy and Golden Globe nominations in 1992 and 1993.

After Cheers ended in 1993, Long formed a television production company with his Cheers collaborator and fellow Emmy nominee Dan Staley. Together, they created the television show George and Leo, starring Bob Newhart and Judd Hirsch, for CBS. They also created Love & Money for CBS and Men, Women & Dogs for The WB. In addition to their show creation work, Long and his partner served as creative consultants on numerous shows. Long took over as show runner for Kevin James vehicle Kevin Can Wait after Bruce Helford left the CBS show.

== Political and social commentary ==
Beginning in 1993, Long wrote a fortnightly political satire column for National Review titled Letters from Al. Written anonymously, the majority of these columns purported to be personal letters from Vice President Al Gore to his friend "Rusty", an academic researcher living in a Brazilian rainforest. The letters revealed insider information about government figures, as well as humorous speculation on their roles in public controversies. Occasionally the letters were from other political figures, such as George Bush and Dick Morris, and on occasion the column purported to be the transcript of a police wiretap. National Review maintained the author's anonymity throughout the Clinton presidency, revealing Long's identity only after George Bush was inaugurated in 2001.

Long is now a contributing editor for National Review, where he writes the fortnightly column The Long View. He comments on political and social topics, especially mass media and Hollywood politics. He is also a contributor to TIME, Newsweek International, The Wall Street Journal, and the Los Angeles Times.

Long hosts the syndicated radio show Martini Shot, where he provides news and opinion on the film industry, as well as interviews with notable subjects. Broadcast weekly, the show originates at Los Angeles NPR station KCRW. The show's title is a Hollywood term for the final scene of the day on a film production set. In addition, Long regularly appears on political commentary shows.

=== Ricochet ===
In 2008, Long started a political news and commentary website, RobinsonandLong.com, in collaboration with Peter Robinson, author and former speechwriter for Ronald Reagan. In 2010, Robinson and Long launched a new, more interactive website, Ricochet, featuring a news feed in the model of Facebook, Twitter, or Tumblr. The site features approximately 40 contributors from conservative publications, such as National Review and The Weekly Standard, who start conversation threads open to commentary and discussion. In order to encourage earnest and respectful discussion, only paying members of the site are allowed to comment, and a code of conduct is enforced.

== Other work ==
Long is the author of two books. His first, Conversations with My Agent, is a memoir of his early career. Published in 1998, it provides extensive advice for aspiring scriptwriters, and has become a "cult classic". His second book, Set Up, Joke, Set Up, Joke, is a further memoir of his entertainment industry experiences, and was published in 2005.

Long is mentioned and quoted extensively in the book The Sound of No Hands Clapping by Toby Young.

Long serves on the board of directors of The American Cinema Foundation, a "Los Angeles-based non-profit arts organization created to nurture and reward television and feature-film projects that promote democratic pluralism and inclusion." His published works include Conversations with My Agent and Set Up, Joke, Set Up, Joke. He is also president of the Board of Directors of the Southern Foodways Alliance.

== Associated television shows ==
- Cheers (1990–1993)
- Pig Sty (1995)
- Good Company (1996)
- George and Leo (1997–1998)
- Love & Money (1999)
- Men, Women & Dogs (2001–2002)
- Sullivan & Son (2012–2014)
- Kevin Can Wait (2016–2018)

== Published works ==
- Conversations with My Agent (1998) ISBN 0-452-27713-2
- Set Up, Joke, Set Up, Joke (2005) ISBN 0-747-54777-7
- Bigly: Donald Trump in Verse (2017)

== Awards and nominations ==
- Nomination, Primetime Emmy Award (1992)
- Nomination, Primetime Emmy Award (1993)
- Nomination, Golden Globe Award (1992)
- Nomination, Golden Globe Award (1993)
- Writers Guild of America Award

== See also ==
- Cheers
- Sullivan & Son
- George & Leo
- KCRW
