= Ricochet (website) =

Conservative website

- Website type: Politics, conservatism
- Available in: English
- Founded: 2010
- Founders: Rob Long and Peter Robinson
- Website: ricochet.com

Ricochet is an online community portal founded as a "politics website intended to resemble Facebook and Twitter". It is a subscription site which has articles posted by contributors and members on which members can comment and discuss the issues raised. The site describes itself as a place for "center-right conversation" and is listed on a libertarian website as being for "Conservative/National Review Types". Members pay a fee to post and comment on the website.

The site was established in May 2010 and founded by Rob Long and Peter Robinson. Its flagship podcast is hosted by Long, Robinson, and Minneapolis writer James Lileks. Bethany Mandel is one of the current editors. Past editors have included Mollie Hemingway and Claire Berlinski.

Ricochet serves as a host for conservative podcasts including ones produced by National Review. In 2016, the site grouped its podcasts into the Ricochet Network which can be downloaded on a group feed. Some of the podcasts are hosted or led by conservative-leaning figures such as Bill Bennett, James Delingpole, Richard Epstein, Erick Erickson, Jim Geraghty, Jonah Goldberg, Victor Davis Hanson, Steve Hayward, Andrew Klavan, Jay Nordlinger, Larry O'Connor, John Podhoretz, Byron York, John Yoo, and Toby Young.

Ricochet is hosted by Astroluxe Innovations, a tech firm co-founded by National Review writer, Charles C. W. Cooke.
