= Peter Robinson (speechwriter) =

American author and TV host (born 1957)

Speechwriter for the White House
- In office 1983–1988
- President: Ronald Reagan

Chief Speechwriter for the Vice President
- In office 1982–1983
- Vice President: George H. W. Bush

Personal details
- Born: Peter Mark Robinson; April 18, 1957 (age 69) Vestal, New York, U.S.
- Education: Dartmouth College (BA); Christ Church, Oxford (BA); Stanford University (MBA)
- Known for: Berlin Wall Speech Uncommon Knowledge

Peter Mark Robinson (born April 18, 1957) is an American author, research fellow, television host and former speechwriter for then-Vice President George H. W. Bush and President Ronald Reagan. He is the founder and host of Uncommon Knowledge, an interview show by Stanford's Hoover Institution. He is also a research fellow at the Hoover Institution, and a co-founder of the Ricochet website.

== Early life and education ==
Robinson grew up in Vestal, New York. He attended Dartmouth College from 1975 to 1979, where he was a member of Tri-Kap, and wrote for The Dartmouth. He majored in English and graduated summa cum laude, then continued his studies at Christ Church, Oxford, pursuing a second bachelor's degree in philosophy, politics and economics and graduating in 1982. Robinson also attended the Stanford Graduate School of Business. He graduated with an M.B.A. in 1990.

== Uncommon Knowledge ==
Robinson is the host of Uncommon Knowledge, a political podcast at the Hoover Institution at Stanford University. The show has featured guests like Thomas Sowell, Benjamin Netanyahu, and Henry Kissinger, and it delves into topics such as public policy, history, geopolitics, and economics.

== Speechwriter ==
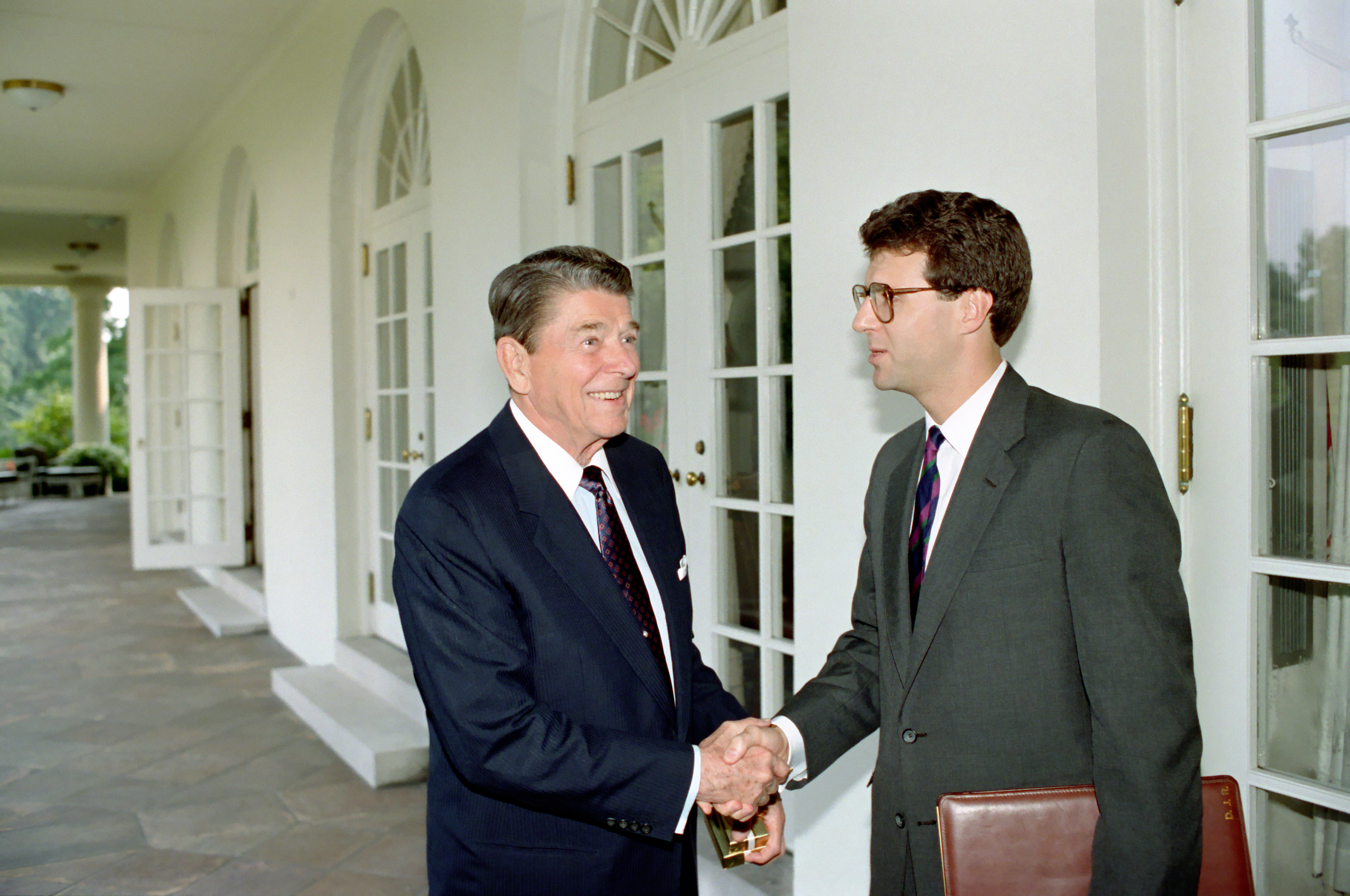
Robinson at the White House with President Ronald Reagan in 1988

After Oxford, Robinson applied for a position at the White House. In an event he describes as a "fluke", he was given a job as the chief speechwriter for Vice President Bush. In what he calls a "second fluke", he was then transferred to President Reagan's staff as a special assistant and speechwriter, where he wrote the famed 1987 "Tear down this wall" address. Referencing Soviet General Secretary Mikhail Gorbachev's refusal to remove the Berlin Wall, the speech, delivered by Reagan at the Brandenburg Gate in West Berlin on 12 June 1987, contained the sentence: "Mr. Gorbachev, tear down this wall!"

On arrival in the city before writing the speech, Robinson was warned by US diplomats to avoid Cold War rhetoric and that Berliners had adjusted to the presence of the Berlin Wall. However, after consultation with local Berliners, he found them deeply wounded and concerned about the wall; in many instances it had separated families and represented an intrusion of a police state into daily life. Returning to Washington D.C., Robinson's phrase became controversial with the State Department and other staff members, including Chief of Staff Howard Baker and National Security Advisor Colin Powell. Repeated attempts were made to remove it from the speech, but Reagan overruled them, wishing to communicate not only with West Berliners but with East Germans on the other side of the wall. Reagan went so far as to say "yes, this wall will fall", and that "As long as this gate is closed, as long as this scar of a wall is permitted to stand, it is not the German question alone that remains open, but the question of freedom for all mankind."

External videos
- Booknotes interview with Robinson on Snapshots from Hell, December 18, 1994, C-SPAN

Robinson wrote more than 300 speeches during his White House tenure. After serving for six years, Robinson attended business school at Stanford University where he earned a Master of Business Administration in 1990. The journal he kept of his two-year experience there was the basis for his book Snapshots from Hell: The Making of an MBA, published in 1994, which details the considerable difficulty he encountered during the first year of business school due to his lack of a "quantitative background".

== Research fellow ==
External videos
- Presentation by Robinson on It's My Party, September 14, 2000, C-SPAN
- Presentation by Robinson on How Ronald Reagan Changed My Life, August 6, 2003, C-SPAN

In the early 1990s, Robinson joined the News Corporation run by Rupert Murdoch, and then served as press secretary to the Chairman of the Securities and Exchange Commission. In 1993, Robinson became a research fellow at the Hoover Institution, Stanford's conservative research center. In addition to writing about business and politics, he also edits the Hoover Digest and hosted a PBS public affairs television program Uncommon Knowledge, later re-branded as a Web cast at hoover.org, and then arranged to be released semiweekly on National Review Online. He has written How Ronald Reagan Changed My Life and It's My Party: A Republican's Messy Love Affair with the GOP, a study of the Republican Party.

He served on the Board of Trustees of Dartmouth College from 2005 to 2013.

== Personal life and writings ==
Robinson lives in northern California with his wife, Edita, and their five children. Edita's parents left Cuba in 1959 and she was born about 18 months later.

In 2003, he published his third book, How Ronald Reagan Changed My Life. He has stated that it is "nothing less than a love story – an account of the profound respect and affection that one young man came to feel for the President who changed his life forever." The book received a favorable review from Margaret Thatcher, and she remarked that it features a "wealth of insights".
