= Jeffrey Hart =

American cultural critic (1930–2019)

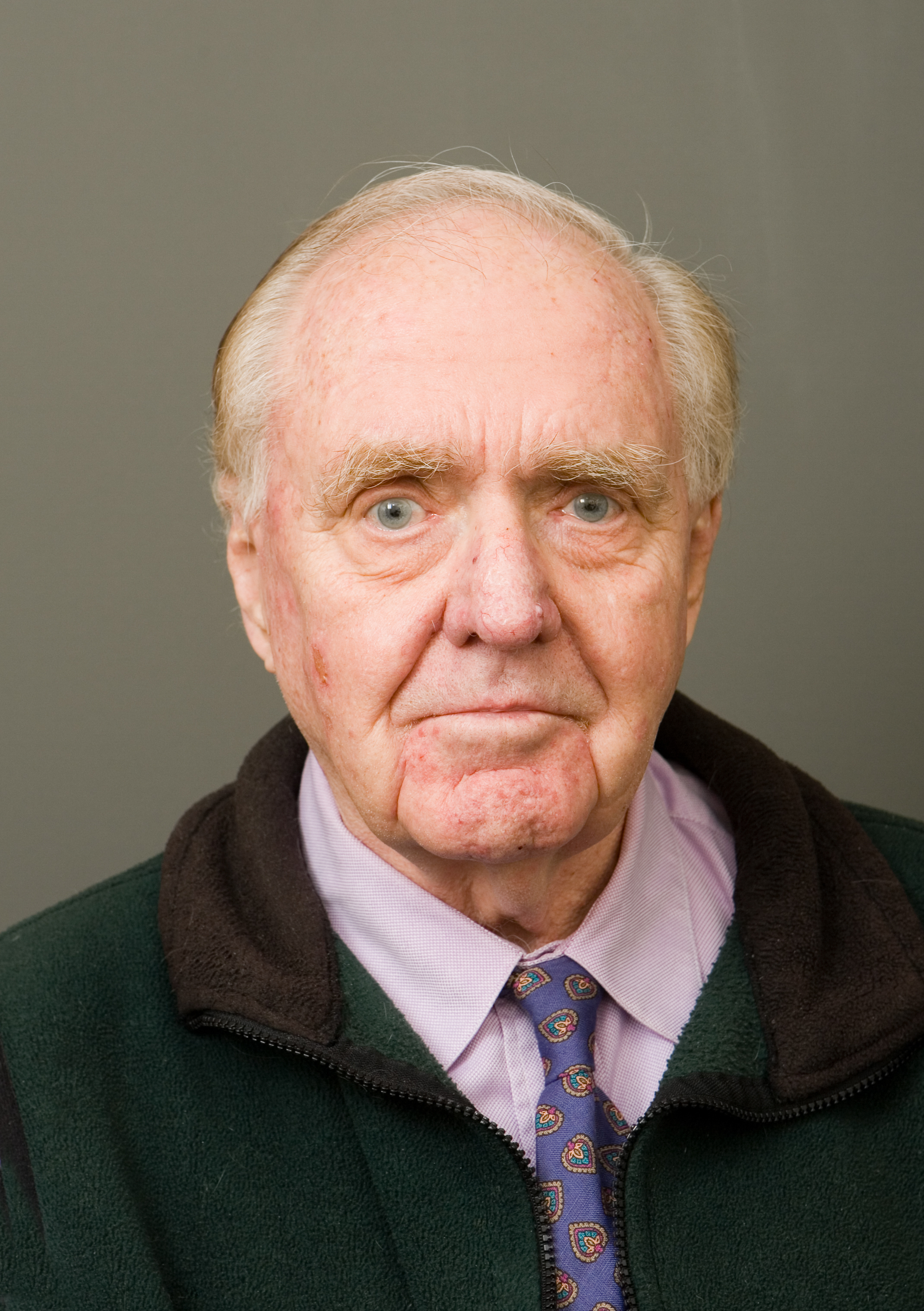
- Hart in 2006
- Born: Jeffrey Peter Hart; February 23, 1930; Brooklyn, New York, U.S.
- Died: February 16, 2019 (aged 88); Fairlee, Vermont, U.S.
- Education: Dartmouth College; Columbia University (BA, PhD)
- Occupations: Cultural critic; essayist; columnist; professor
- Years active: 1963–1993
- Employers: Dartmouth College; National Review
- Title: Professor emeritus
- Political party: Republican

Jeffrey Peter Hart (February 23, 1930 – February 16, 2019) was an American cultural critic, essayist, columnist, and Professor Emeritus of English at Dartmouth College.

== Early life and education ==
Hart was born and raised in Brooklyn, New York. After two years as an undergraduate at Dartmouth, he transferred to Columbia University, where he joined the Philolexian Society and obtained his B.A. (1952) and Ph.D., both in English literature.

During the Korean War he served in U.S. Naval Intelligence in Boston.

== Career ==
After a short period teaching at Columbia, Hart became Professor of English literature at Dartmouth for three decades (1963–1993). Hart specialized in 18th century literature but also had a fondness for modernist literature. His political contrarianism annoyed his faculty colleagues; when they were concerned about fossil fuels he made it a point to commute to campus in a Cadillac limousine.

In 1962 he joined William F. Buckley's conservative journal National Review as a book reviewer, requiring a trip from Hanover, New Hampshire to New York City every other week. Later, he contributed as a writer and senior editor for the better part of the ensuing three decades, even as he fulfilled his teaching responsibilities as a professor at Dartmouth.

Hart took a leave of absence from Dartmouth in 1968 to work for the abortive presidential campaign of Governor of California Ronald Reagan. This role led him to briefly serve as a White House speechwriter for Richard Nixon. After nomination by his former student Reggie Williams, Hart was honored with his college's Outstanding Teaching Award in 1992. He also received the Young America's Foundation Engalitcheff Prize in 1996, among other academic accolades. In 1998, he served as a visiting lecturer at Nichols College.

The Dartmouth Review was founded in his living room in 1980, and he served as an adviser to it until his death. He wrote a regular column for King Features Syndicate and retired from teaching.

He launched a Burkean critique of the policies of President George W. Bush in the pages of the American Conservative, the Washington Monthly, and The Wall Street Journal. Hart supported John Kerry in the 2004 election and Barack Obama in 2008.

== Death ==
He died on February 16, 2019, at age 88.

== Publications ==
External videos
- Booknotes interview with Hart on Smiling Through the Cultural Catastrophe, January 13, 2002, C-SPAN
- Presentation by Hart on The Making of the American Conservative Mind, February 9, 2006, C-SPAN

- Burke, Edmund (1964). Jeffrey Hart (ed.). Speech on conciliation with the Colonies. Edited, with an introductory essay by Jeffrey Hart. A Gateway edition. Chicago: H. Regnery Co. LCCN 63020521. OCLC 1116479.
- Hart, Jeffrey Peter (1964). Political writers of eighteenth-century England (1st ed.). New York: Knopf. LCCN 63020863.
- Hart, Jeffrey Peter (1965). Viscount Bolingbroke, Tory humanist. London: Routledge & K. Paul. LCCN 66000209. OCLC 401312.
- "Raspail's Superb Scandal". Review of The Camp of the Saints by Jean Raspail. National Review, Vol. 27, September 26, 1975, pp. 1062–1063.
- When the Going was Good: Life in the Fifties (1982)
- From This Moment On: America in 1940 (1987)
- Hart, Jeffrey Peter (1989). Acts of recovery : essays on culture and politics. Hanover, N.H.: University Press of New England. ISBN 0-87451-504-1. "In honor of Lionel Trilling"
- Hart, Jeffrey (October 13, 2000). "Dartmouth review is of the utmost importance". Arlington, Virginia: Alexis de Tocqueville Institution. Archived from the original on June 1, 2006.
- Smiling Through the Cultural Catastrophe: Toward the Revival of Higher Education (2001)
- The Making of the American Conservative Mind: National Review and Its Times (2006)
- Hart, Jeffrey (June 16, 2007). "The Decade That Roared – These works are essential to appreciating American literature of the 1920s". Opinion Journal.
- Hart, Jeffrey (December 27, 2007). "The Burke Habit – Prudence, skepticism and "unbought grace."". Opinion Journal. "Without a deep knowledge of history, policy analysis is feckless."
