= Alexis de Tocqueville Award =

The Alexis de Tocqueville Award may refer to a number of awards named after the prominent Frenchman who wrote Democracy in America. The current known awards include:

- The Alexis de Tocqueville award awarded by the Independent Institute
- The Alexis de Tocqueville Award for Excellence in Advancement of Educational Freedom awarded by the Alliance for the Separation of School & State
- The Alexis de Tocqueville award awarded by the Alexis de Tocqueville Institute, an institute accused of using research to get results predefined by its sponsors
- The Alexis de Tocqueville Award awarded to alumni by the School of Diplomacy and International Relations at Seton Hall University
