= Samizdat: And Other Issues Regarding the 'Source' of Open Source Code =

Controversial book on open-source software

- Author: Kenneth Brown
- Subject: Linux kernel
- Publication date: 2004
- Publication place: United States

Samizdat: And Other Issues Regarding the 'Source' of Open Source Code is a 2004 report by Kenneth Brown. The report suggests that the Linux kernel may have been created or distributed illegally and that open-source software may be generally subject to such abuses.

The report states that the Linux kernel was written using copied source code from Minix and other resources acquired improperly or possibly illegally by Linus Torvalds. It also suggests that one can never be certain of the origins of open source code, so similar misuse of copyrighted code may exist for other open-source projects. Finally, it asserts that the GNU General Public License is bad for the economy.

The book was greeted with widespread rejection by the technical world and was repudiated by many of its claimed sources.

The prerelease has long been delisted from the distributor's site and the book was never given a proper release, although the prerelease PDF is available online.

== Arguments of the book ==
The title is a reference to samizdat, a form of private circulation of suppressed literature within Soviet-bloc countries, and by extension slang for papers that contain programming techniques and code, sometimes from sources that have not authorized publication, which are often passed from programmer to programmer. Samizdat claims that Linus Torvalds used source code taken from Minix, a small Unix-like operating system used in teaching computer science, to create Linux 0.01, on the theory that no mere student could write an entire Unix-like kernel single-handedly.

The book also recommends that government-funded programming should never be licensed under the GPL, but under the BSD license or similar simple permissive licenses. It states that the US government should:

- "Work vigorously to create a true 'free source' code capability program at universities and colleges. This program should go to promote true open source projects, not hybrid source projects like the GPL and Linus [sic]. The federal government should support a $5 billion budget over ten years to produce a free source code project in partnership with the IT industry and other governments interested in promoting increased computers [sic] science research and development. This effort would be a benefit to academia, the private sector, and the IT economy."
- "Actively study the taxpayer return on investment (TORI0) [sic] from government funded governmental research and development at colleges and universities."
- "Increase the US Patent and Trademark Office budget to properly support the anticipated growth in intellectual property filings by the public as a result of the 'open source' program at colleges and universities."
- "Increase financial incentives for corporations to participate in an open source program at colleges and universities."

== Reaction to Samizdat ==
The book's claims, methodology and references have been seriously questioned, including by many of those it quotes in support of its thesis, such as Andrew S. Tanenbaum, author of Minix; Dennis Ritchie, one of the creators of Unix; and Richard Stallman, leader of the GNU project. Others have said that quotes attributed as being from an "interview with AdTI" were in fact from prerelease journal papers (Ilkka Tuomi) or from messageboard posts (Charles Mills, Henry Jones).

Alexey Toptygin said he had been commissioned by Brown to find similarities between Minix and Linux 0.01 source code, and found no support for the theory that Minix source code had been used to create Linux; this study is not mentioned in the book. Toptygin has been quoted as saying that he had been asked by a friend

... if I wanted to do some code analysis on a consultancy basis for his boss, Kenneth Brown. I ended up doing about 10 hours of work, comparing early versions of Linux and Minix, looking for copied code. To summarize, my analysis found no evidence whatsoever that any code was copied. When I called him to ask if he had any questions about the analysis methods or results, and to ask if he would like to have it repeated with other source comparison tools, I was in for a bit of a shock. Apparently, Ken was expecting me to find gobs of copied source code. He spent most of the conversation trying to convince me that I must have made a mistake, since it was clearly impossible for one person to write an OS and 'code theft' had to have occurred.

Although Linux 0.01 was written using Minix as an example and starting point – Minix had been created by Tanenbaum as an example for study – no code from Minix was actually used in it; Tanenbaum himself agrees on this point, and stated as much in an interview with Ken Brown while the latter was researching Samizdat. Furthermore, Linux 0.01 was a barely functional first draft, far from the sophisticated, industry-grade Linux-based operating systems it would later grow into.

Samizdat's detractors also point to the fact that AdTI has been funded directly since 1999 by Microsoft, a company which publishes the competing proprietary operating system Microsoft Windows, and considered Linux one of its most important competitors at the time (see Halloween documents § Documents I and II).

After a month of widespread rejection of the book in the technical press, Microsoft also repudiated it in mid-June, a spokesman calling it "an unhelpful distraction from what matters most—providing the best technology for our customers".

Notably absent from Brown's research for Samizdat was any direct communication with Torvalds.

== See also ==
- Halloween documents
