= 1985–1986 Dartmouth College anti-apartheid protests =

Protests in Hanover, New Hampshire, US

- Part of the anti-apartheid movement in the United States
- Date: November 1985 – February 1986
- Location: Dartmouth College, Hanover, New Hampshire, United States
- Goals: A complete divestment of the university from companies doing business in South Africa

Parties
Dartmouth Committee for Divestment	Dartmouth Committee to Beautify the Green Before Winter Carnival; The Dartmouth Review	Administrators of Dartmouth College

Lead figures
		President David T. McLaughlin

Beginning in 1985, student activists at Dartmouth College, a private university in Hanover, New Hampshire, protested against the university's policy of investing in companies that operated in South Africa. The protests were part of a wider anti-apartheid movement in the United States that sought to disinvest from South Africa in protest against the country's policy of apartheid.

In November 1985, an activist group called the Dartmouth Committee for Divestment (DCD) erected a shanty town on the Green in order to draw attention to the poor living conditions experienced by black people in South Africa. While university administrators initially called for the shanties to be removed from the Green, University President David T. McLaughlin stated that the shanties could remain so long as they served "an educational purpose". Over the next several months, the shanties remained while the DCD continued to push for full divestment from companies doing business in South Africa.

On January 21, 1986, a group consisting of several staff members of The Dartmouth Review—a conservative student publication—attacked the shanty town in an effort to destroy and remove the structures from the Green. In response to the attack, anti-apartheid activists performed an occupation of an administration building on campus. As part of an agreement reached with the occupiers, administrators canceled classes later that week and held a teach-in to discuss racial sensitivity topics. Several days later, McLaughlin ordered the shanties removed from the Green, with several anti-apartheid activists arrested during the removal process, with most charged with trespassing. While the university ultimately dropped its charges against these students, they suspended the students who had attacked the shanty town. Later litigation reduced or removed some of these students' sentences.

While anti-apartheid protesting occurred at many universities in the United States around the same time, the Dartmouth activities were notable for their scale, with political activist L.A. Kauffman calling it "[t]he most notorious incident" to occur during the divestment movement of the 1980s. While initially focused on opposition to apartheid, several commentators have noted that the protests highlighted existing issues at the university regarding discrimination. In the later half of 1986, several universities divested their holdings from South African companies and the federal government outlawed new investing in South African companies that were not black-owned.

== Background ==
=== Anti-apartheid protests at American colleges and universities ===
According to historian Amanda Joyce Hall, opposition to apartheid in South Africa "was one of the longest continuous youth movements of the twentieth century". Beginning with the introduction of that system in 1948, opposition to it originated with African American anticolonial activism. In the 1960s and 1970s, the focus of these protests shifted to boycotting South African goods and pushing for disinvestment from the country. These included investments from universities in the form of endowments and faculty pension funds in stocks for companies that had operations in South Africa. By the late 1970s, this amounted to several hundred million United States dollars. The disinvestment campaign reached its peak in the mid-1980s, with protests occurring at over 200 colleges and universities across the United States.

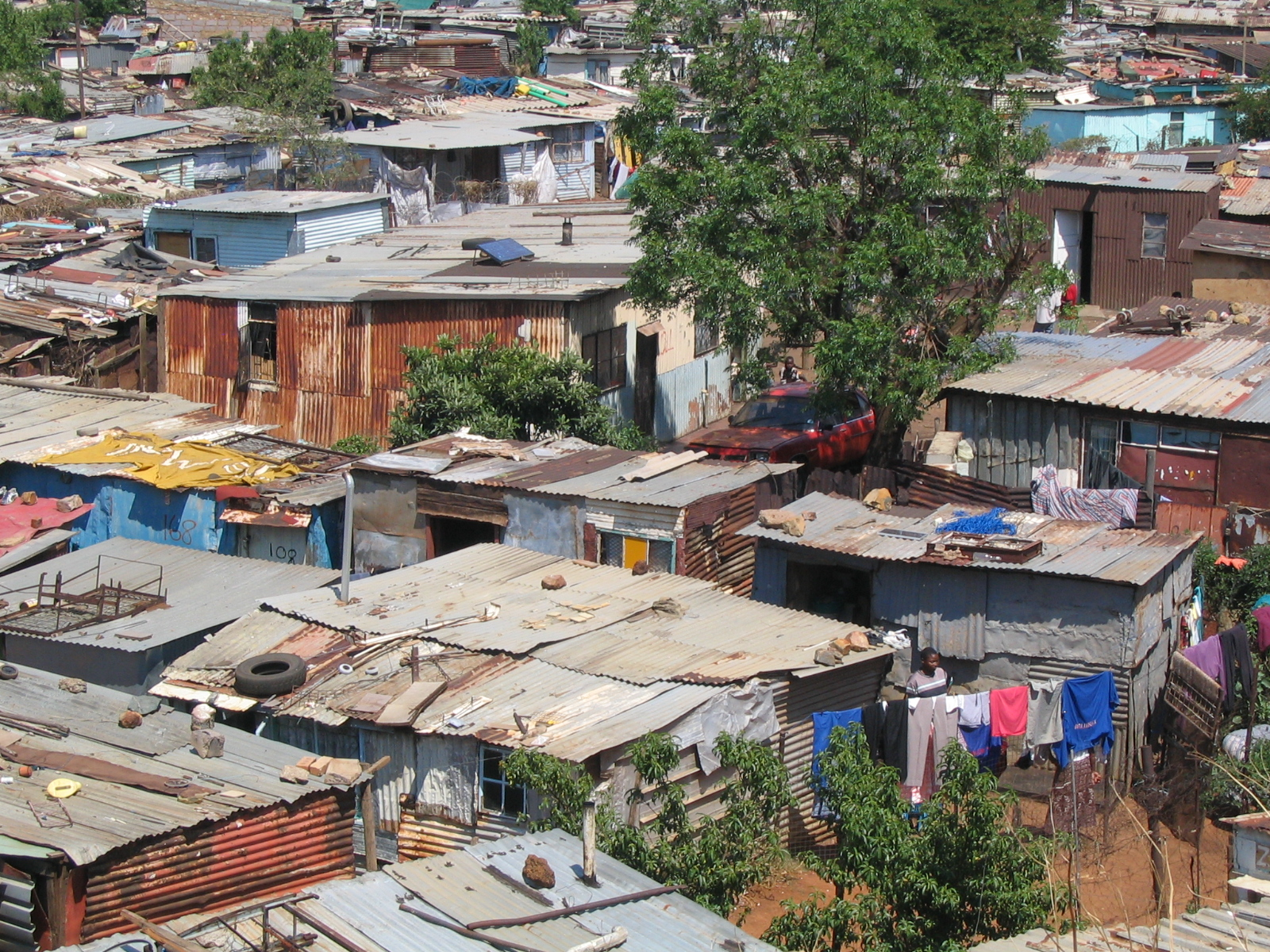
A shanty town in Soweto, 2005

The protests took many forms, including picketing and renaming public spaces, but a common tactic employed was the creation of shanty towns to represent the poor living conditions of black people under apartheid. According to sociologist Sarah Soule, the shanty towns as a form of protest evolved from the sit-ins that were employed during the civil rights movement of the 1960s. During the mid-1980s, sit-ins at several universities grew in size and scale to include "sit-outs" and "camp-outs", where a large number of student activists assembled in public areas of their campuses. In 1985, activists at Princeton University built a dedicated building for protesting, and by Spring 1985, the first shanty town was erected at Cornell University. Within a few months, shanty towns had been erected at several other campuses.

=== Dartmouth College ===
Dartmouth College is an Ivy League university in Hanover, New Hampshire, that, in the mid-1980s, had an undergraduate enrollment of about 4,300. In June 1985, the university's board of trustees amended their policy regarding the college's portfolio, stating that they would divest from any company doing business in South Africa by July 1, 1986, unless that company had agreed to abide by the Sullivan principles. Per reporting from the Dartmouth Alumni Magazine, the trustees felt that full divestment from all companies doing business in South Africa was not an advisable route for advocating for social change in the country, but was committed to partial divestment, as had occurred in April 1985, when the trustees sold stocks in two companies, equal to about $2 million (equivalent to $6 million in 2025), that were operating in that country and were not adhering to the college's policies. At the time, roughly a quarter of the college's financial endowment of $434 million ($1.3 billion in 2025) was invested in companies that had operations in South Africa.

== Pro-divestment protests ==
=== Construction of a shanty town on the Green ===
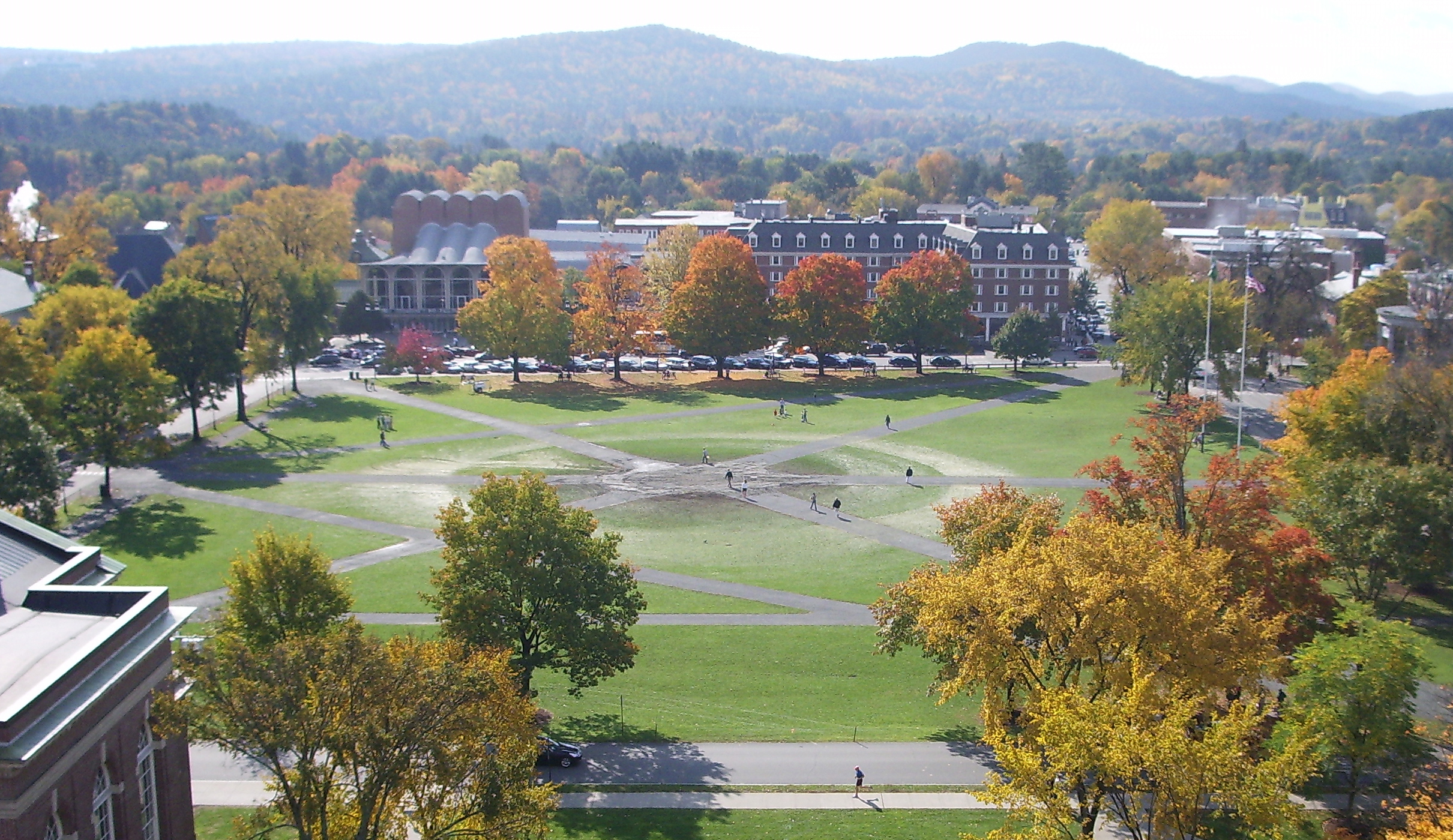
Protestors built a shanty town on the Green (pictured 2007) to raise awareness of the poor living conditions of black people in South Africa.

On November 12, 1985, the college held a forum to debate the policy of divestment. This came several days before the trustees were planning to gather at the college to discuss their divestment policies over the weekend of November 14 and 15. On November 15, a group known as the Dartmouth Committee for Divestment (DCD) began to construct a mock shanty town on the Green. The town consisted of two structures made of scrap wood and sheet metal. The protests at Dartmouth were part of a wider trend of shanty towns being constructed on college campuses across the United States, with similar incidents occurring at Cornell University and Princeton University. The same day that the shanties were erected, a pro-divestment rally was held on the Green that was attended by about 120 people. Over the weekend, trustees met with several members of the DCD to discuss divestment.

=== Further activities through 1985 ===
On November 17, Edward Shanahan, Dartmouth's dean, announced that the shanty town would be destroyed by the university if the structures were not removed from the Green. Shanahan made the announcement while David T. McLaughlin, Dartmouth's president, was away from the college. However, the following day, the DCD began construction on a third shanty and held a rally on the Green that attracted over 300 people. Around that same time, a petition in support of the shanty town received the signatures of 45 faculty members. By the end of the week, McLaughlin had returned and announced that the shanties could remain standing on the Green "as long as they are serving an educational purpose". Following the announcement, educational events around the shanties included a faculty-led teach-in and a speech given by Mpho Tutu—the daughter of South African Nobel Peace Prize laureate Desmond Tutu—that was attended by about 300 people. Additionally, there were plans for forums on divestment scheduled for January 31 and February 1.

On November 26, at McLaughlin's invitation, about 20 members of the DCD held a meeting with him, and on December 4, another meeting was held that included McLaughlin, members of the DCD, and several trustees. According to Dartmouth Alumni Magazine, the latter meeting "appeared to go well". On December 9, the trustees announced that they had further amended their policies so that companies they had investments in would have to demonstrate that they were actively implementing the Sullivan principles by the end of 1986 or face divestment. In a statement made following the announcement, McLaughlin said,

The Dartmouth Community for Divestment activities on the College Green have contributed to increased awareness within the Upper Valley region to the intolerable political and social conditions that exist in South Africa... While the Trustees... have elected other ways to express our institutional position, it is important to respect the freedom of expression for all parties as long as that right is exercised in a responsible manner.

=== Continued protesting in 1986 ===
By the beginning of 1986, there were four shanties located on the Green. In early January, the shanty town was relocated to another section of the Green in order to make room for an ice sculpture that would be part of the college's 76th annual Winter Carnival, which was slated to begin on February 6. This relocation was agreed to by the DCD after discussions with the carnival organizers.

On January 9, a group of 26 pro-divestment protestors held a sit-in at the president's office. McLaughlin, who was having a meeting with a reporter from The New York Times, immediately left his office while the protestors stayed for 234 minutes, which they said represented the number in United States dollars that was allocated to black people by the government of Pretoria per capita per year. Shanahan was critical of the protestors, who he insinuated may face disciplinary action, and said that the disruption jeopardized the forums that were planned for January and February. On the same day, several faculty members published an open letter that was critical of McLaughlin's leadership. Four days later, eighty faculty members voted unanimously to urge the trustees to divest of South African holdings and to speed up the process of review.

By mid-January, the college still held about $63 million ($185 million in 2025) in investments in companies that were doing business in South Africa. While the faculty had voted unanimously for complete divestment, the administration remained opposed. Additionally, The Dartmouth Review, a conservative student newspaper, expressed their opposition to the pro-divestment movement. The Dartmouth Review had been established at the university in the early 1980s and had attracted considerable controversy, with Margot Hornblower of The Washington Post saying that the newspaper was "a focal point for complaints of insensitivity" and fellow Post journalist Sidney Blumenthal saying it was "the most prominent and controversial of the more than 50 conservative student newspapers across the country". Concerning the positions of the newspaper staff and DCD activists, Matthew L. Wald of The New York Times said, "The Review and the divestment group seem to be fighting over the college's identity, from opposite directions."

On January 20, during the first national celebration of Martin Luther King Jr. Day, students and faculty members held a candlelight march at the shanty town. McLaughlin was away from the college at the time, as he was visiting alumni clubs in Florida.

=== Attack on the shanty town ===
On January 21, shortly before 3 a.m. EST, 12 individuals drove a flatbed truck onto the Green. The people, wielding sledgehammers, began destroying the shanties, severely damaging three of the four. Two protestors were sleeping in one of the shanties during the attack, and while they were uninjured, they said that they were verbally threatened by the attackers. The attackers were eventually stopped by college security guards. The two protestors called the police, who took the 12 attackers to the campus's police headquarters. The police did not file any criminal charges against the 12, with Police Captain William Moore stating that further disciplinary action against the vandals would be handled by college officials. A spokesperson for the college stated that they were investigating the matter.

Later that day, a group known as the Dartmouth Committee to Beautify the Green Before Winter Carnival claimed responsibility for the attack. This committee had been formed on January 17 as a project of The Dartmouth Review, with 10 of the 12 people arrested being members of the newspaper's staff. Additionally, the committee's spokesperson, Deborah Stone, was the newspaper's managing editor. Defending the committee's actions, Stone said in a statement, "The members of this committee are not trying to stifle debate on campus. We are merely picking trash up off the green and restoring pride and sparkle to the college we love so much." Stone would go on to say that the committee "does not believe that the structures on the green constitute an allowable protest". The group stated that they had rented the truck and intended to haul off the scrap wood and donate it to charities in the upper Connecticut River valley area to be used as fuel for heating stoves. Stone also said that the group had chosen to take down the shanties at night in order to avoid any physical confrontation with DCD protestors or other students. Concerning the group that attacked the shanties, Roland Reynolds, the newspaper's editor, described them "the Bernhard Goetz of Dartmouth". Will Horter, a spokesperson for DCD, accused the attackers of racism, pointing out that the attack occurred the night after Martin Luther King Jr. Day. However, Stone denied this accusation, calling the date a "sheer coincidence". Stone also denied that the attackers had verbally threatened the DCD protestors, instead describing the incident as, "One member peeked in and sort of said, 'Hi'."

In a later article published by the Dartmouth Alumni Magazine, two Dartmouth alumni said that the DCD had planned to deconstruct the shanties the following week in an act of "guerrilla theater" that would have seen white students (portraying South African soldiers) attack the shanties, which would be occupied by black students (portraying black South Africans).

=== Student occupation of Parkhurst Hall ===
Around noon on January 21, a group of over 200 students gathered on the Green to voice their disapproval of the attacks. That same day, a large banner was hung on one of the destroyed shanties that said, "Racists Did This". The following day, about 200 students performed an occupation of Dartmouth's main administrative building, Parkhurst Hall. The protestors called themselves the Dartmouth Alliance Against Racism and Oppression. Dan Garrick, a spokesman for a group, said that the occupation would continue until administrators met several demands, which included an immediate suspension for the 12 students who had attacked the shanties and for McLaughlin to call an emergency faculty meeting to cancel classes on Friday, January 24. Instead of classes, a forum would be held to discuss diversity on campus. Additionally, Garrick said that the protestors wanted changes in policies to recruit more Hispanic Americans and handicapped students to Dartmouth.

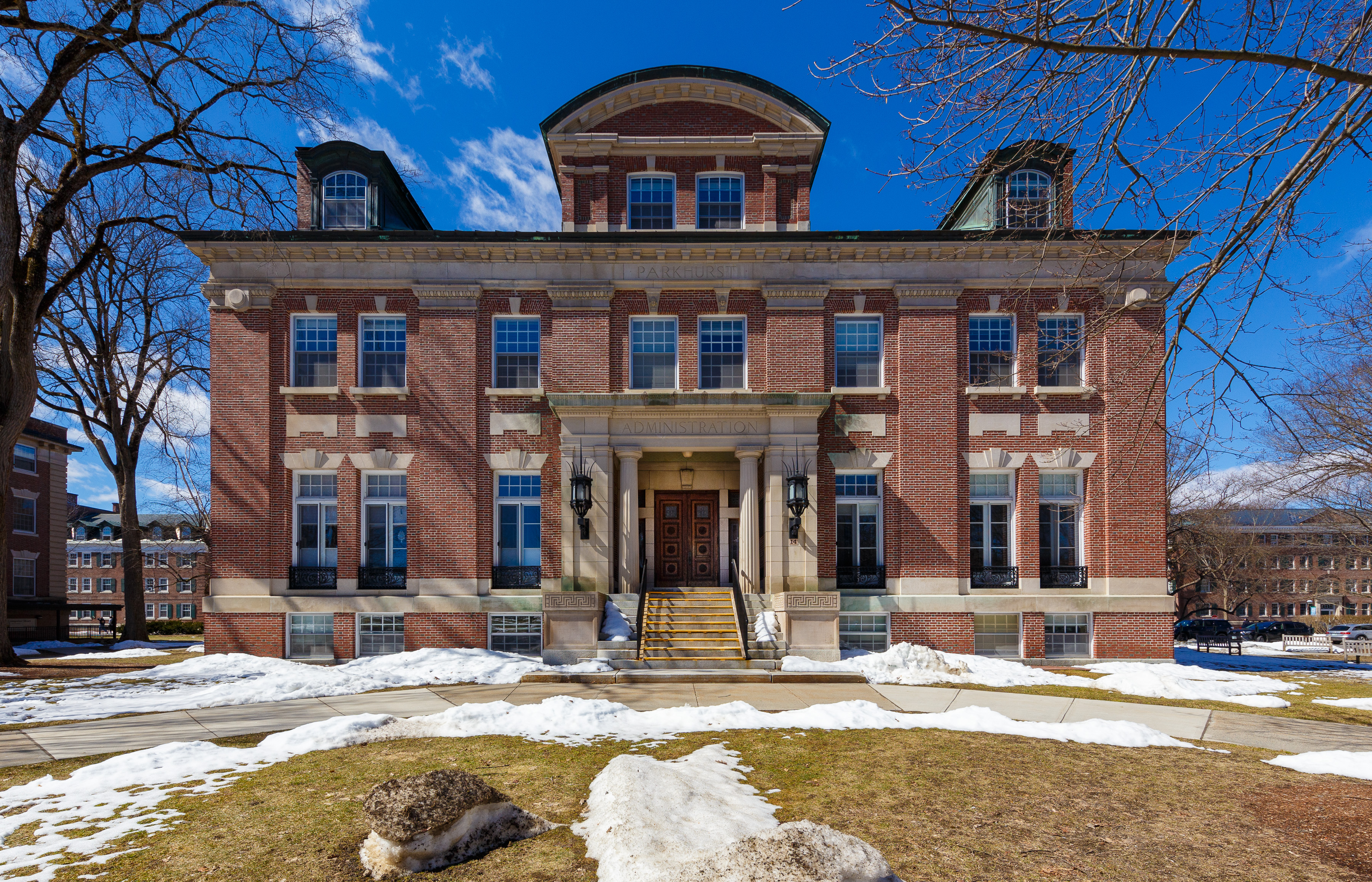
Starting on January 22, a group of about 200 students occupied Parkhurst Hall (pictured 2024) for 30 hours.

Inside the building, protestors gave speeches discussing racism and sang "We Shall Overcome". On the morning of January 23, several dozen students held a two-hour meeting with McLaughlin where they discussed incidents where they had faced discrimination on campus, with several crying while recounting their stories. Following the meeting, the students ended their occupation, which had lasted for 30 hours.

As part of an agreement reached between administrators and the protestors, the university canceled classes on January 24 and instead held a teach-in to discuss "racism, violence and disrespect for diversity and opinion, as most recently demonstrated by the act of demolition of the shanties on the Green". This was the first time that classes had been canceled at Dartmouth in six years, as well as the first time that classes had been replaced by a political teach-in since the 1960s. Roughly 1,000 individuals gathered in Webster Hall to hear speeches, which were also broadcast to other buildings on campus via closed-circuit television. Including attendance in other buildings, it is estimated that about 2,300 people were involved in the forums, including roughly half of the student body. Several more sessions, moderated by faculty members, were conducted the following day. Also on January 24, another shanty, named Martin Luther King Hall, was erected alongside the damaged ones.

=== Removal of the shanty town ===
On February 4, university officials ordered that the shanty town be deconstructed and removed from the Green, saying in a statement that the exhibition had contributed to "a feeling of divisiveness" on the campus. While the shanties remained standing during the Winter Carnival, on February 9, two were demolished, two were relocated to the grounds of nearby Parkhurst Hall, and one was left standing, with plans for its eventual removal. According to the DCD, university officials had agreed to allow the two shanties to stand near Parkhurst Hall until the end of February in observation of Black History Month. The agreement came after a rally on the Green attended by civil rights movement activist Julian Bond that attracted about 250 students and faculty members. The relocations were recorded and aired on CBS Evening News.

On February 10, one of the shanties located near Parkhurst was relocated to the Hood Museum of Art, where, after negotiations with the DCD and the museum, it would be put on display. That same day, the board of selectmen for Hanover notified the university that a building permit would have to be submitted for the remaining shanties or else they would have to be demolished within seven days. The town stated that failure to comply could result in an injunction for the college and a fine of $100 ($294 in 2025) per day. Around the same time, the DCD and the college's Afro-American Society were demanding that one of the shanties be places on a flatbed truck and used as a learning tool for nearby schools in teaching about South Africa.

On February 11, McLaughlin ordered that the two shanties still remaining on the Green be removed. That day, with about 300 onlookers present, a jackhammer was used to remove the base of the structures from the frozen ground while a forklift was used to remove it from the area. During the removal, 18 protestors were arrested and charged with misdemeanors. By the end of the day, the shanties had been completely removed from the Green.

On February 12, the DCD held a vigil on the steps of the main administration building and circulated a petition calling for McLaughlin's resignation that they said they would present to the trustees later that week. On February 15, during an open meeting of the trustees, over a hundred student protestors advocated again for divestment, though the trustees pushed back by saying that they did not feel that full divestment would contribute to an end to apartheid. The trustees also did not consider the petition for McLaughlin's dismissal.

== Legal proceedings ==
On January 24, McLaughlin announced that the university would view the attack not as a coordinated action by the staff of The Dartmouth Review, but instead as the actions of individuals. He further stated that the individuals had violated the university's code of conduct and would face a Committee on Standards the following week. Additionally, the university was considering possible actions to be taken against the protestors who had been involved in the administrative building occupation.

=== Shanty town attackers ===
On February 12, The New York Times reported that the dozen individuals who had attacked the shanties on January 21 had been suspended by a disciplinary committee that was made up of several students, faculty members, and administrators. Eleven of these individuals had been found guilty of all of the charges at hand in the college court, which included "malicious damage to property, unlawful and disorderly conduct, harassment, abuse, coercion and violence", while one was found not guilty of malicious damage to property. The individual found not guilty of malicious damage to property was given a one-term suspension, while seven were suspended for two terms and four were suspended indefinitely, which was the most severe punishment the committee could give. Those suspended indefinitely included Stone, Frank Reichel (the president of The Dartmouth Review), Teresa Polenz (the newspaper's business manager), and Robert Flanigan (a contributing editor for the newspaper). Of those suspended, four officials from The Dartmouth Review who were scheduled to graduate by Spring 1987 were told that they could not apply for readmission until Winter 1987. Defendants were given the option to appeal their decision to McLaughlin, and several lawyers for the defendants said that if the president did not overturn the committee's decision, they would take the matter to court. Charges against two of the individuals were later dropped during an appeal hearing. One was given a letters of reprimand while the other received no penalty.

On March 5, McLaughlin, after consulting "special counsel" and considering "certain procedural aspects" of the initial hearings, said that the dozen students would be given a new hearing. This new hearing was held on March 24. On March 27, the new hearing resulted in 10 of the students being found guilty of disorderly conduct and malicious damage to property, clearing them of the other charges and reducing their suspensions. Per the results of the new hearing, six students were given one-term suspensions, three were given two-term suspension, and one was given a three-term suspension. On March 28, the ten appealed the decision.

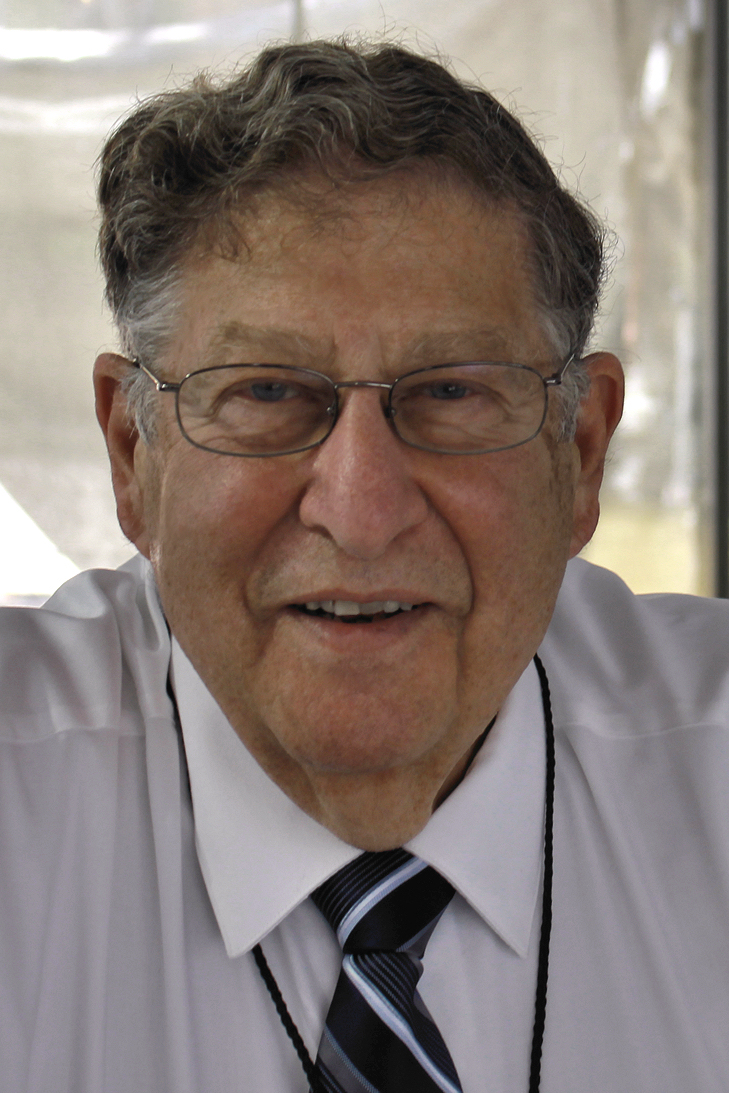
Former New Hampshire Governor John H. Sununu (pictured 2015) was one of several prominent conservatives who criticized the suspensions.

The suspensions drew criticism from several notable conservatives, such as former New Hampshire Governor John H. Sununu and former United States Secretary of the Treasury William E. Simon. On April 10, McLaughlin reduced the punishments for the 10 individuals, lifting the suspensions for six individuals and reducing the sentences for the remaining four to one semester. The move was recommended to McLaughlin by Walter R. Peterson Jr., a former governor of New Hampshire who was at the time serving as the president of Franklin Pierce College. However, the students would still be subject to certain restrictions while on campus, though contemporary reporting does not clarify the specifics of these restrictions. In response, a group of about 20 students occupied the bell tower of Dartmouth's Baker Library to protest McLaughlin's decision. In Late May, Reichel launched a lawsuit against the university seeking to receive his diploma and graduate.

=== Protestors arrested during shanty removal ===
Of the 18 people who were arrested during the college's removal of the shanties from the Green on February 11, 17 were charged with criminal trespass, while one was charged with simple assault. All of the arrested were later released on a personal recognizance bail of $500 ($1,469 in 2025). On February 24, the day before the students were set to be arraigned, the college dropped charges against the 17 individuals who had been charged with criminal trespass and handed the case over to the college's Committee on Standards. However, the individual charged with simple assault was still scheduled for a court hearing on April 1. By the end of March, the committee had found the individuals guilty of violating the university's code of conduct, but decided against punishment for the students.

== Aftermath ==
=== Similar incidents at other institutions ===
The events at Dartmouth were not necessarily unique to that institution, as several others around the same time were experiencing similar events. In early February 1986, anti-apartheid student activists at the University of New Hampshire occupied a university building, and on February 11, there was a similar attack on a shanty town that had been erected at Stanford University. Around the same time, shanties on the campuses of Johns Hopkins University and the University of Utah were set on fire. Other universities in the Northeastern United States saw largescale anti-apartheid protests, including at Brown University and Smith College, while incidents of violence were reported as happening at a shanty town at Yale University. However, according to political activist L.A. Kauffman, the event at Dartmouth was "[t]he most notorious incident" to occur during the divestment movement of the 1980s. By May 1986, several universities had enacted bans on the construction of shanty towns on their campuses.

=== Later events at Dartmouth ===
In an April 1986 letter from McLaughlin to alumni and parents of Dartmouth students, the president expressed regret over the results of the committee regarding the protestors who had been arrested during the shanty town removal, saying, "While I respect the integrity and intentions of this committee, I find the committee's failure to assess meaningful penalties for this type of disruptive conduct to be regrettable. ... In failing to make such persons accountable for their actions, an opportunity has been missed to teach our students to understand and respect the appropriate limits for dissent in our society." The following month, two conservatives ran on a platform to unseat trustees that they had accused of being too lenient on activists during the shanty town protests, though both challengers were ultimately narrowly defeated in an election from alumni. In June, during the university's commencement ceremony, a student protestor and the mother of a student protestor were both arrested by police while trying to disrupt the event. In October, McLaughlin announced that he would be stepping down from his position as president at the end of the academic year.

== Analysis ==
=== Events at Dartmouth ===
Peter Mandel and Doug Greenwood, covering the shanty town story in Dartmouth Alumni Magazine, said, "While initially built to serve as a focus for debate on Dartmouth's South African investment policies, the shanties became catalysts for larger discussions of diversity on campus". According to Hornblower, "the incident ... reignited long-standing complaints about racial insensitivity" at the college. In his coverage of the event, Wald pointed out that, until the 1970s, Dartmouth's student body was almost entirely white and male, and while the demographics had changed, the university still had a "traditional image". Wald quoted James Breeden, a dean at Dartmouth who was also one of the few African Americans who graduated from the university in the 1950s, "This is a confidently male, confidently white institution. People who don't share those characteristics or have some discomfort with them have a difficult path to follow in this place."

The attack on the shanties was condemned by several faculty members and students. Thomas B. Roos, a Dartmouth professor, described the attack as "a vile, destructive act", further saying, "It was brown-shirt bullying on the order of Kristallnacht". The Afro-American Society called the attack racist, with Yves Denize, the society's vice chairman, comparing the event to a cross burning.

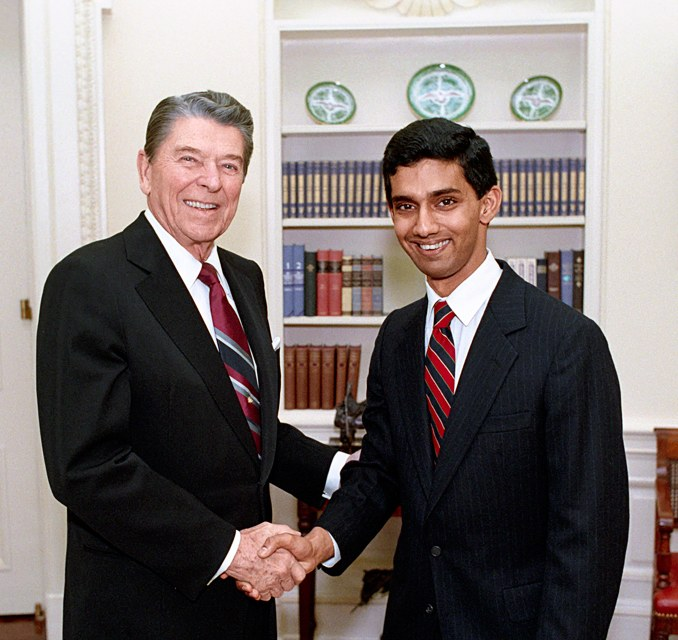
Dinesh D'Souza (right, pictured 1988), a former editor of The Dartmouth Review, called the attack "exuberant but defensible".

Conservative, pro-apartheid commentators were somewhat divided in their response to the attack. Ben Hart, a director at the Heritage Foundation (a conservative think tank) called the act "pretty amusing" and lamented the possibility that anyone involved would face trouble. Similarly, Dinesh D'Souza, a former editor for The Dartmouth Review who was at the time the managing editor for the pro-apartheid Heritage Foundation's Policy Review called the destruction "exuberant but defensible". However, Tod Lindberg, a former editor for the conservative and anti-Black journal Counterpoint at the University of Chicago, criticized the destruction as "an exercise in tastelessness". Sununu, who was also a trustee for Dartmouth at the time, criticized the results of the Committee on Standards, saying that the suspensions of the 10 pro-apartheid attackers, but not the pro-divestment protestors did not represent an "even-handed application" of justice.

=== Divestment movement ===
In her analysis of the anti-apartheid movement of the 1980s, Hall called it "the largest youth mobilization since the antiwar protests of 1968". According to her, by the end of the 1980s, roughly 150 universities had entirely divested from companies doing business in South Africa, with the protests "[resulting] in some of the first ethical investing policies in universities and the corporate world". In July 1986, the University of California university system divested the entirety of the $3.1 billion ($9.1 billion in 2025) that it had invested in South African companies, and the following month, the government of California divested itself of $11 billion ($32 billion in 2025) in investments. Later that year, the federal government of the United States enacted the Comprehensive Anti-Apartheid Act, which, among other things, prohibited government investment in South African companies that were not Black-owned.

== See also ==
- 2024 pro-Palestinian protests on university campuses
