= The Dartmouth Review =

Newspaper at Dartmouth College, New Hampshire, US

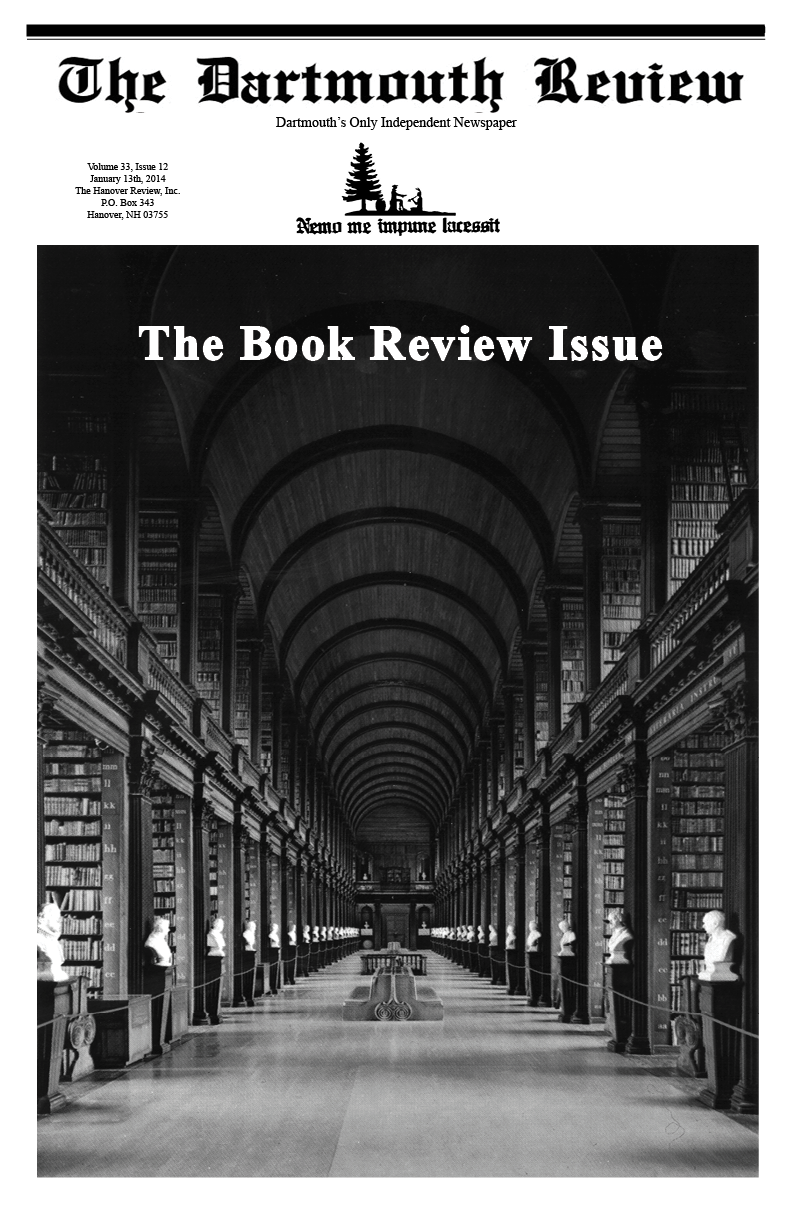
- Cover
- Type: Student newspaper
- Format: Broadsheet
- Owner(s): The Hanover Review, Inc.
- Founder(s): Gregory Fossedal, Gordon Haff, Ben Hart, Keeney Jones
- Founded: 1980
- Political alignment: Conservative
- Headquarters: Hanover, New Hampshire, U.S.
- Circulation: 14,000
- Website: dartreview.com

The Dartmouth Review is a conservative newspaper at Dartmouth College in Hanover, New Hampshire. Founded in 1980 by a number of staffers from the college's daily newspaper, The Dartmouth, the paper is most famous for having spawned other politically conservative U.S. college newspapers that would come to include the Yale Free Press, Carolina Review, The Stanford Review, the Harvard Salient, The California Review, the Princeton Tory, and the Cornell Review.

Past staffers have gone on to occupy positions in the Reagan, Bush, and Trump administrations, write for multiple publications, and author political books. Some of the most notable include Pulitzer Prize-winner Joseph Rago and Hugo Restall of The Wall Street Journal, James Panero of The New Criterion, author Dinesh D'Souza, talk show host Laura Ingraham, and Hoover Institution research fellow Peter Robinson. Author, columnist, and former Nixon and Reagan speechwriter Jeffrey Hart was instrumental in The Review's founding and served as a long-time board member and advisor. As of 2013, the paper has 10,000 off-campus subscribers, distributes a further 2,000 newspapers on campus, and claims 50,000 unique viewers per month on its website.

== History ==
=== Founding and early years ===
The history of The Dartmouth Review can be traced to 1980, when a number of campus conservatives met in Jeffrey Hart's living room to discuss the school's prevailing political culture. Out of these conversations, the idea for a new publication was born. As early Review contributor Dinesh D'Souza tells it, the immediate impetus for the founding was a schism at daily campus newspaper which pitted a group of young Reagan-supporters against the organization's progressive editors. After then editor-in-chief Gregory Fossedal began writing in support of the Republican national platform, other editors set about removing him from his position. In response, Fossedal resolved to start an alternative weekly paper of his own. With the help of Professor Hart and other like-minded conservatives, this is what he ultimately did in May 1980.

When Fossedal left The Daily Dartmouth, he took a number of the paper's younger staffers with him. In the years that followed, this group of writers would form the core of The Dartmouth Review's early leadership and include some of the organization's most famous alumni. Among them were Benjamin Hart, Keeney Jones, Gordon Haff, and Dinesh D'Souza. Peter Robinson, who had graduated the previous spring and was then studying at Oxford University, became an early correspondent and supporter of the paper's efforts.

In June 1980, The Dartmouth Review published its first issue. Distributed to graduating students before the school's annual commencement exercises, it focused on the college's declining academic standards and the controversy surrounding its recent board of trustees elections. In a series of articles that received attention from many Dartmouth alumni, the editors endorsed write-in candidate John Steel and publicized allegations of improprieties amongst the administration-backed Alumni Council.

In the months that followed, the paper began printing on a weekly basis and released a revised statement of purpose from editor Dinesh D'Souza. In his words, The Review's mission was "to become what it was set-up to become: a responsible, bold publication of conservative opinion" and a prodigious source of "unbiased, reliable articles [written] without fear of administrative clamps." Throughout its first few months of activity, the organization and its leaders sought to achieve this greater degree of professionalism by publishing suggested revisions to administrative policy, investigative reports on fraternity controversies, and interviews with notable conservatives like William F. Buckley Jr. It also gained notoriety within some campus circles for its vocal support of Dartmouth's disused Indian mascot and its criticism of affirmative action policies.

=== 1980s ===
In the spring of 1982, The Review published a series of editorials that disparaged the administration's affirmative action policies and lamented their effects on Dartmouth's academic rigor. Among them was an article that used a combination of Ebonics and heavy satire to mock common excuses for the deficient classroom performance of many black students. This episode, when combined with the paper's ongoing support of school's controversial Indian mascot and its criticism of a black professor's Music 2 class, led many on campus to accuse its editors of racism. Some student groups joined with concerned faculty members and administrators to condemn the editorial stances of the publication and denounce "its particular breed of journalism."

During this period, the paper weathered many episodes of controversy and faced down several lawsuits, threats, and instances of vandalism. Despite this hostile reception, however, it continued to build a loyal following among many students and alumni and gained a national reputation for its high-quality writing and energetic style.

In its first decade of activity, The Dartmouth Review published several notable articles and led student opposition to a number of the administration's policies. After the paper launched an editorial campaign that used a survey of national tribal leaders to defend the Indian mascot, support for the defunct symbol became so strong that undergraduates unfurled banners at home football games and proclaimed its return. Earlier that same year, the paper conducted an investigation into the Gay Students' Association (GSA) and its use of college funds. It attempted to reveal improprieties, but the administration did not withdraw its financial support of the GSA or reform its internal controls and standards in response to the paper's investigation.

At this time, the paper also leveraged its burgeoning reputation to conduct interviews with several political and cultural leaders. Among them were Betty Friedan, Ralph Nader, Czeslaw Milosz, Abbie Hoffman, Richard Nixon, Donald Rumsfeld, Bobby Seale, Charlton Heston, Allen Ginsberg, Charlie Daniels, Gennifer Flowers, and Norman Podhoretz. Due in large part to these features and the success of its campus activism, The Review received early endorsements from the likes of Ronald Reagan, Jack Kemp, Bill Bennett, and William F. Buckley Jr. Far from being damaged by the controversies, The Dartmouth Review grew throughout its first decade of publication.

=== 1990s ===
The 1990s began on a controversial note for The Dartmouth Review when an unknown saboteur slipped an anti-Semitic quote from Adolf Hitler into the paper's credo. Although then editor-in-chief Kevin Pritchett immediately recalled the issue and apologized to all who had been offended, the incident fueled further accusations that the paper and its editors were racist. In response to popular demands from students and faculty members alike, President James O. Freedman and the administration organized a "Rally Against Hate" to promote campus unity and censure the actions of The Review. Many alumni and national media outlets were critical of this decision and faulted Freedman for not conducting a fact-finding mission before assuming that the Hitler quote was a deliberate ploy. Despite this blowback, however, the incident severally damaged the reputation of the publication and led to the resignation of several key editors. It would be years before staff recruitment and fundraising fully recovered.

Throughout the rest of President Freedman's tenure, the paper remained a vocal presence within the campus debate and was a consistent critic of the administration's affirmative action, governance, and free speech policies. After President Freedman retired and was replaced by James Wright in 1998, The Review became embroiled in yet another controversy as it spearheaded popular opposition to a proposed fraternity reform plan. In the end, Wright's proposal to force the fraternities to go coed was defeated by overwhelming criticism from students and alumni alike. In the aftermath, many cited The Dartmouth Review and its national readership as the key to the opposition's success.

=== 2000s-present ===
Since 2000, the paper has continued to play an important, albeit more moderate, role in the college's political discourse. Between 2001 and 2005, it became a critical force behind a series of governance fights in which the school's alumni attempted to reassert their influence over the trustee selection process. In what came to be known as the "Lone Pine Revolution," a plurality of alums succeeded in independently nominating and electing four trustees who were critical of the college's stance on issues concerning free speech, athletics, alumni rights, and the curriculum. Among them were Peter Robinson, a member of the Class of 1979 and an early contributor to The Dartmouth Review, and Todd Zywicki, a member of the class of 1988 and a vocal critic of the Freedman administration. The two would later observe that their campaigns were aided immensely by The Dartmouth Review and its favorable coverage of them.

In 2006, the paper sparked campus-wide controversy for its decision to publish an issue with an Indian brandishing a tomahawk on its cover. Inside, the editors included several articles that criticized the college's apologies for a string of incidents that many Native Americans found offensive. After many campus groups expressed their outrage, the paper's leadership apologized for the cover and admitted that it was a mistake.

In the last few years, The Review has focused on the administration's policies concerning the fraternities, governance, free speech, and student life. After President Jim Yong Kim announced an unpopular new meal plan in the spring of 2011, The Review took the lead in criticizing its deficiencies and suggesting more cost-effective alternatives. The paper was also quick to defend Dartmouth against allegations of "institutionalized hazing" brought by Andrew Lohse and The Rolling Stone in the winter of 2012. Since then, it has supported Dartmouth's Greek system against the administration's renewed attempts at reforming it.

In 2013, The Dartmouth Review completed a major internal reorganization under J. P. Harrington and Nicholas Desatnick, then Editors-In-Chief and Stuart A. Allan, then President. The Review built a web and social media presence, increased donations, substantially revised editorial and business practices and moved operations into a large office on Hanover's Main Street. As a result of these reforms, the rejuvenated paper gained national attention for its coverage of campus protests that disrupted the school's prospective student weekend. After representatives from a number of interest groups forced their way into the "Dartmouth Dimensions" show and began protesting racism, elitism, and other social ills, The Review became the first campus publication to cover the event and release full-length stories on its website. In the incident's aftermath, the paper was supportive of campus reform efforts but remained critical of the administration for canceling classes on the following Wednesday and for not punishing the students who were involved. In the months since, the paper has begun publishing commentary on national political events and their reception by various student constituencies on campus. The Dartmouth Review also launched its inaugural Great Issues debate, modeled after Dartmouth College's lauded Great Issues Lecture Series which ran under the college's President John Sloan Dickey until the late 1970s. The inaugural debate was between former reviewer Dinesh D'Souza and Bill Ayers.

As of 2016, the paper has more than 40 writers and business associates on staff and produces sixteen issues a year.

== Format ==
In the years since 1980, the basic layout of The Review has remained largely unchanged. Published in a black-in-white, broadsheet format, each issue is typically 12 to 16 pages in length and includes upwards of 25,000 words in original content. On the first or second page, a letter from the editor-in-chief appears next to the masthead and below a slogan borrowed from the Scottish Highlanders: nemo me impune lacessit (no one threatens me with impunity). The remainder of each issue contains articles written by regular staffers and the occasional guest contributor. It is traditional for the final page to include "Gordon Haff's Last Word," a compilation of quotes related to the issue's central theme, and "Barrett's Mixology, a humorous (and often anonymous) satire written in the form of a cocktail recipe. The Review also makes a habit of publishing letters from its subscribers as well as a number of cartoons and caricatures donated by supportive alumni.

== Editorial stances ==
Founded as an advocate of conservative ideas on Dartmouth's campus, The Review has been a consistent and vocal advocate for a number of social and political positions. In addition to defending the traditions and customs of what many consider to be "the old Dartmouth," the paper has long supported students' rights to free speech, the fraternity system, a Western core curriculum, Dartmouth's undergraduate focus, and more stringent academic standards. It has also criticized affirmative action policies, academic multiculturalism, and administrative restrictions on alumni involvement in issues of college governance.

== Controversies ==
After The Dartmouth Review first gained notoriety for opposing affirmative action policies in the early 1980s, the paper became the focal point of several legal and political battles that garnered a great deal of attention in the national press. Although The Review has become considerably more moderate in recent years, it retains its reputation for having outspoken views and for actively shaping contemporary campus debates. Examples of controversy from the organization's history include:

In March 1982, The Dartmouth Review published an article in which author Keeney Jones criticized affirmative action policies by donning the persona of a disaffected African American student. Entitled "Dis Sho' Ain't No Jive, Bro," it was written entirely in Ebonics and included such excerpts as "white folk be itchin' to be puttin' us back into [fetters]" and "we not be includin' dat Uncle Tom, Tom Sowell, in dis." In response, several campus groups and faculty members voiced concerns about the stereotypical nature of the column and its potential effects on race relations at Dartmouth. The Review's editors defended the piece by pointing out that writers like Mark Twain and Damon Runyon had previously used racial dialects in social satire and that, since many claim jive is a viable alternative to traditional English, the article was the equivalent of publishing a feature in French, Spanish, or Latin.

In May 1982, The Dartmouth Review cofounder Benjamin Hart was delivering copies of the paper's latest issue when he was attacked and bitten by a black administrator from the college's alumni center. The Dartmouth faculty voted to censure the actions of The Review and support the alumni center employee who was convicted of assault and sentenced to three months probation. A number of campus groups, including the Afro-American Society, the Alpha Phi Alpha fraternity, and the Undergraduate Council, similarly condemned the publication and issued statements "deploring [its] particular breed of journalism." Following the attack, Benjamin Hart sought treatment at Mary Hitchcock Hospital and was released after receiving a tetanus shot.

In January 1983, The Dartmouth Review published an article by Laura Ingraham criticizing Professor William Cole's Music 2 course and judging his curriculum to be "one of Dartmouth's most academically deficient." In response, Professor Cole visited Ingraham's campus dorm room and, finding her absent, pounded on the door until a startled roommate calmed him down. The following Tuesday, despite repeated warnings from the Dean of the Faculty, he cancelled his class for two sessions and demanded a public apology from The Dartmouth Review. When the editors stood by the content of the story, he sued them for libel and sought over $2.4 million in remuneration. In the months that followed, the case garnered considerable national attention and pitted much of the Dartmouth faculty against the publication and its supporters. After Professor Cole's representation was unable to demonstrate that there were any factual inaccuracies or generalizations in the piece, he decided to dismiss his libel suit in June 1985.

In May 1984, The Dartmouth Review published an editorial that contained various anecdotes from a Gay Students' Association meeting. The event was advertised as being open to the public; however, the reporter in attendance, Teresa Polenz, brought a tape recorder hidden in a Kenya-style handbag and recorded the meeting without the consent or knowledge of those in attendance. Polenz was subsequently charged with violating New Hampshire privacy statutes 644:9 as well as state wire tapping and eavesdropping ordinances. After a five-month review of the case, Polenz was acquitted of all charges and permitted to re-enroll at the college.

In January 1986, a number of Dartmouth undergraduates formed the committee to Beautify the Green and used sledgehammers to dismantle the shanties that had been erected in the center of the campus as part of a campaign to promote institutional divestment of South African assets. The timing of the "attack", as The New York Times and other media referred to it, was 3:00 am, and two Dartmouth students were sleeping inside one of the shanties when the sledgehammer attack began and were "awakened by the sound of hammers and glass shattering."

Prior to the event, the shanties had been deemed illegal by the Hanover Police Department and the college had requested that the protesters vacate the Green prior to the traditional festivities of the Dartmouth Winter Carnival. Despite these efforts, the protestors remained in their wooden structures and refused to stage their demonstration elsewhere. When negotiations with College administrators reached an impasse, a band of twelve undergraduates took matters into their own hands and drove a flat-bed onto the Green, dismantled three of the four shanties, and sent the lumber off to a local charity. Former Editor-in-Chief of The Dartmouth Review and "Committee to Beautify the Green" spokeswoman Debbie Stone was reported as acknowledging that the committee was "partly a project of the Dartmouth Review."

The news of the shanties' demise provoked campus-wide uproar and received immediate censure from President McLaughlin. Ten out of the twelve individuals involved were affiliated with The Review, leading to the paper being blamed for the incident. Charges of racism were levied against its editors because the demolition had occurred the evening after Martin Luther King Jr.'s birthday. Student activists barricaded themselves in the President's office with demands that the Dean of the college issue a public repudiation of the paper and host teach-ins about racial tolerance. In response, the administration canceled classes on the following Friday and filed disciplinary charges against the twelve perpetrators. After an internal judicial review found them all guilty of violating the school's Code of Conduct and selectively suspended the ten who wrote for The Dartmouth Review, concerns about the apparent bias of the proceedings and witness tampering led to national outrage and calls for a retrial. With help from New Hampshire Senator Gordon Humphrey and Governor John Sununu, the ten students successfully appealed the findings of the panel and were able to remain enrolled at the college.

In February 1988, The Dartmouth Review published an editorial in which its editors criticized several courses for their lack of academic rigor. Among them was Dr. William Cole's Music 2 class. Prior to the completion of the piece, then Editor-in-Chief Christopher Baldwin informed Professor Cole of the paper's intent to publish anecdotes from his course and that, should he desire it, The Review would give him a space to respond. After Baldwin was rebuffed, he and three other staffers went to speak with Professor Cole personally. When Cole saw them, however, he became enraged and began berating and physically threatening Review editor John Sutter. In the confrontation that followed, Cole repeatedly poked at Sutter's eyes, grabbed the paper's photographer, and ripped the flashbulb off of his camera. When prompted for an apology, Cole beckoned at Sutter and told him to "come and take it from me." On February 26, Dartmouth's Committee on Standards charged the four students involved with "harassment, violating the right to privacy, and disorderly conduct." An attempt by The Review's editors to file similar charges against Cole and the African American students who subsequently threatened them was blocked by Dean of the college, Edward Shanahan. In the judicial proceedings that followed, the committee voted to separate Baldwin and Sutter from Dartmouth for six terms, suspend photography editor, John Quilhot, for two, and place Review contributor Sean Nolan on disciplinary probation for four. Because of perceived procedural errors and the admitted bias of several members of the panel, all four staffers sought to appeal their punishments, but their requests were denied by the administration. In response, both Baldwin and Sutter sought a legal injunction before a full-scale jury trial to readmit them at the start of the following term. In what became a closely followed case that drew national media attention from outlets such as The National Review, The Wall Street Journal, and The New Republic, Judge Bruce Mohl of the New Hampshire Superior Court ruled in favor of The Review staffers and ordered the administration to "forthwith reinstate the plaintiffs… as full time students at Dartmouth College." He also noted that although the college's own judicial proceedings were rife with procedural flaws, he found "no persuasive evidence that Dartmouth [had] retaliated against or otherwise pursued disciplinary action against the plaintiffs on account of their association with The Dartmouth Review.". When Professor Cole resigned from faculty in the fall of 1990, he would cite this incident and his checkered history with the paper as one of the reasons for his departure.

In October 1988, The Dartmouth Review published a column by James Garrett that compared the administration of College President James Freedman to that of the Third Reich. Entitled "Ein Reich, Ein Volk, Ein Freedman," the piece suggested that Dartmouth's first Jewish president had used his charisma to seek "'a Final Solution' to the Conservative Problem" and was actively persecuting Review staffers for their political beliefs. Many student groups, faculty members, and alumni criticized the editors' decision to publish the article and accused the publication of anti-Semitism. The staff, a quarter of whom were Jewish at the time, defended the column as an instance of "shock journalism" and issued an apology to those they had offended.

In the fall of 1990, an issue of The Dartmouth Review appeared not with the usual quote from Theodore Roosevelt in the masthead but with several lines of text from Hitler's Mein Kampf. When the discovery was made, then Editor-in-Chief Kevin Pritchett recalled every issue that had not already been distributed, publicly apologized for what had occurred, and pledged to conduct "a thorough investigation into the source of the sabotage." Rather than work with the paper as the editors had requested, however, President Freedman and the rest of the administration publicly censured The Review and organized a "Rally Against Hate" to promote racial solidarity and condemn what was assumed to be a deliberate act of anti-Semitism. News of the campus controversy quickly attracted attention from national news outlets, including The New York Times, The Wall Street Journal, and The National Review. In response to assertions that the paper was racist, Pritchett commissioned two independent reports, one from the New Hampshire Human Rights Commission and the other from the Anti-Defamation League of B'Nai B'irth, to investigate The Review's treatment of Jewish religious and social matters since its inception. Neither organization "[found] any hint of bigotry or prejudice" and concluded that the Hitler quote was most likely inserted as a deliberate act of sabotage. The paper also worked with the Hanover Police Department to identify the culprit and conduct an internal investigation. Although the inquiry named several suspects, no one has ever officially established who inserted the Hitler quote into the masthead.

The November 28, 2006, issue of The Dartmouth Review featured an image of an Indian brandishing a scalp with the headline: "The Natives are Getting Restless!" The paper contained multiple pieces criticizing both Native American students' complaints about a string of incidents perceived as racist as well as the college's apologies for them. In an interview with the Associated Press, the Dartmouth Review editor-in-chief described the issue as a response to "the overdramatic reaction to events this term." Editors subsequently issued statements expressing their regret and called the cover a mistake.

In fall of 2012, The Dartmouth Review ran a cover with a picture of Dean of the College Charlotte Johnson and the Director of the Greek Letter Organizations and Societies office, Wes Schaub, posed in the style of American Gothic. The issue criticized the college's new alcohol and walkthrough policies as unsafe and invasive, predicting they would force the college's fraternities to shut their doors to freshmen in an effort to reduce liability. Later that year, the college's Inter-Fraternity Council moved to impose such a measure for the following school year.

Blake Neff, a member of the class of 2013 who had written for The Dartmouth Review, served as the head writer for Tucker Carlson Tonight until it emerged that he had made anonymous posts on the message board AutoAdmit that featured racist, sexist, and homophobic content. He resigned from Fox News in July 2020.

Throughout its history, The Dartmouth Review has met opposition for its controversial use of the college's name. Many critics of the paper have claimed that because it does not have any institutional affiliation with Dartmouth and because its social stances are perceived to be inimical to the values of the school, the paper should be forced to change its name. For its part, The Review has resisted such charges by reminding opponents that many of Hanover's independent shops and businesses have adopted the college's name. As a result, requiring a political organization to strike "Dartmouth" from its title would be seen as a selective infringement on free speech and would set a dangerous precedent for future abuse.

== Influence and legacy ==
Critics have charged that the paper is more provocative than effective, though the staff asserts that the combination of its investigative journalism and its consistent advocacy of issues relating to the curriculum, governance, and free speech have led to changes at the college. Some have credited its writings for the resilience of the fraternity system, reforms to club and activity funding, and greater alumni involvement in internal policy formation. The fact that early contributors like Peter Robinson could later be elected to Dartmouth's Board of Trustees testifies to the paper's ability to influence public opinion and have a lasting effect on mainstream campus debates.

Since 1980, dozens of similar publications, including The Yale Free Press, The Stanford Review, The Harvard Salient, The California Review, The Princeton Tory, and The Cornell Review, have been founded at peer institutions and credited The Dartmouth Review as a guiding influence.

Outside of the academy, the paper has also had an important impact on the conservative movement as a whole. As Peter Robinson relates:

At the Reagan White House, I wrote speeches for the President, Will Cattan '83 wrote speeches for the Vice President, and Dinesh D'Souza '83 helped administer the Office of Domestic Policy. Within a few blocks, Gregory Fossedal '81 held a senior position at the Department of Education, Benjamin Hart '81 produced position papers for The Heritage Foundation, Michael [Keeney] Jones '82 wrote speeches for the U.S. Secretary of the Treasury, and Laura Ingraham '85 served as an assistant to the Secretary of Transportation. So many Dartmouth students went from The Review straight to positions of responsibility in the nation's capital that Sidney Blumenthal, a reporter for the Washington Post, composed an article about us in which he hinted darkly at some sort of conspiracy.

== Notable alumni ==
The Dartmouth Review has produced alumni who have gone on to distinguish themselves in the fields of journalism, politics, and law. Dartmouth Review alumni include:

- Harmeet Dhillon - A former editor-in-chief of The Dartmouth Review and a member of the class of 1989, Dhillon clerked for U.S. Court of Appeals Judge Paul V. Niemeyer. She was later an ACLU board member, a San Francisco lawyer, and a Republican party official. A National Committeewoman of the RNC for California, she ran for RNC chair in 2023. During the coronavirus pandemic, she filed lawsuits against California for its implementation of stay-at-home order to halt the spread of the coronavirus.
- Dinesh D'Souza – A former editor-in-chief of The Dartmouth Review, member of the class of 1983, and former fellow at the Hoover Institution at Stanford University, D'Souza is a media personality and commentator. The author of Obama's America and a frequent contributor to conservative talk shows, his 1991 book Illiberal Education spent 15 weeks on The New York Times bestseller list.
- Gregory Fossedal – A co-founder and former editor-in-chief of The Dartmouth Review and a member of the class of 1981, Fossedal is a senior fellow at the Alexis de Tocqueville Institution and the author of Direct Democracy in Switzerland.
- Laura Ingraham – A former editor-in-chief of The Dartmouth Review and a member of the class of 1985, Ingraham served as a law clerk to Supreme Court Justice Clarence Thomas and later wrote several books. She was the host of the nationally syndicated The Laura Ingraham Show and currently hosts The Ingraham Angle on Fox News.
- James Panero – A former editor-in-chief of The Dartmouth Review and a member of the class of 1998, Panero is now the executive editor of The New Criterion.
- Joseph Rago – A former editor-in-chief of The Dartmouth Review and a member of the class of 2005, Rago was a member of The Wall Street Journal's editorial board until his death in 2017. He received a Pulitzer Prize for Editorial Writing in 2011.
- Peter Robinson – A former correspondent for The Dartmouth Review and a member of the class of 1979, Robinson was the chief White House speechwriter for Ronald Reagan. He is now a fellow at the Hoover Institution, for which he hosts the current affairs show Uncommon Knowledge. In 2005, he was elected by petition vote to the Dartmouth Board of Trustees.

== See also ==
- Collegiate Network
