= The Princeton Tory =

Conservative publication by Princeton University students

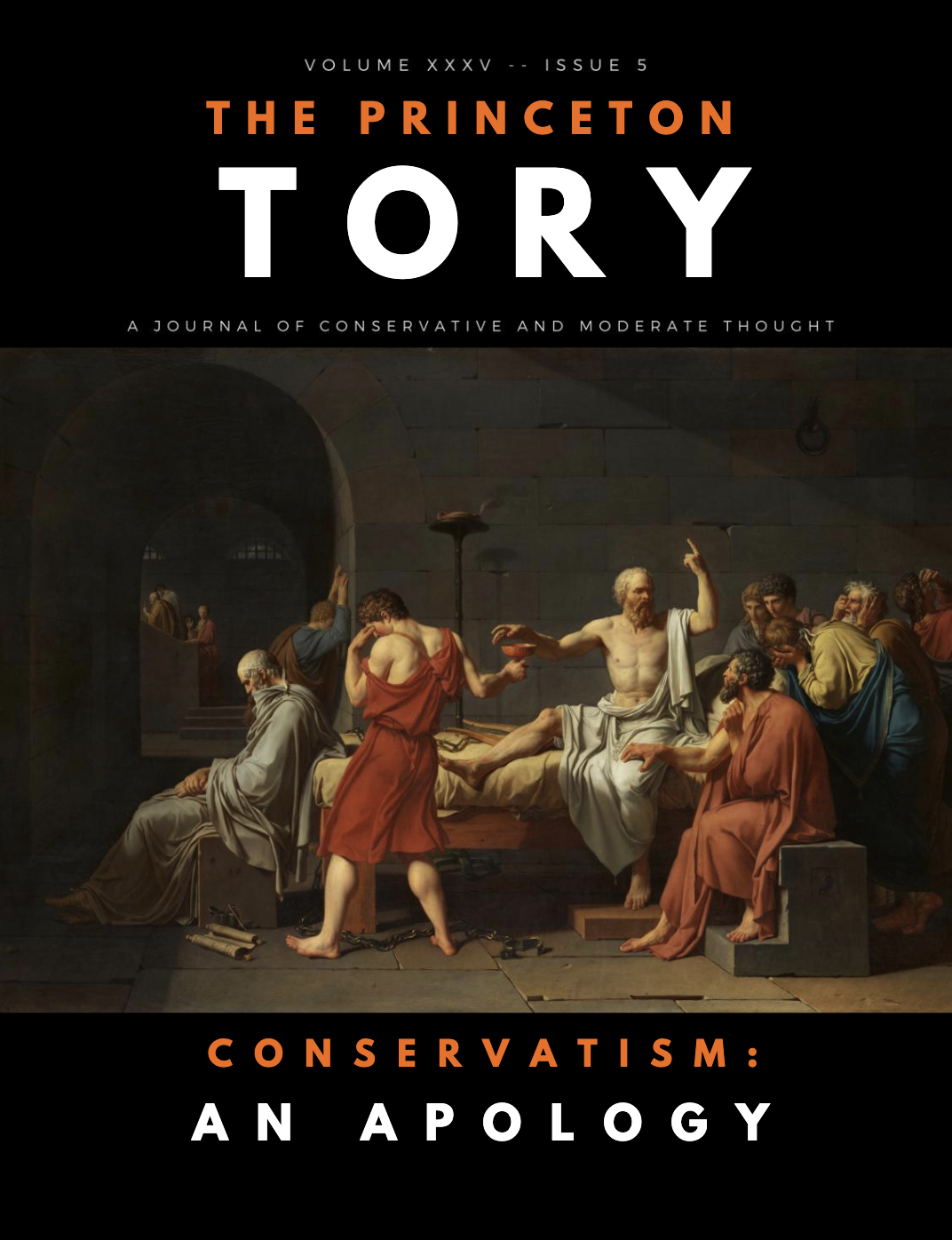
- Categories: Center-right, political thought
- Founder: Yoram Hazony
- Founded: 5 October 1984
- Country: United States
- Based in: Princeton University
- Website: theprincetontory.com
- OCLC: 15710131

The Princeton Tory is a magazine of conservative political thought written and published by Princeton University students. Founded in 1984 by Yoram Hazony, the magazine has played a role in various controversies, including a national debate about white privilege. Notable alumni associated with the magazine include United States Senator Ted Cruz, and the current United States Secretary of Defense, Pete Hegseth. Four editors have gone on to be Rhodes Scholars.

== History ==
=== Founding ===
In the early 1980s, there were several failed efforts to create a magazine with a conservative viewpoint at Princeton University, including the Madison Report, which had a circulation of 2,500 but folded due to financial difficulties. In October 1984, a group of students including Yoram Hazony and Amy Bix, began publishing the Princeton Tory, planning for six issues in the initial year. They sought to publish a "thinking journal" and provide a forum for moderate and conservative viewpoints on a campus that was in their view dominated by left-wing politics. Hazony attributed the failure of the previous attempts at conservative publications to their tendency for sensationalism and mud-slinging. In contrast, the Tory was founded to highlight cogent argumentation with early issues addressing topics such as religion in politics, the composition of the Supreme Court, and the university's endorsement of a nuclear freeze.

=== "Pen over the sledgehammer" ===
In 1986, the Tory found itself in disagreement with future noted conservative Dinesh D'Souza. At Dartmouth College, student staff members of the conservative Dartmouth Review had taken sledgehammers to a shanty town set up by protesters calling for divestment from South Africa over its Apartheid policies. D'Souza, a Dartmouth alumnus, in arguing that Princeton would not see similar political violence, was quoted in the Daily Princetonian as saying, "At Dartmouth there is a healthy activism on both the left and the right. At Princeton, politics masquerades as fashion. There are more conservatives who are more confident in their actions at Dartmouth. At Princeton, you only have the Tory, which is too cerebral to be considered." This critique promoted a response from Tory publisher Dan Polisar: "D'Souza criticized the Tory for being 'too cerebral.' If that means that we do not favor using sledgehammers as a tool for political debate, then we do not object. We would rather demonstrate that the problems symbolized by shanties are exacerbated by divestment, as we did in our October issue, than to stage an attack on the symbols themselves... Campus conservatives are proud of this restraint, and should receive credit, not blame, for choosing the pen over the sledgehammer."

== Controversies ==
=== Tal Fortgang and "White Privilege" ===
In April 2014, Princeton freshman Tal Fortgang penned an essay in the Tory entitled, "Checking My Privilege: Character as the Basis of Privilege." Fortgang wrote the essay in response to being told by a classmate, after expressing his views on welfare spending and the national debt, to "check his privilege." He stated, "The phrase, handed down by my moral superiors, descends recklessly, like an Obama-sanctioned drone, and aims laserlike at my pinkish-peach complexion, my maleness, and the nerve I displayed in offering an opinion rooted in a personal Weltanschauung." The essay was picked up by Time magazine, led to an appearance on Fox News and caused a firestorm of criticism from the left and support from the right.

Fortgang made use of his own family's history, with a grandfather exiled to Siberia, a grandmother sent to the Bergen-Belsen concentration camp, and a great-grandmother and five great-aunts and uncles who were shot in an open grave outside their hometown. His grandfather and father built a wicker basket business and emphasized education. Fortgang wrote, "While I haven't done everything for myself up to this point in my life, someone has sacrificed themselves so that I can lead a better life, but that is a legacy I am proud of. I have checked my privilege. And I apologize for nothing."

== Notable alumni ==
- Lawrence Otis Graham, Class of 1985. Author, "Member of the Club", ISBN 0060184124
- Yoram Hazony, Class of 1986. Founder of the Shalem Center.
- Ted Cruz, Class of 1992. United States Senator from Texas, presidential candidate.
- Danielle Allen, Class of 1993. Harvard political scientist, Marshall scholar.
- Pete Hegseth, Class of 2003. Secretary of Defense, United States Senate candidate, Executive Director of Vets for Freedom, CEO of Concerned Veterans for America.
- Adam Hoffman, Class of 2023. Member of DOGE, Senior National Security official within the Second Trump Administration

== See also ==
- Collegiate Network
- Dartmouth Review
- Cornell Review
- Harvard Salient
- Stanford Review
