= Amy Bix =

American historian of technology

Amy Sue Bix
- Known for: history of technology, history of medicine, women and gender studies

Academic background
- Education: Ph.D., History of Science, Johns Hopkins University (1994) Bachelor of Arts, Biology, Princeton University (1987)

Amy Sue Bix is an American historian of science, technology and medicine whose research topics include studies of women and gender, the history of education, and twentieth-century social, cultural, and intellectual history. She is a distinguished professor of history at Iowa State University.

== Education and career ==
Bix grew up in the Chicago area. She earned a bachelor's degree in biology from Princeton University in 1987, with Sigma Xi honors. At Princeton, she was one of the founders of The Princeton Tory, a conservative student magazine.

In 1994, she earned a Ph.D. in the history of science from Johns Hopkins University. Her dissertation, Inventing Ourselves Out of Jobs?: America's Debate over Technological Unemployment, 1929-1981, was selected as one of the American Library Association's Choice Magazine Outstanding Academic Titles.

Bix has been a history professor at Iowa State University since 1993. In 2007 she became the director of Iowa State's Consortium for the History of Technology and Science. In May 2023 she was awarded the title of Distinguished Professor.

== Books ==
Bix's books include:

- Girls Coming to Tech!: A History of American Engineering Education for Women (MIT Press, 2013)
- The Future is Now: Science and Technology Policy in America Since 1950 (with Alan I. Marcus, Humanity Books, 2007)
- Inventing Ourselves Out of Jobs?: America's Debate over Technological Unemployment, 1929-1981 (Johns Hopkins University Press, 2000)

== Honors and awards ==
Bix is the recipient of:

- The 2022 Bernard S. Finn IEEE History Prize of the Society for the History of Technology (SHOT)
- The 2021 Martha Trescott Prize of SHOT
- The 2015 Award for Distinguished Literary Contributions Furthering Public Understanding and the Advancement of the Engineering Profession of the IEEE
- The 2015 Margaret W. Rossiter History of Women in Science Prize of the History of Science Society for her 2013 book Girls Coming to Tech!: A History of American Engineering Education for Women
- The 2014 Betty Vetter Award for Research of the Women in Engineering ProActive Network (WEPAN)
