= California Patriot =

US magazine (2000-)

The California Patriot was an independent, student-run, glossy-covered opinion magazine at the University of California, Berkeley.

== History ==
The magazine was started in 2000 by two 19-year-old sophomores, Tyler Monroe and Kelso Barnett.

== Overview ==
The magazine's mission was to promote conservative politics and opinion at the university. The magazine printed eight issues a year and was distributed on the Berkeley campus free of charge. When a new issue was released, the Patriot homepage provided a link to a pdf version for reading. The Patriot also provided subscription options. The magazine received most of its funding from individuals and conservative foundations around the country.

== Notable stories ==
In 2002, the California Patriot broke a story that the University of California, Berkeley, planned to host a 9/11 memorial event without any red-white-and-blue ribbons or other displays of American patriotism because they might offend foreign students. Bill O'Reilly hosted the editor of the California Patriot to tell the story on Fox News. The publicity caused the administration to reverse that decision.

During the early 2000s, the magazine promoted support for President Bush and the Iraq War. Other stories have involved alleged misappropriation of money by an organ of the student government, and the use by the university of student funds to campaign against a California ballot proposition.

== See also ==
- Collegiate Network
