= The Cornell Review =

Cornell University student newspaper

- Type: Student published fortnightly
- Format: Tabloid in newsprint
- Owner(s): Ithaca Review, Inc.
- Editor: Eben Hill
- Founded: 1984
- Political alignment: Conservative, Libertarian
- Headquarters: Ithaca, New York, U.S.
- Circulation: 2,000
- Website: thecornellreview.org

The Cornell Review is an independent newspaper published by students of Cornell University in Ithaca, New York. With the motto, "We Do Not Apologize," the Review has a history in conservative journalism and was once one of the leading college conservative publications in the United States. While the ideological makeup of its staff shifts over the years, the paper has consistently accused Cornell of adhering to left-wing politics and political correctness, delivered with a signature anti-establishment tone.

== History ==
=== Founding ===
The Cornell Review was founded on Cornell's Ithaca campus in 1984. Jim Keller, a government major, founded The Cornell Review during his senior year in the spring of 1984. The paper drew immediate and critical attention for its discordant rhetoric and "shock journalism". Ann Coulter, then an undergraduate in the history department of the College of Arts and Sciences, served as its editor during the fall of 1984.

Much of the paper's structure in the early years was influenced by the unanticipated success of the Dartmouth Review at Dartmouth College, which inspired conservative students at other institutions to found similar newspapers. The Institute for Educational Affairs, founded in 1978 to assist conservative academics, created The Collegiate Network in 1984 to offer these groups technical and financial assistance.

During the 1980s the Review targeted affirmative action, gay rights, communist sympathizers, abortion, and anti-apartheid activists, while defending the Reagan Administration, the Greek system, and the university administration (against striking workers). It notably criticized university-sponsored ethnicity-oriented residential communities, known as "program houses", as segregationist.

In 1986, some students voiced their opposition to the paper by seeking out and shredding nearly every copy of one issue at a multitude of locations on campus during the early morning hours after delivery.

=== Merger with Cornell American ===
In 1992, before the Review had backed down from its more controversial positions, a deliberately unsensational rival publication began printing called The Cornell American. It became the demesne of social conservatives until it ceased publishing in 1996.

In 2003 and 2004, successive editors began a controversial revamp of the Review, swinging it toward a more libertarian conservatism and a more neutral editorial position. In response, former Review writer and activist Ryan Horn resurrected a new Cornell American to take up the social conservatism from which the Review had distanced itself. The Cornell Review and the Cornell American had switched roles: the Review had become the calmer and lower profile paper, and the American the more traditional.

Rivalry between the Review and the American began to die down during the ensuing years as the staffs of the respective papers changed and the editorial positions of both papers began to converge. In April 2007, students from the Review and the American agreed to merge the two papers in the interest of preserving a conservative voice on campus. The Review assumed the American's slogan: "Limited Government, Traditional Values, America First." It then reverted to the original Review slogan, "The Conservative Voice on Campus," until it changed to "We Do Not Apologize" in late 2014. The change was made due to the growing libertarian nature of the newspaper's staff and editorial stance.

== Cornell Insider ==
In December 2008, The Cornell Review started its blog, Cornell Insider. It is primarily focused on breaking campus events.

The Insider has been linked by blogs of all sizes, including IvyGate. Legal Insurrection, Campus Reform,

The website also broke stories that were followed by media outlets, including The Hill, RealClearPolitics and The O'Reilly Factor.

== Management and operations ==
The Review was incorporated in 1986 as The Ithaca Review, Inc. The editorial staff is headed by an undergraduate editor-in-chief, while the business staff is headed by an undergraduate president.

Funding for the Review comes primarily from the Collegiate Network, a syndicate of conservative campus newspapers funded by the Intercollegiate Studies Institute.

=== Notable alumni ===
- Ann Coulter, conservative social and political commentator
- Kenneth K. Lee, United States Circuit Judge
- Jamie Weinstein, host of The Dispatch Podcast, former senior editor of The Daily Caller,

== See also ==
- Collegiate Network
- Cornell University
- The Cornell Daily Sun
