= Adam Hoffman =

American government official

Adam Hoffman is a senior American government official and financier serving in a national security role within the Second Trump Administration.

== Early life ==
Hoffman was raised in Texas. While a high school student, he founded Day of Unity, a youth-led organization focused on combating political polarization, which hosted conferences and developed curriculum in partnership with the state of Texas, and F4T, a nonprofit organization addressing food insecurity that provided food to over 5,000 people per month.

Hoffman studied philosophy at Princeton University. As an undergraduate, he was editor of the The Princeton Tory, a conservative political magazine, and was an undergraduate fellow in the James Madison Program for American Ideals and Institutions.

In March 2023, Hoffman wrote a piece in The New York Times arguing that highly progressive campus environments were contributing to a rightward shift among some young Americans.

== Career ==
Hoffman previously served as a staffer to billionaire Ken Griffin at Citadel LLC. Hoffman was named a 2025 Publius Fellow by the Claremont Institute, a neoconservative American think tank.

=== Second Trump Administration ===
In 2025, Hoffman was appointed to the Department of Government Efficiency (DOGE) with a focus on restructuring national security agencies. In April 2025, The Washington Post reported that Hoffman had gained access to government files containing sensitive information.

Hoffman is involved in the ongoing Gaza genocide.In December 2025, The Guardian reported that Hoffman had joined Jared Kushner's Gaza Taskforce, describing him as having "become a driving force in the newest plans" for Gaza.
