= James Panero =

American cultural critic and the executive editor of The New Criterion

- Born: December 15, 1975 (age 50); New York City, New York, U.S.
- Education: Dartmouth College (BA)
- Occupation: Art critic
- Spouse: Dara Mandle

James S. Panero (born December 15, 1975) is an American cultural critic and the executive editor of The New Criterion, a conservative culture journal.

== Early life ==
Panero was born in New York City, and grew up on the Upper West Side of Manhattan. He attended the preparatory school Trinity in Manhattan. Panero graduated from Dartmouth in 1998, where he majored in classics. In his sophomore year he was appointed editor-in-chief of The Dartmouth Review.

== Career ==
Panero joined the editorial staff of National Review upon graduation. In 1999 he worked in Gstaad, Switzerland as a writing assistant to William F. Buckley Jr on his novel Spytime: The Undoing of James Jesus Angleton (Harcourt, 2000).

Before joining The New Criterion in 2001, Panero was a graduate student in the History of Art and Architecture department at Brown University, where he was awarded the University Scholarship. His area of focus was late-nineteenth-century French modernism.

Panero became the monthly gallery critic of The New Criterion in 2003.

Panero has written for New York Magazine, The New York Times Book Review, The Wall Street Journal, City Journal, Philanthropy Magazine, Forbes, the International Herald Tribune, Humanities Magazine, National Review, The Weekly Standard, The Claremont Review, The University Bookman, and The Dartmouth Alumni Magazine. In 2007, he became a regular writer for Art & Antiques Magazine.

In 2013, he was a William and Barbara Edwards Media Fellow at the Hoover Institution of Stanford University.

Panero is the co-editor of The Dartmouth Review Pleads Innocent, an anthology of the newspaper published by the Intercollegiate Studies Institute in Spring 2006.

He is a contributor to Counterpoints: 25 Years of The New Criterion on Culture and the Arts (Ivan R. Dee, 2007), The State of Art Criticism, edited by James Elkins and Michael Newman (Routledge, 2008), and "Future Tense: The Lessons of Culture in an Age of Upheaval" (Encounter Books, 2012).

He is married to the writer and teacher Dara Mandle.

In June 2019, he appeared on Tucker Carlson's Fox News to argue against the metric system.

== Exhibitions ==
- "The Joe Bonham Project: An Exhibition Curated by James Panero": wartime illustrators document the rehabilitation of wounded warriors. On view at Storefront gallery, Bushwick, Brooklyn, September 1 through September 18, 2011.

== Works ==
- Future Tense: The Lessons of Culture in an Age of Upheaval (Roger Kimball, editor, James Panero, contributing writer on "What's a Museum?") ISBN 978-1594036347
- "The State of Art Criticism (The Art Seminar)" (James Elkins, editor; James Panero, contributing writer) ISBN 978-0415977876
- "Re-Enchantment (The Art Seminar)" (James Elkins and David Morgan, editors; James Panero, contributing writer) ISBN 978-0415977876
- The Dartmouth Review Pleads Innocent (James Panero and Stefan Beck, editors) ISBN 978-1-932236-93-4
