= Albany Public Library =

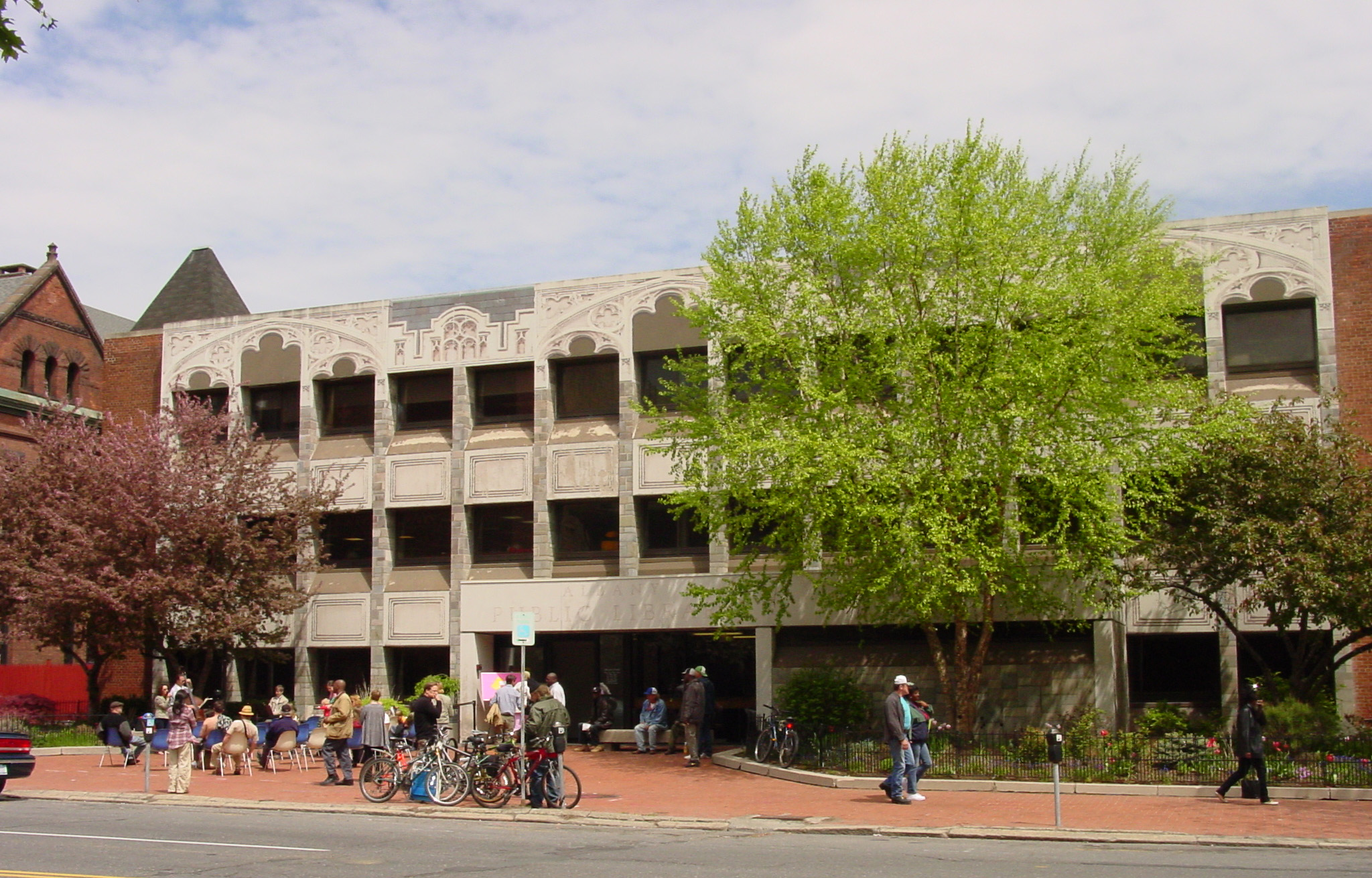
- Albany Public Library's Washington Avenue Branch
- 42°39′23.1″N 73°45′44.3″W
- Location: 161 Washington Avenue, Albany, New York, 12210, New York, United States
- Established: 1844
- Branches: 7

Collection
- Size: 250,000

Access and use
- Population served: 97,904 (Albany, New York)

Other information
- Budget: $6,434,764
- Director: Andrea Nicolay
- Employees: 125
- Website: http://www.albanypubliclibrary.org

Albany Public Library (APL) is a public library system serving the city of Albany, New York. APL also operates as the Central Library for the Upper Hudson Library System, a resource sharing consortium which unites public library services across twenty-nine member libraries in Albany County and Rensselaer County. Governed by a publicly elected board of trustees, APL is a school district public library with a budget largely funded by a tax levy presented annually to registered voters in the City School District of Albany. The library has seven branches located in various neighborhoods of Albany, New York. The branches are circulating libraries that are open to the general public. The library was developed in the 19th century, founded from society libraries and the wealth of private citizens, and currently holds a collection of 250,000 items.

== History ==
In January, 1834, the Young Men’s Association for Mutual Improvement (YMA) opened a reading room with 800 volumes and 100 newspapers and periodicals. The Albany Public Library grew out of this reading room, which remained a subscription library with a $2.00 per annum fee until 1899. The first free library in the city of Albany, NY, the Albany Free Library, was established in 1893 by local educator John A. Howe. In 1900, the Albany Free Library opened the Pine Hills Branch at 272 Ontario Street. In 1901, the Pruyn Library opened at 135 North Pearl under the trusteeship of the YMA. In 1922, the YMA, Pruyn Library, and Albany Free Library merged to become the Albany Public Library with Elizabeth Smith as its first director. In 1923, Albany Public Library and the City of Albany reached a formal agreement to provide services, and the Delaware Branch was established.

In 1924, the Harmanus Bleecker Library was constructed at 19 Dove Street and became the new headquarters of Albany Public Library. In 1929, the John A. Howe Branch was constructed at Schuyler and Broad Streets. In 1944, the New Scotland Branch opened in Public School 19. In 1960, the Upper Hudson Library Federation was founded and chartered by the Board of Regents of the University of the State of New York to improve library service in Albany and Rensselaer Counties, and APL was designated its Central Library. In 1968, the Pruyn Library closed, and in 1970, it was razed as part of the I-787 arterial ramp construction plan.

In 1977, APL moved its headquarters from 19 Dove Street to 161 Washington Avenue, which was constructed and operated by the IRS in 1955. In 2002, APL was re-chartered from an association library to a school district library. In 2005, the North Albany Branch opened off the lobby of the North Albany YMCA. In 2023, the Legal Insurrection Foundation challenged a hiring practice at the library.

== Branch Improvement Plan ==
As of June, 2010, APL completed a $29.1 million Branch Improvement Plan—the first comprehensive infrastructure project in its history. The plan involved renovating three existing branches—Pine Hills, Delaware, and Howe—along with constructing two new branches—John J. Bach and Arbor Hill/West Hill. All five of these branches are energy efficient silver Leadership in Energy and Environmental Design certified buildings.

== Current branches ==
=== Arbor Hill/West Hill Branch ===
Newly constructed in 2010, the $5.7 million, 12,000-square-foot contemporary building features a 60-foot-by-24-foot wall of floor-to-ceiling windows, a soaring atrium ceiling, and an indoor garden. The open-space floor plan includes separate areas for adults, teens, and children, as well as two community meeting rooms and three study rooms. It is the first-ever library to serve the West Hill neighborhood, and the first to serve the Arbor Hill, Albany, New York neighborhood since 1970.

The building was designed by architects Hom & Goldman of New York City and built by Sano-Rubin Construction of Albany. The Dormitory Authority of the State of New York managed the project. The Arbor Hill/West Hill Branch of APL received the 2011 Outstanding Public Library Building Award from New York Library Association.

=== Bach Branch ===
Newly constructed in 2009, the $4 million, 8,500-square-foot contemporary building features a glass-walled rotunda that provides sweeping views of New Scotland Avenue. Two walls of windows at the rear of the building showcase the backyard Story Garden. The open-space floor plan includes separate areas for adults, teens, and children, as well as a community meeting room, and two study rooms. The building was named in memory of John J. Bach, a longtime library trustee and New Scotland neighborhood resident who spent his career as a teacher, principal, and superintendent at Albany’s public schools. The Bach Branch continues a tradition of public library service to the New Scotland area neighborhoods since the first New Scotland Branch was established in School 19 in 1944.

The building was designed by architects Hom & Goldman of New York City and built by Sano-Rubin Construction of Albany. The Dormitory Authority of the State of New York managed the project.

=== Delaware Branch ===
The $4.7 million renovation project began on the 9,500-square foot former Chicorelli Funeral Home in October 2008, and it opened its doors to the public on Dec. 28, 2009. While the building retains its distinctive Prairie-style architecture look, the interior has been completely transformed into an open, modern library. The building’s structure and mechanical systems were overhauled, including a new roof, windows, electrical, and energy efficient heating and cooling system. Landscaping included new sidewalks, front and back patios, and plantings. Skylights in the vaulted ceiling let an abundance of natural light into the open, loft-like main floor. The second floor was completely gutted and rebuilt too, and now contains staff offices. The Delaware Branch continues a tradition of public library service to the Delaware Neighborhood since the Albany Free Library established a branch on Delaware Avenue in 1923.

The building was designed by architect CS Arch of Albany and built by Bunkoff General Contractors of Latham. The Dormitory Authority of the State of New York managed the project. The Delaware Branch of APL received the 2010 Outstanding Public Library Building Award from New York Library Association.

=== Howe Branch ===
Originally built in 1929, in 2008 the John A. Howe Branch was the only APL branch that was originally constructed as a library, and it has been serving the South End neighborhoods ever since. The $5.2 million renovation project began in October 2008, and the newly renovated branch opened its doors to the public on March 15, 2010. The 18-month renovation included attaching a two-story addition to the back of the library to provide handicapped access. The addition houses an elevator, stairs, restrooms, and a ground-floor book drop. A high-efficiency heating/cooling system was installed. The historic windows were restored, and much of the library’s original woodwork, cabinetry, and benches were refinished.

The renovation project manager was the Dormitory Authority of the State of New York. The architect was CS Arch of Albany. The builder was Bunkoff General Contractors of Latham. The Howe Branch received the 2010 Preservation Merit Award from the Historic Albany Foundation and the 2010 Historic Preservation/Adaptive Reuse Merit Award from the Eastern New York Chapter of the American Institute of Architects.

=== North Albany Branch ===
The North Albany YMCA was constructed in 2005, and its building plan included a space for a branch of the public library to serve the North Albany, Albany, New York neighborhoods.

=== Pine Hills Branch ===
The Pine Hills Branch had occupied the first floor of the two-story, 19,000-square-foot building that had originally belonged to the New York Telephone Company since 1990. The $4.8 million renovation project began in Fall 2008. The newly renovated library occupies both stories, and it opened its doors to the public on Nov. 16, 2009. Glass-panel windows were installed to define the lobby area. The newly created grand staircase was constructed, and a light monitor was cut into the existing roof. The renovation continued library services in the Pine Hills, Albany, New York neighborhood since the first Pine Hills Branch was opened by the Albany Free Library in 1900.

The project manager was the Dormitory Authority of the State of New York. The architect was CS Arch of Albany. The builder was Bunkoff General Contractors of Latham. The Pine Hills Branch received the 2010 Historic Preservation/Adaptive Reuse Merit Award from the Eastern New York Chapter of the American Institute of Architects.

=== Washington Avenue Branch ===
The current Washington Avenue Branch, formerly known as The Main Library, is a fully functioning neighborhood branch as well as home to APL’s administrative offices. It has been home to the Literacy New York of the Greater Capital Region’s Albany County office since 2008. In 2011, with funds secured by Assemblymember John McEneny, the Pruyn Collection of Albany History moved into a renovated Local History Room on the second floor. From 2013-2015, the Main Library renovated its elevators, HVAC system, and windows with funds from a Construction Grant from the New York State Library’s Division of Library Development. In 2015, Executive Director Scott Jarzombek rebranded the Main Library as the “Washington Avenue Branch,” adding two study rooms, an additional community meeting room, a rehabilitated Youth Services space with separate areas for children and teens, and the Albany Made Creative Lab.

== Special Collections and Services ==
Special collections include the Pruyn Collection of Albany History, Chinese Book Collection, Spanish Book Collection, English as a Second Language (ESL) Collection, Basic Adult Education Collection, Job Information Collection, Small Business Collection, Test Preparation Collection, and Parenting Collection.

Some of the services offered by the library include: programming for children, teens, and adults, downloadable ebooks, audiobooks and magazines, Albany Made Creative and Digital Labs, Art at APL exhibitions, annual summer reading program, annual tax assistance program, High School Equivalency preparation, introductory computer instruction, interlibrary loan, legal and financial resources and workshops, art and crafts workshops, musical performances, movie showings, museum passes, fishing poles, public scanner/copier and fax, public computers and Wi-Fi.

== Awards ==
- 2011 Outstanding Public Library Building Award from New York Library Association (Arbor Hill/West Hill Branch)
- 2010 Outstanding Public Library Building Award from New York Library Association (Delaware Branch)
- 2010 Preservation Merit Award from the Historic Albany Foundation (Howe Branch)
- 2010 Historic Preservation/Adaptive Reuse Merit Award from the Eastern New York Chapter of the American Institute of Architects (Howe Branch)
- 2010 Historic Preservation/Adaptive Reuse Merit Award from the Eastern New York Chapter of the American Institute of Architects (Pine Hills Branch)

== In popular culture ==
In the novel Ironweed by William Kennedy (author), the character Helen “walked toward the Pruyn Library, a haven.”
