= Joseph Rago =

American conservative writer

Joseph Arthur Rago
- Born: January 6, 1983; Ann Arbor, Michigan, U.S.
- Died: July 20, 2017 (aged 34); Manhattan, New York, U.S.
- Education: Dartmouth College
- Occupations: Journalist, columnist
- Website: http://www.josephragomemorialfund.org/

Joseph Rago (January 6, 1983 – July 20, 2017) was a Pulitzer Prize-winning American political writer, best known for his work at The Wall Street Journal.

== Education ==
Rago attended Falmouth High School in Falmouth, Massachusetts, where he was president of the National Honor Society. He graduated in 2001.

Rago graduated with a degree in American history from Dartmouth College in 2005. While there, he wrote for The Dartmouth Review, an independent conservative student newspaper, serving as its editor-in-chief in 2005, and on its board after his graduation. He was also a member of Phi Delta Alpha fraternity.

== Career ==
Rago joined The Wall Street Journal in 2005 as an intern and rose from an assistant editor on the op-ed page to editorial writer to a member of the editorial board. Rago was also a 2010 media fellow at the Stanford University Hoover Institution.

Rago was known for being an outspoken critic of the Patient Protection and Affordable Care Act. In 2011, he captured the Pulitzer Prize for Editorial Writing for what the Pulitzer organization called his "well crafted, against-the-grain editorials challenging the health care reform advocated by President Obama."

== Death ==
In July 2017, Rago was found dead at his East Village, Manhattan apartment; he was 34 years old. In September 2017, New York City's medical examiner office released a statement confirming his cause of death to be sarcoidosis.

According to a 2026 article by Wired, Rago did a blood test through the now-defunct biotechnology company Theranos; Rago's 2013 Wall Street Journal op-ed article on Theranos founder Elizabeth Holmes is considered to have launched her and the company into the public consciousness. The article states that "The city medical examiner said the cause of his death was sarcoidosis, a rare (and rarely fatal), hard-to-diagnose inflammatory disorder. Doctors usually figure it out by excluding other possibilities. Rago didn’t even know he had the disease. But among its signs are elevated levels of vitamin D and angiotensin-converting enzyme. Maybe an honest blood test would have spotted it."
