= Carolina Review =

University of North Carolina student journal

- Type: Student published monthly
- Format: Journal
- Editor-in-chief: Nathan Gibson
- Staff Size: 25
- Founded: 1993
- Political alignment: Conservative, Libertarian
- Headquarters: Chapel Hill, North Carolina
- Website: carolinareviewonline.org

Carolina Review is an independent conservative journal published by undergraduate and graduate students attending the University of North Carolina at Chapel Hill. The Review has been in circulation for nearly 30 years, with the first issue dating back to 1993. The journal prints every month and is composed of original works by student staff writers. It is the only major collegiate publication of its type to have been founded in the early 1990s. Holding to the journal's motto on the cover of recent prints, "Ad Conservandam, Libertatem", the journal is a staunchly conservative and libertarian publication that promotes right-wing politics in their writings.

== History ==
=== Founding and early years ===
Carolina Review (originally named The Carolina Review) was founded at the University of North Carolina at Chapel Hill in 1993 by Dr. Charlton Allen, then attending as an undergraduate student. The journal was able to draw a substantial amount of writers and staff early on, growing to 26 members upon the first release of the journal, and the organization has enjoyed a solid staff base for most of its publication history.

While the 1980 founding of The Dartmouth Review inspired several other conservative publications to appear throughout the Ivy League in the early part of that decade, Carolina Review was the first conservative publication to appear at a "Public Ivy" university. Of its peer members in the Collegiate Network, CR is one of only two to have been founded in the 1990s; others were either founded in the post-Dartmouth stage of the early '80s, or since the 2000s.

In 1996, around 1500 copies of the Review were removed from the newsstand racks by two students. The Daily Tar Heel fought for access to the Honor Court hearing against the offenders, and the subsequent lawsuits led to the state Supreme Court ruling in 1998 that established the University of North Carolina Honor Court as a public body.

=== Stances and early controversies ===
Issue 1 cover

Carolina Review has often opposed many of the progressive reforms that have been put forth on campus. In 1993, the first issue of the Review opposed the construction of the Sonja Hayes Black Cultural Center on UNC's campus, claiming that "on the surface, [the BCC] seems like a good idea. ... It seems the equitable, the conscientious, the, using the liberal buzzword, 'fair' thing to do. Dig a little deeper, however, and you find that not only is it a bad idea, but it goes against the very beliefs of those who fought for civil rights." This stance has been criticized for cultural insensitivity and intolerance towards cultural education.

Examples of continued opposition to campus changes continue to the present day. Leading up to and immediately after the toppling of the Silent Sam statue at the University of North Carolina at Chapel Hill in 2018, several opinion pieces were featured in the journal opposing the take-down of the Confederate monument. Zachary Kosnitzky, a former writer for the Review, stated in The Washington Post that he considered the extralegal takedown of the statue as "mob rule".

There have been accusations of racism levied against the Review. For example, one issue of the Review released in 1996 depicted a Jewish student running for student body president with horns and a pitchfork on the front cover, with the article inside questioning his leadership ability due to his heritage. This led to former chancellor Michael Hooker to censure the Review for a time, at the request of the Anti-Defamation League. After these events, the paper fell into relative obscurity for a time to reassess the tone of the journal, despite staff numbers staying relatively the same.

=== Dwayne Dixon article ===
Carolina Review experienced an explosion in readership in 2018 when the journal criticized Dr. Dwayne Dixon, an Asian Studies professor at the University of North Carolina at Chapel Hill, in an unprecedentedly popular article that highlighted his past actions in light of his political activity on campus earlier that year. The article panned Dixon for receiving two misdemeanor counts of "having a weapon at a public assembly or rally and going armed to the terror of the people" during an unrelated Durham protest in 2017, according to The Herald-Sun. Later that year, Dixon was seen in Chapel Hill brandishing a semi-automatic rifle in a Charlottesville protest. Dixon was generally panned for intimidating protestors at these rallies by many readers, but the Review was criticized by some readers for disregarding his 1st and 2nd Amendment rights that the journal has advocated protecting.

=== Beginning of the 2020s ===
In the late 2010s, the staff size shrunk to around six undergraduate students, down from the original 26 members who contributed to the first issue of Carolina Review. The publication struggled to release new journals to the point where only one issue was released for the 2019–2020 school year. Under the 2020–2021 Editor-in-chief Bryson Piscitelli, an undergraduate student at UNC, the number of contributors and other staff quadrupled in size and regular publication restarted. Multiple issues were released in the fall of 2020 with renewed regularity, along with a special edition for the 2020 United States presidential election. Notable articles in recent issues of the journal include an interview with North Carolina Supreme Court Justice Paul Newby.

== Content ==
Carolina Review often follows the style of other popular journals with similar content, such as The Dartmouth Review. Many articles include submissions from students across numerous majors, and guest writers have been invited to provide input on print. Articles can also be submitted anonymously or under a pseudonym, with mainstays like Charlie Stuart contributing heavily to works there.

The Review generally begins with a foreword from the Editor-in-chief, and articles follow the introduction. Most of these writings consist of commentaries on various social issues, such as patriotism and college life, along with conservative talking points such as gun control or decrying racial unrest in the United States. Various pieces informed on politics have also been written throughout the history of the paper, such as various election editions spanning back to the Bob Dole campaign.

The Review also features satire prominently throughout their issues. The Review often emulates the techniques of various other journals in the Collegiate Network to lighten the tone of the article. "The Rub" is a good example of a stylistic form that the journal has employed throughout the publication's history. Along with cartoons and miscellaneous articles such as film reviews, satire makes up the body of non-article writing in the journal.

== Management and operations ==
Carolina Review is unincorporated and remains a student organization under the UNC system. The editorial staff is headed by an undergraduate editor-in-chief and employs staff members from the undergraduate and graduate schools at the university.

In the fall of 2020, Piscitelli worked to revive the magazine by employing various new staff across the university. Plans to expand an online presence in the wake of COVID-19 were put forth due to the pandemic's effect on physical copy outreach on campus.

Funding for the Review comes primarily from private donations and the Collegiate Network, a syndicate of conservative campus newspapers funded by the Intercollegiate Studies Institute.

== See also ==
- Collegiate Network
- University of North Carolina at Chapel Hill
- The Daily Tar Heel
