= The Indiana Commons =

Online student publication

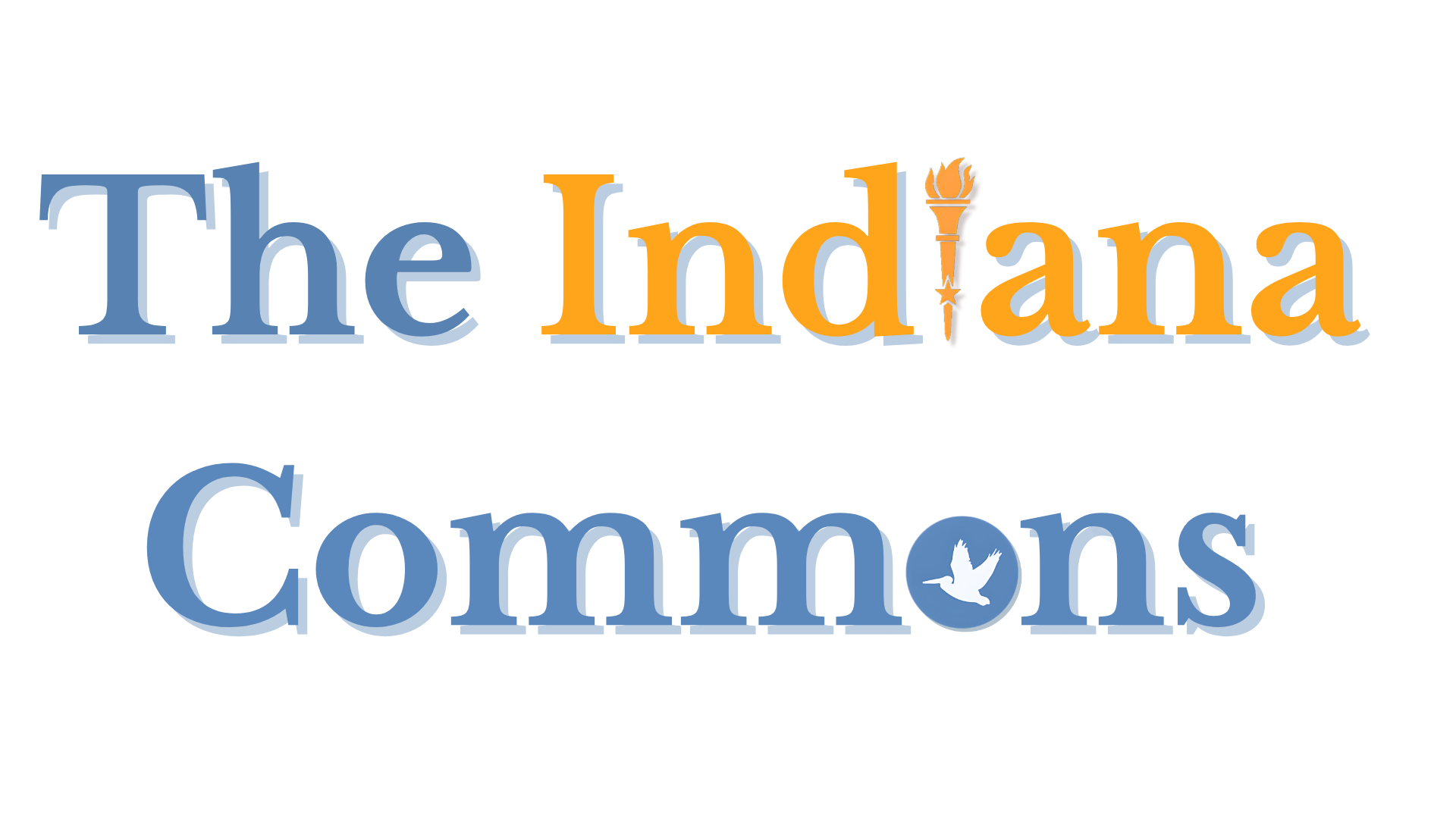
Logo of The Collegiate Commons

The Indiana Commons is a Collegiate Network-affiliated online student publication serving Indiana University-Indianapolis and the surrounding community.It is published by Collegiate Commons, Inc., a 501(c)(3), a news and educational nonprofit and was launched in 2023, and has been cited by local, national and international media outlets and political groups for their investigative journalism.

== History ==
The Indiana Commons was launched as a free online newspaper in August 2023, originally known as The Collegiate Commons. Initially conceived as being a voice for the consistent life ethic on the university campus, several of its early editors, reporters and advisors were involved in anti-abortion activism in the Indianapolis area and nationally. Having been launched the same month as Indiana's partial abortion ban went into effect, many early articles involved state and local responses to the new law.

In September 2023, the publication attracted national attention within the anti-abortion movement for exposing the identity of the owner of a Medium blog and Instagram account that published the personal information of anti-abortion activists.

They also published an exposé revealing wide disparities between the salaries of student government officers at IU and Purdue campuses, which was later cited by the Indiana Daily Student.

The publication's editorial staff also joined other Christian student organizations at IUPUI in opposing Cindy Smock ("Sister Cindy," known for her slogan "Ho No Mo" when preaching on college campuses), when she visited the campus in October 2023, stating in an editorial that "we believe it is the duty of purportedly Christian individuals and organizations on campus to use their power of free speech and their organizing capabilities in a way that does not threaten their witness, nor the witness of other Christians to the world, and to confront those self-professed Christians who do."

In February 2024, the publication attracted national attention after publishing an article about a university-sponsored "bondage workshop" at IUPUI. Backlash from several community members led to the event being cancelled, and the story was subsequently picked up by local media as well as the New York Post, Breitbart, Campus Reform and others.ou

Through a Freedom of Information Act request, Campus Reform uncovered that IUPUI Vice Chancellor of Student Affairs, Dr. Eric Weldy called the publication "illegitimate" and requested staff members to not have any contact with the publication after the article about the bondage event was published, and that the IUPUI Office of Health and Wellness had spent more than $100 on 500 feet of nylon rope and other supplies on the event.

The publication also led an investigation into an underground sex club notorious for covering up the sex crimes of its members, which lead to a local public school employee being fired for their leadership role in the organization and apparent confession to sexual assault. A subsequent investigation into a prostitution ring with university connections landed the publication in court, where they successfully defended against a claim that the article constituted harassment.

The investigative series ultimately led The Indiana Commons being awarded the William F. Buckley Jr. Award for Excellence in Campus Reporting by the Intercollegiate Studies Institute in 2024.

== The American Commons ==
The American Commons was founded in 2018. Several of the founders were members of the American Solidarity Party or the And Campaign. The website largely published columns about national issues and their relation to the consistent life ethic, Christian Social Teaching, and Christian Democracy. It went inactive in 2022, but its archives can be found on the Indiana Commons website.
