= Collegiate Network =

College publications support program

The Collegiate Network logo

The Collegiate Network (CN) is a program that provides financial and technical assistance to student editors and writers of roughly 100 independent, conservative and libertarian publications at colleges and universities around the United States. Member publications have a combined annual distribution of more than two million.

Since 1995, the CN has been administered by the Intercollegiate Studies Institute (ISI), a nonprofit educational organization that promotes conservative thought on college campuses, headquartered in Wilmington, Delaware.

== Mission ==
According to its web site, CN supports college publications which "serve to focus public awareness on the politicization of American college and university classrooms, curricula, student life, and the resulting decline of educational standards." Newspapers and journals in the CN regularly call attention to what they interpret as corruption and hypocrisy in campus administrations' and student groups' policies, argue in favor of free speech in liberal education, encourage discussion and debate, and train students in the principles and practices of journalism.

== History ==
In 1979, the Institute For Educational Affairs (IEA) responded to the request of two University of Chicago students for start-up funding for a new conservative newspaper, Counterpoint. By 1980, the grant program had been expanded and named the Collegiate Network, and by 1983, under the continuing administration of the IEA, had added both internships and persistent operating grants for conservative campus newspapers. In 1990, the Madison Center for Educational Affairs merged with the IEA to maintain funding for what had expanded to 57 conservative student publications. The Intercollegiate Studies Institute took over operations in 1995 and has since administered the CN from Wilmington, Delaware.

== Member publications ==
CN member publications include:

- The American Postliberal, Catholic University of America
- The Brown Spectator, Brown University
- Binghamton Review, Binghamton University
- California Patriot, University of California, Berkeley
- Carolina Review, University of North Carolina at Chapel Hill
- The Capitol Collegian, Florida State University
- The Jacksonian, University of Tennessee
- The Centurion, Rutgers University
- Chicago Thinker, University of Chicago
- The Clock Tower Courier, Saint Louis University
- The Conntrarian, Connecticut College
- The Cornell Review, Cornell University
- The Cougar Chronicle, Brigham Young University
- The Dartmouth Review, Dartmouth College
- The Harvard Ichthus, Harvard University
- The Harvard Salient, Harvard University
- The Kenyon Observer, Kenyon College
- The Michigan Review, University of Michigan
- The Minnesota Republic, University of Minnesota
- The UPenn Statesman, University of Pennsylvania
- The Prince Arthur Herald, McGill University
- Princeton Tory, Princeton University
- The Roar Report, Pennsylvania State University
- The Right Angle, George Washington University
- The Stanford Review, Stanford University
- The Texas Horn, University of Texas at Austin
- Texas Review of Law and Politics, University of Texas at Austin
- The Villanova Times, Villanova University
- The Virginia Informer, College of William & Mary
- The Tower, Trinity University
- The Irish Rover, University of Notre Dame
- The Indiana Commons, Indiana University-Indianapolis
