= William A. Jacobson =

American legal scholar

- Education: Hamilton College (B.A.); Harvard University (J.D.)
- Occupations: Lawyer; Law school professor Blogger
- Employer: Cornell Law School
- Title: Professor

William A. Jacobson is an American lawyer, Cornell Law School clinical professor, and conservative blogger. He is the president and founder of the Legal Insurrection Foundation, and founding director of Cornell's Securities Law Clinic.

== Education ==
Jacobson is a 1981 summa cum laude graduate of Hamilton College. He received his J.D. degree in 1984 from Harvard Law School. During his time at Harvard Law School, Jacobson served as senior editor of the Harvard International Law Journal, for which he wrote a Case Comment entitled "Process Due Resident Aliens Upon Entering the United States," 24 Harv. Int’l Law J. 198, and as Director of Litigation for the Harvard Prison Legal Assistance Project.

== Career ==
=== Early career ===
From 1984 to 1993, Jacobson practiced litigation with Cahill Gordon & Reindel and with Miller & Wrubel in New York City. From 1993 to 2007, he was a litigator in Providence, Rhode Island, with a civil litigation and arbitration practice. His work was focused around investment, employment, and business disputes in the securities industry.

=== Cornell Law School ===
In 2007, Jacobson joined Cornell Law School, where he is a Clinical Professor of Law. He is also the founding director of the law school's Securities Law Clinic, which provides legal services to small investors in upstate New York who have been the victims of investment fraud.

=== Legal Insurrection blog ===
Jacobson is author of the conservative law and politics blog, Legal Insurrection, which he launched in 2008. As of 2011, Legal Insurrection was ranked number 24 in politics, and number 67 overall, by Technorati, and number seven for top legal blogs by Avvo. In 2014, the TaxProf blog ranked Legal Insurrection as the third most visited blog run by a law professor for the year prior. According to Jacobson, Legal Insurrection attracts hundreds of thousands of readers. It has been described as one of the "most popular blogs covering issues ranging from law, politics, to foreign policy.”

=== Legal Insurrection Foundation ===
Jacobson formed the Legal Insurrection Foundation (LIF), which launched in 2019. He launched CriticalRace.org, the website compiles a list of U.S. universities that teach critical race theory and their diversity and inclusion initiatives. Jacobson is also the founder of the Equal Protection Project, an LIF project which focuses litigation against organizations whose goals and policies allegedly violate civil rights laws.

=== Author ===
Jacobson is co-author of the Securities Arbitration Desk Reference (Thomson-Reuters). He is also a regular op-ed columnist.

== Activities ==
=== Israel and Boycott, Divestment, Sanctions (BDS) ===
Jacobson has lobbied against the BDS movement. He has participated in numerous speaking engagements on the matter, most notably events at Harvard Law School (hosted by the Committee for Accuracy in Middle East Reporting in America (CAMERA) in association with Alliance for Israel), Cornell University (sponsored by Cornellians For Israel), Children of Jewish Holocaust Survivors, and the Florida Region of CAMERA.

When Palestinian activist Bassem Tamimi spoke to third graders at an elementary school in Ithaca, New York, in 2015, Jacobson covered the event on his blog. Jacobson filed a Freedom of Information Law request with the Ithaca City School District (ICSD) to further investigate the circumstances surrounding the speaking event. After a year-long court battle with the ICSD demanding that the ICSD remove extensive redactions in the documents provided, a judge sided with Jacobson, after which the ICSD was ordered to release the video of the event. That video included one of the speakers saying to the children, "You can defend us, you can be freedom fighters for Palestine, you can bring peace;" a child is also heard saying, "When I grow up, I'm going to go to Palestine and protest."

In 2019, Jacobson discussed the BDS movement on college campuses during a Department of Justice summit on combating anti-Semitism.

=== YouTube ===
On January 13, 2017, Jacobson's YouTube channel was taken down, with YouTube citing copyright violations. However, Jacobson stated that he was targeted for his conservative political views. His channel was restored on January 15, 2017.

=== Race ===
In 2020, Jacobson authored two articles that criticized the history of Black Lives Matter. Jacobson described Black Lives Matter's founders as "anti-American, anti-capitalist activists, who want to destroy capitalism, in an act of revenge." This caused controversy and Cornell Law School students called for action against him. Peter Wood, president of the National Scholars Association, came to Jacobson's defense.

=== Federal COVID-19 lawsuit ===
In 2022, Jacobson filed a federal class-action lawsuit against Mary T. Bassett, Acting Commissioner of the New York Department of Health, challenging the constitutionality of a state health department directive that considered race as a risk factor in the distribution of COVID-19 treatments. The lawsuit argued that the department directive was "patently unconstitutional" because it used racial preferences in determining whether someone qualified to receive medical treatment, violating the Fourteenth Amendment, the Civil Rights Act, and other federal statutes.

== Awards ==
- Blogger of the Year, Conservative Political Action Conference Red Carpet Bloggers Awards, 2014
