= Gregory Fossedal =

US political/economic advisor (born 1959)

- Born: 1959 (age 65–66)

Gregory Fossedal (born 1959) is an American writer and political/economic theorist. He served as chairman of the Alexis de Tocqueville Institution. Fossedal, Gordon Haff, Benjamin Hart, and Keeney Jones founded the Dartmouth Review in 1980. Fossedal graduated from Dartmouth College in 1981 magna cum laude with an A.B. in English literature.

== Past positions ==
- 1998–2004: president of Emerging Markets Group
- 1992–1997: director of the emerging markets division at Lehrman Bell Mueller Cannon in Arlington, Virginia
- 1986–1991: research fellow at the Hoover Institution at Stanford University, California
- 1983–1986: editorial writer for The Wall Street Journal

== Current positions ==
- Chief Investment Officer, Democratic Century Fund, managed by the Emerging Markets Group
- Member of the board of directors of the Democracy Foundation
- Senior associate of SRS Investments (Zurich, Switzerland) - advises investors on national and global ideopolitical trends, and develops investment products for the securities industry.
- UPI columnist
- Executive committee chairman of the Ernest Martin Hopkins Institution, an independent association of Dartmouth alumni which encourages conservative social and political activists at the College
- Associate Editor of EducationNews.org

== Selected publications ==
External videos
- Booknotes interview with Fossedal on The Democratic Imperative, May 21, 1989, C-SPAN

- Direct Democracy in Switzerland, (Transaction Publishers, 2002). Fossedal makes a strong case for the introduction of the Swiss style of government in other Western European countries, the United States and many of the globe's nascent democracies. Fossedal discusses the benefits and viability of direct democracy and how and why it should be implemented elsewhere in the world.
- The Democratic Imperative: Exporting the American Revolution (New Republic Books, 1989), economic and political history
- Marshall Plan Commemorative Section: Miles to Go: From American Plan to European Union Helmut Schmidt. A look back at perhaps the most important foreign policy success of the postwar period. Edited by Peter Grose, with contributions by historians Diane B. Kunz and David Reynolds, a memoir by Charles P. Kindleberger, a profile of Marshall and Acheson by James Chace and one of Will Clayton by Gregory Fossedal and Bill Mikhail; reflections from Roy Jenkins, Walt Rostow, and Helmut Schmidt.
- Fossedal, Gregory A. (1993). Our Finest Hour: Will Clayton, the Marshall Plan, and the Triumph of Democracy. Stanford, CA: Hoover Institution Press. ISBN 978-0-8179-9202-6. A biography of William L. Clayton.

== See also ==
- Phi Beta Kappa
- Wall Street Journal
