= Legal Insurrection Foundation =

American nonprofit organization

The Legal Insurrection Foundation (abbreviated LIF) is an American nonprofit conservative advocacy organization which focuses on issues concerning academia. Launched in 2019, LIF is based in Rhode Island. As of 2025, its president is William A. Jacobson. The foundation has participated in 2020s controversies around critical race theory and has criticized diversity, equity, and inclusion initiatives which it alleges violate civil rights laws by discriminating against white people, Asians, and others.

== Initiatives ==
=== Legal Insurrection ===
LIF publishes the Legal Insurrection blog, which provides news coverage and analysis of American politics, U.S. foreign policy, critical race theory, "cancel culture," legal issues, and other topics. The Philanthropy Roundtable has described Legal Insurrection as a "leading website for conservative law and politics,” while Fox News says it is "influential" among conservatives.

=== CriticalRace.org ===
The foundation maintains the website Critical Race Training in Education at the domain CriticalRace.org. The website compiles a list of U.S. universities that teach critical race theory and their diversity and inclusion initiatives. The project, which has been featured on Fox News, Fox Business, and other platforms, included over 700 colleges and universities in the United States as of 2024.

In 2022, LIF criticized an American Bar Association mandate that requires "education to law students on bias, cross-cultural competency, and racism" from its accredited schools. In 2023, the foundation sent a cease-and-desist letter to Albany Public Library for its two-month privately funded internship program offered to black-only library school graduates. The library also had several unfilled positions open to any applicant.

Also in 2022, LIF filed a civil rights complaint against the Rhode Island Department of Education and Providence Public School District (PPSD), alleging that the PPSD's Educators of Color Loan Forgiveness Program racially discriminated against white teachers. This led to a Department of Justice lawsuit against the PPSD. That same year, the Equal Employment Opportunity Commission completed an investigation into the PPSD and found that it likely the violated the Civil Rights Act.

=== Equal Protection Project ===
In February 2023, the foundation started the "Equal Protection Project" (EPP), which the Washington Post later described as "a legal organization that opposes race-based affirmative action." The EPP accused Missouri State University of discriminating against white males for hosting a privately funded boot camp program for minority or women small business owners. The university responded that it would implement changes to the program in the future in response to the allegation. In July 2023, the EPP filed a complaint with the U.S. Department of Education regarding a whites-only anti-racism seminary offered by New York University.

In 2024, MIT responded to a federal discrimination complaint filed by the EPP regarding a program run by MIT's “Office of Minority Education” exclusively for women of color by altering its website the following day. That following month, following an EPP complaint, the Ithaca City School District apologized for organizing a "students of color"-only event. In March 2025, the Education Department launched an investigation into the Ithaca City School District, based on an EPP complaint that alleged anti-white racial exclusion. Since its founding, the EPP has challenged more than 600 programs and scholarships it considers discriminatory at over 125 colleges and universities.
