= L.A. Kauffman =

L.A. Kauffman is an American grassroots political organizer, activist, and journalist. She writes about the history and impact of various protest movements, including the civil rights movement, protests against the US invasion of Iraq, and the 2017 Women's March. She is the author of "How To Read A Protest: The Art of Organizing and Resistance," published by University of California Press in 2018, and "Direct Action: Protest and the Reinvention of American Radicalism," published by Verso Books in 2017. Her journalistic work has appeared various publications, including The Guardian, N+1, and Boston Review.

== Early life ==
Kauffman grew up in Milwaukee, Wisconsin. She was initially drawn to activism due to her interest in reproductive rights, and she became involved in the National Organization for Women in Milwaukee. She later attended Princeton University. In college, she participated in the Anti-Apartheid Movement. She graduated from Princeton in 1987.

== Activism ==
After Kauffman graduated from college, she became the executive editor of Socialist Review. As a writer and activist, Kauffman was particularly interested in how activist movements had changed since the 1960s, including the activism of ACT UP. She eventually left the Socialist Review to write a book. She explained, "I was trying to make sense of how the larger left political landscape had shifted and what was new and distinctive about radicalism in that time." In total, she spent 25 years writing her book.

Following her departure from Socialist Review, Kauffman studied and participated in the global justice movement, although she witnessed the collapse of the movement after the September 11 attacks. She has been involved in efforts to save community gardens, libraries, and other communal spaces. In 2019, Kauffman distributed a parody version of the Washington Post with a cover story claiming that Donald Trump had vanished from the White House.

== Books ==
In 2014, Kauffman resolved to finish her book as "... my 50th birthday present to myself." The resulting book, "Direct Action: Protest and the Reinvention of American Radicalism" focused on the various goals, tactics, participants, and impact of direct action movements. She followed this book with "How To Read A Protest: The Art of Organizing and Resistance," which focused on the historical impact of protest marches, including the 1963 March on Washington and the 2017 Women's March.
