= Ilkka Tuomi =

Finnish computer scientist

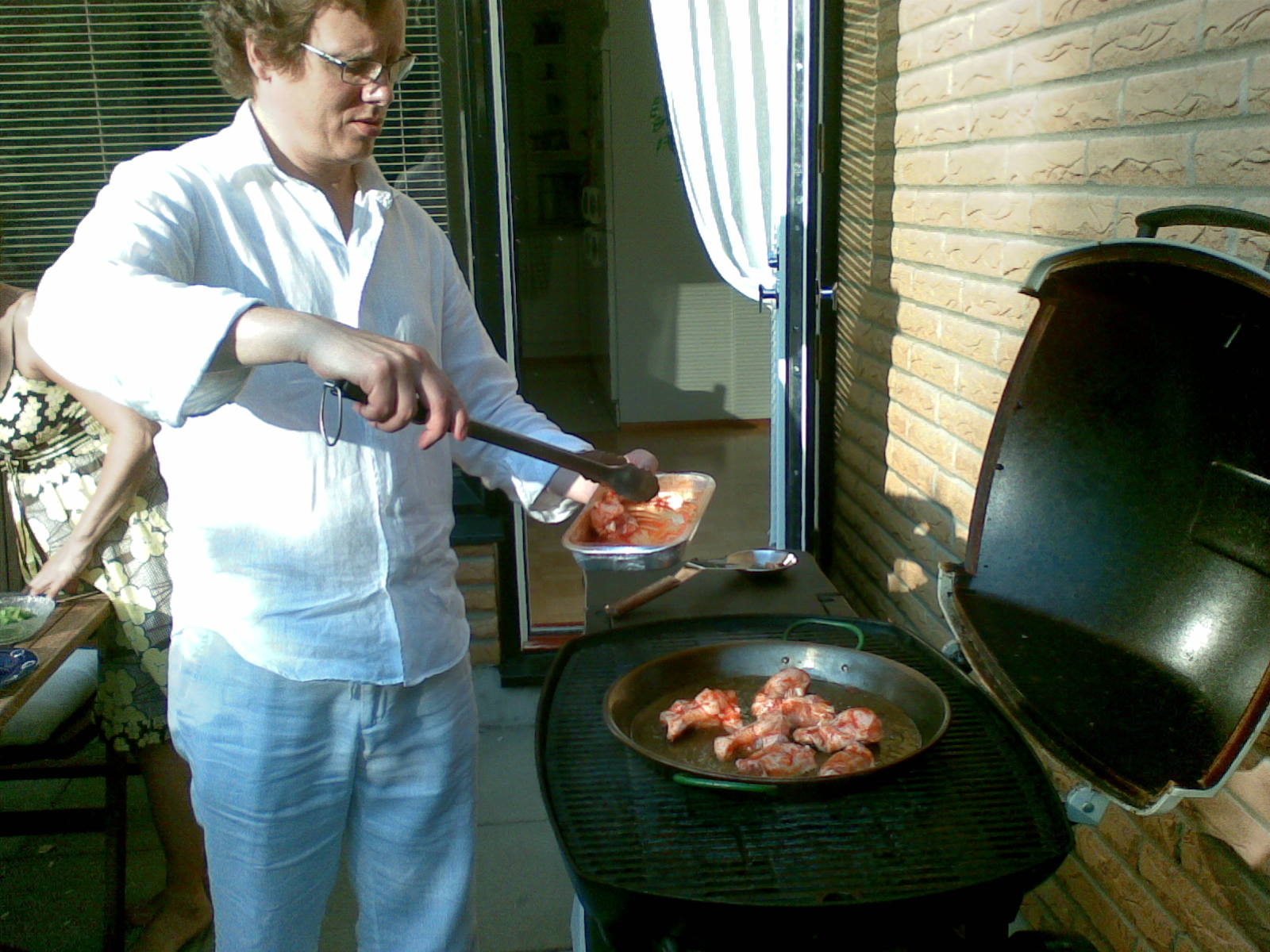
- Born: 26 September 1958 (age 67)

Ilkka Tuomi (born 26 September 1958) is a Finnish computer scientist, noted for writings on the subject of the Internet.

== Works ==
Ilkka Tuomi has written books, including Networks of Innovation: Change and Meaning in the Age of the Internet which develops theory of open innovation based on analysis of Internet-related innovations and open source, and Corporate Knowledge: Theory and Practice of Intelligent Organizations, which develops theory of knowledge management.

Tuomi has written several articles in First Monday, an important peer reviewed journal on the Internet. The most famous of Tuomi's articles is probably The Lives and Death of Moore's Law , in which Tuomi states that Moore's law is an expression of technological determinism, used sloppily, and to a large extent not properly founded in empirical studies. This article has an associated response from Ray Kurzweil at: Exponential Growth:-An Illusion (Response to Ilkka Tuomi) and a comment on the response at: Response to Kurzweil.

== Career ==
Ilkka Tuomi was a staff member of the Institute for Prospective Technological Studies. He has also been a principal scientist at the Nokia Research Center. He is chief scientist at Oy Meaning Processing Ltd., an independent research institute founded in 2005 and located in Finland.
