= Alexis de Tocqueville Institution =

American conservative think tank

- Abbreviation: AdTI
- Named after: Alexis de Tocqueville
- Formation: 29 July 1985
- Dissolved: 2007
- Type: 501(c)(3)
- Headquarters: New York City, U.S.
- President: Ken Brown
- Chairman: Gregory Fossedal

The Alexis de Tocqueville Institution (AdTI) was a Washington, D.C.–based think tank.

AdTI was named after the French historian Alexis de Tocqueville. Founded in 1988, its president was Ken Brown and its chairman was Gregory Fossedal. At its peak it had 14 full-time staff researchers. In 2006, the organization ceased most operations, issuing its last press release in 2007 to announce that its former chairman, Mike Gravel, was running for President of the United States.

== Activities ==
=== Intellectual property studies ===
The AdTI published a series of studies beginning in 2002 on the theme of intellectual property in the software industry. The Institution authored Opening the Open Source Debate (June 2002), a report critical of Microsoft's open-source rivals. This report claimed that open source software was inherently less secure than proprietary software and hence a particular target for terrorists.

These studies culminated in Samizdat: And Other Issues Regarding the 'Source' of Open Source Code (prereleased May 2004), questioning the generally accepted provenance of Linux and other open source projects, and recommending that government-funded programming should never be licensed under the GNU General Public License but under the BSD license or similar licenses. While the book called for increased investment in open source development, it criticized what it called "hybrid" source models, in which true open source code is mixed with proprietary code, with the result that intellectual property rights are nullified.

To illustrate potential problems with this approach, the book cited the case of Linus Torvalds, creator of Linux. It claimed Torvalds used source code taken from Minix, a small Unix-like operating system used in teaching computer science, to create Linux 0.01, on the theory that no mere student could write an entire Unix-like kernel single-handedly—although writing a kernel of similar size and capabilities is a standard part of many computer science degrees. These claims have been seriously questioned, including by many of those quoted in support, such as Andrew S. Tanenbaum, author of Minix; Dennis Ritchie, one of the creators of Unix; and Richard Stallman, leader of the GNU project. Others have said that quotes attributed as being from an "interview with AdTI" were in fact from prerelease papers (Ilkka Tuomi) or from message board posts (Charles Mills, Henry Jones). Alexey Toptygin said he had been commissioned by Brown to find similarities between Minix and Linux 0.01 source code, and found no support for the theory that Minix source code had been used to create Linux; this study is not mentioned in the book.

It cited a number of arguments for the claim, including an email from Tanenbaum saying MINIX "was the base" Torvalds used to create Linux. Tanenbaum later published a refutation of the book's interpretation, wherein he recounted an interview with Ken Brown while the latter was researching the book, during which Tanenbaum had emphatically stated his belief that Torvalds wrote Linux single-handedly and provided examples of other people or small teams who had performed similar feats in the past.

The AdTI was preparing a new study in November 2004, tentatively titled Intellectual Property Left, to argue that "the IT industry sector's reluctance to pursue rampant IP infringement against public domain software developers and users is going to precipitate billions of dollars in balance sheet downgrades by Wall Street." The later papers stand in contrast to the Institution's 2000 paper, The Market Place Should Rule on Technology, which discusses Linux as a direct competitor to Microsoft Windows.

=== Other publications ===
The AdTI produced a number of papers on education policy.

When the B-2 bomber program was threatened in 1995, the AdTI organised a letter to President Bill Clinton signed by seven former Pentagon chiefs: Dick Cheney, Caspar Weinberger, Frank Carlucci, Harold Brown, James Schlesinger, Donald Rumsfeld and Melvin Laird.

The AdTI published Newt Gingrich's 2003 book, Saving Lives & Saving Money: Transforming Health and Healthcare.

AdTI was a member organization of the Cooler Heads Coalition which asserts that "the science of global warming is uncertain" and is focused on "dispelling the myths of global warming by exposing flawed economic, scientific, and risk analysis".

== Funding ==
Microsoft had been one of the Institution's backers for five years, although a Microsoft spokesman said they had not funded any specific research.
