= Brown Political Review =

American student-run political magazine

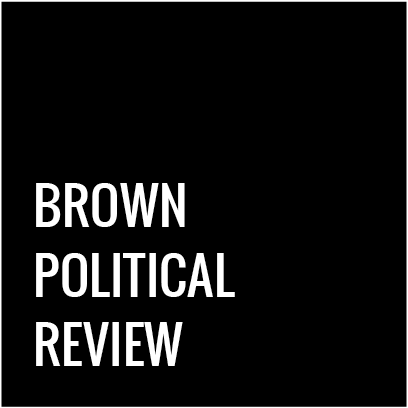
- Editors-in-Chief: Mitsuki Jiang, Julianna Muzyczyszyn
- Categories: Politics, policy, culture
- Frequency: Quarterly
- Total circulation: 10,000
- Founded: 2012
- Based in: Providence, Rhode Island, U.S.
- Language: English
- Website: brownpoliticalreview.org

The Brown Political Review (BPR) is a quarterly, student-run political magazine and website at Brown University in Providence, Rhode Island. It covers the politics of regional, domestic and international affairs, the political culture and dialogue at Brown and the ongoing state of political journalism in the United States. BPR is managed and edited by undergraduate students of Brown University, and features writing from staff contributors and submissions from the Brown community. The magazine also features original interviews and media productions, as well as student artwork from Brown and the nearby Rhode Island School of Design. It is sponsored by Brown University’s Center for Philosophy, Politics, and Economics.

== Background ==
=== Founding ===
The magazine was founded in 2012 by Brown undergraduates. It receives financial sponsorship from the Political Theory Project, an interdisciplinary think tank at Brown that has attracted criticism for acceptance of gifts from conservative foundations. The magazine was conceived as a destination for political news analysis, emphasizing strength of argument and well crafted reporting over partisan status or ideology.

=== Present ===
The magazine features the original writing and reporting of students at Brown. Staff writers and columnists contribute daily to BrownPoliticalReview.org, while a quarterly print edition features articles developed through student pitches selected anonymously by BPR's editorial board.

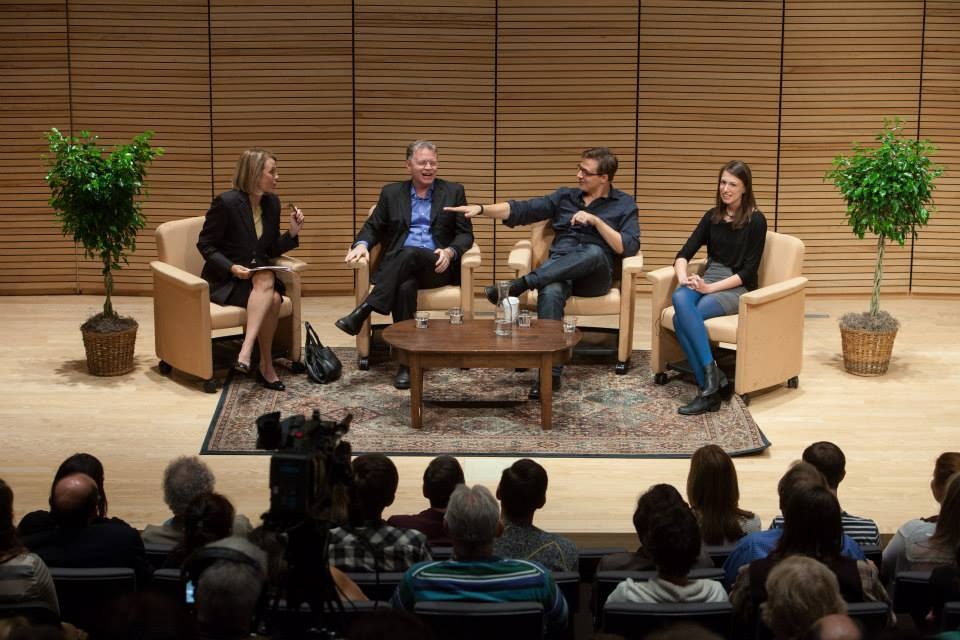
BPR's 2013 media panel, "Investigative Journalism in the Age of Polarization." From left: Tracy Breton, David Rohde, Chris Hayes, Dana Goldstein.

The magazine is also known for its extensive interviews section featuring notable political figures including World Bank President Jim Yong Kim; Grover Norquist, founder of Americans for Tax Reform; former governor and presidential candidate Howard Dean; Tom Donohue, CEO of the U.S. Chamber of Commerce; and numerous senators and governors. The magazine has also interviewed prominent journalists, including Arianna Huffington, Ezra Klein, Tucker Carlson, David Frum, Sebastian Junger and Josh Marshall. BPR's filmed feature interviews include Governor Lincoln Chafee and MSNBC's Chris Hayes.

In October 2013, BPR hosted its first alumni panel in conjunction with Brown University, titled "Investigative Journalism in the Age of Polarization." The panel featured journalists Chris Hayes, David Rohde, and Dana Goldstein.

In 2018, BPR started a radio podcast that publishes regularly on SoundCloud and iTunes.

=== Staff ===
Brown Political Review has a staff of over 215 students, making it one of the largest student organizations at Brown. It is also the largest political publication in the Ivy League. Staff members contribute to eight different boards: editorial, interviews, business, multimedia, creative, copy editorial, data, and web. The current executive team is made up of Editors in Chief Mitsuki Jiang and Julianna Muzyczyszyn, Chiefs of Staff Tiziano Pardo and Guilherme Sequeira, Chief Operating Officers Siyuan (Michael) Shui and Will Thomas, and Chief Copy Editors Vivian Chute & Nicholas Clampitt.

Writers have had commentary featured and included on Fox News, MSNBC, Huffington Post and Slate.

== Controversies ==
=== Jesse Watters ===
On October 3, 2013, Jesse Watters, a correspondent of FOX’s The O’Reilly Factor, visited Brown to showcase a student event titled “Nudity in the Upsace” for his television segment, “Watters World.” The student event was intended to “confront stigmas about the naked body.” Watters stood outside the event and questioned exiting students on camera about their participation. During the same week, BPR Media featured a series of interviews with some of the students confronted by Watters, which was later replayed on The O’Reilly Factor where Watters and O’Reilly debated the footage. During one exchange, Watters told host Bill O'Reilly that campus-wide coverage helped bring about a change of heart, saying, “They persuaded me,” adding, “I think there is some value in it.”

=== Ray Kelly ===
On October 29, 2013, then New York City Police Commissioner Ray Kelly visited Brown University to deliver a lecture titled, “Proactive Policing in America's Biggest City.” Student demonstrators convened outside the event location to protest what they perceived as racial disparities among law enforcement in New York City, including the controversial "stop-and-frisk" practice used by police officers. Students and community members inside the auditorium then mounted a protest that prevented Commissioner Kelly from speaking, leading to the cancellation of the event and briefly sparking a national news story. BPR Media featured a documentary account of the events inside the auditorium, "The Kelly Protest From the Inside", footage that was later featured and debated on FOX News and MSNBC. BPR later obtained an exclusive leak of Kelly’s undelivered remarks, publishing the speech alongside an explanatory note titled, “Why The Editors Published Ray Kelly.”

== See also ==
- The Brown Spectator
- The Stanford Review
- Columbia Political Review
- Berkeley Political Review
- Harvard Political Review
