= Ron Palmeri =

American venture capitalist

- Born: New York City
- Occupation: Venture capitalist
- Years active: 2005–present
- Employer: Ron Palmeri
- Known for: Prism Skylabs; Minor Ventures

Ron Palmeri is an American venture capitalist and entrepreneur. In 2011, Palmeri co-founded Prism Skylabs, a technology company that optimizes offline commerce. The founders he works with describe him as a "dedicated coach who gives excellent advice."

== Biography ==
Palmeri was born in New York, New York. He graduated from Middlebury College with Bachelor of Arts degrees in both History and French, and also attended SciencesPo in Paris. He moved to San Francisco, California after college.

== Minor Venutures ==
Previously, Palmeri ran Minor Ventures, a technology-focused venture capital firm. In 2012, Palmeri began MkII Ventures, which provided funding for Prism Skylabs.

== Layer ==
Palmeri is a Co-Founder of Layer, winner of Techcrunch Disrupt SF 2013. Layer is a communications platform for the internet.
