= The Stanford Flipside =

Satirical university publication

The Stanford Flipside is an undergraduate satire publication published at Stanford University.

== History ==
The Stanford Flipside was founded in 2008 by Jeremy Keeshin. The publication was printed as a weekly leaflet distributed to campus residences and dining halls. In 2012, editorial control was passed on and the paper remains run by students at Stanford.

== Style and content ==
The Stanford Flipside is known for its irreverent satirical humor. It publishes articles, standalone headlines, and puzzles.

== See also ==
- Stanford Chaparral
- The Stanford Daily
- The Fountain Hopper
