= The Fountain Hopper =

Stanford University student publication

- Type: Student publication
- Format: Newsletter
- Founder: Ilya Mouzykantskii
- Editor-in-chief: Anonymous
- Founded: September 2014
- Language: English
- Headquarters: Stanford, CA
- Circulation: 12,000
- Website: fountainhopper.com

The Fountain Hopper or FoHo is an anonymous email-based student publication serving Stanford University. It consists of an irregular newsletter with original reporting and a digest of Stanford-related news. Unlike other publications serving the Stanford community, it is fully independent, taking no money from either the University or the student union. The Fountain Hopper has broken several stories of national importance, including People v. Turner.

== History ==
The Fountain Hopper was founded in September 2014 by Ilya Mouzykantskii, then a junior at Stanford University majoring in symbolic systems. The publication operated on a shoestring budget of under $5,000 for its first 24 months, and continues to be funded entirely by student donations.

== Notable reporting ==
In January 2015, The Fountain Hopper broke the Brock Turner story. Three years later, The Fountain Hopper reported that Stanford repeatedly rejected the victim's choice of quotes for a memorial plaque that the university had promised to place at the site of the crime.

Later in 2015, The Fountain Hopper initiated a campaign informing Stanford students to of their right to access their admissions files through an obscure provision in FERPA, a federal law governing access to educational records. Over 2,800 Stanford students submitted FERPA requests. Students at colleges around the US filed FERPA requests of their own, leading to universities across the US releasing previously private records relating to college admissions and changing their file retention policies.

In March 2015, The Fountain Hopper collaborated with Vice to break the story of a Stanford Medical School student who, over the course of several months, poisoned her classmates with paraformaldehyde. The story garnered significant attention in Singapore, as the accused was an A*Star scholar.

In January 2018, FoHo reported on a Stanford admissions officer, Karen Alonzo, who used the official Stanford Instagram account to like her personal photographs. Stanford subsequently removed her name from the list of admissions officers, reassigning her applicant territories to another admissions officer.

== See also ==
- The Stanford Daily
- The Stanford Review
- Stanford Chaparral
- The Stanford Flipside
