= American Thunder =

American Thunder may refer to:

- American Thunder: NASCAR to Le Mans, a 2025 documentary surrounding NASCAR and Hendrick Motorsports' efforts in the 2023 24 Hours of Le Mans
- American Thunder (TV series), a television series aired on Speed channel
- American Thunder (roller coaster), a roller coaster of Six Flags St. Louis
- American Thunder (magazine), a short-lived 2004 American magazine
