= Wendy McElroy =

Canadian anarchist and feminist (born 1951)

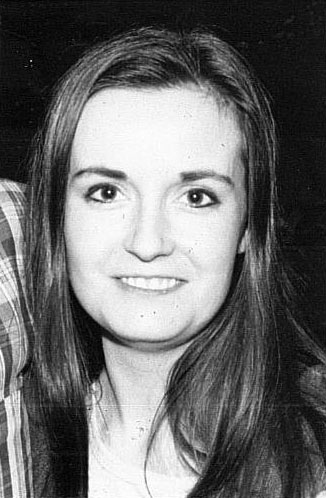
- Born: 1951 (age 74–75)
- Occupation: Writer

Wendy McElroy (born 1951) is a Canadian individualist feminist and voluntaryist writer. McElroy is the editor of the website ifeminists.net.

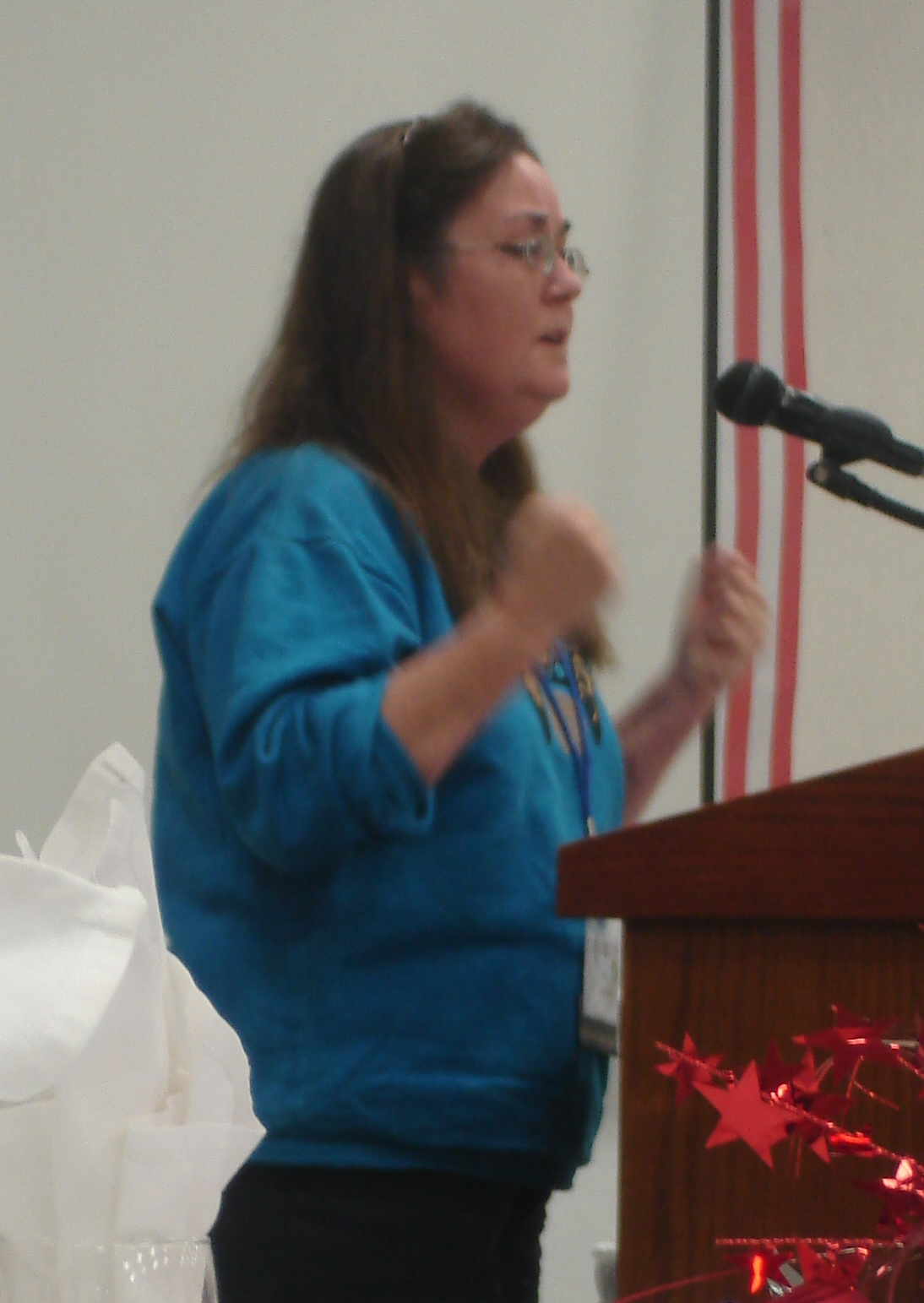
Wendy McElroy speaking in Springfield, Illinois, September 16, 2006

McElroy is the author of the book Rape Culture Hysteria, in which she contends that rape culture is a result of popular hysteria to the disadvantage of men, and in particular, white men.

In November 2014, McElroy was scheduled to debate Jessica Valenti at a Brown University Janus Forum debate on "How Should Colleges Handle Sexual Assault?". Before the debate, Brown President Christina Paxson sent out a campus-wide e-mail saying she disagreed with McElroy's views, and set up an alternative event at the same time to compete with the debate. The actions of Brown students and Paxson were criticized by various commentators.

== Published works ==
Books

- National Identification Systems: Essays in Opposition, by Carl Watner, Wendy McElroy, 2004 ISBN 0786415959
- Debates of Liberty: An Overview of Individualist Anarchism, 1881–1908, 2003 ISBN 073910473X
- Liberty for Women: Freedom and Feminism in the Twenty-First Century. Chicago: Ivan R. Dee. 2002. ISBN 978-1566634359. OCLC 260069067.
- Sexual Correctness: The Gender-Feminist Attack on Women, 2001
- Dissenting Electorate: Those Who Refuse to Vote and the Legitimacy of Their Opposition by Carl Watner, Wendy McElroy, 2001
- Individualist Feminism of the Nineteenth Century: Collected Writings and Biographical Profiles, 2001
- Queen Silver: The Godless Girl (Women's Studies (Amherst, NY), Queen Selections Silver, 1999 – about her friend Queen Selections Silver.
- Freedom, Feminism, and the State by Wendy McElroy, Lewis Perry, 1999
- The Reasonable Woman: A Guide to Intellectual Survival, 1998
- XXX: A Woman's Right to Pornography Prelude Press, 1995, ISBN 0312136269
- Liberty, 1881–1908: A Comprehensive Index, 1982

Articles

- McElroy, Wendy (2008). Hamowy, Ronald (ed.). The Encyclopedia of Libertarianism. Thousand Oaks, CA: Sage; Cato Institute. doi:10.4135/9781412965811. ISBN 978-1412965804. LCCN 2008009151. OCLC 750831024.
  - "Feminism and Women's Rights". The Encyclopedia of Libertarianism. 2008. pp. 173–176. doi:10.4135/9781412965811.n106. ISBN 9781412965804.
  - "Godwin, William (1856–1836)". The Encyclopedia of Libertarianism. 2008. p. 211. doi:10.4135/9781412965811.n126. ISBN 9781412965804.
  - "Price, Richard (1723–1791)". The Encyclopedia of Libertarianism. 2008. pp. 388–389. doi:10.4135/9781412965811.n240. ISBN 9781412965804.
  - "Voltaire (1694–1778)". The Encyclopedia of Libertarianism. 2008. p. 523. doi:10.4135/9781412965811.n319. ISBN 9781412965804.
  - "Voluntarism". The Encyclopedia of Libertarianism. 2008. p. 524. doi:10.4135/9781412965811.n320. ISBN 9781412965804.
  - "Wollstonecraft, Mary (1759–1797)". The Encyclopedia of Libertarianism. 2008. pp. 545–546. doi:10.4135/9781412965811.n331. ISBN 9781412965804.
