= Bristow Adams =

American journalist, professor, forester, and illustrator (1875-1956)

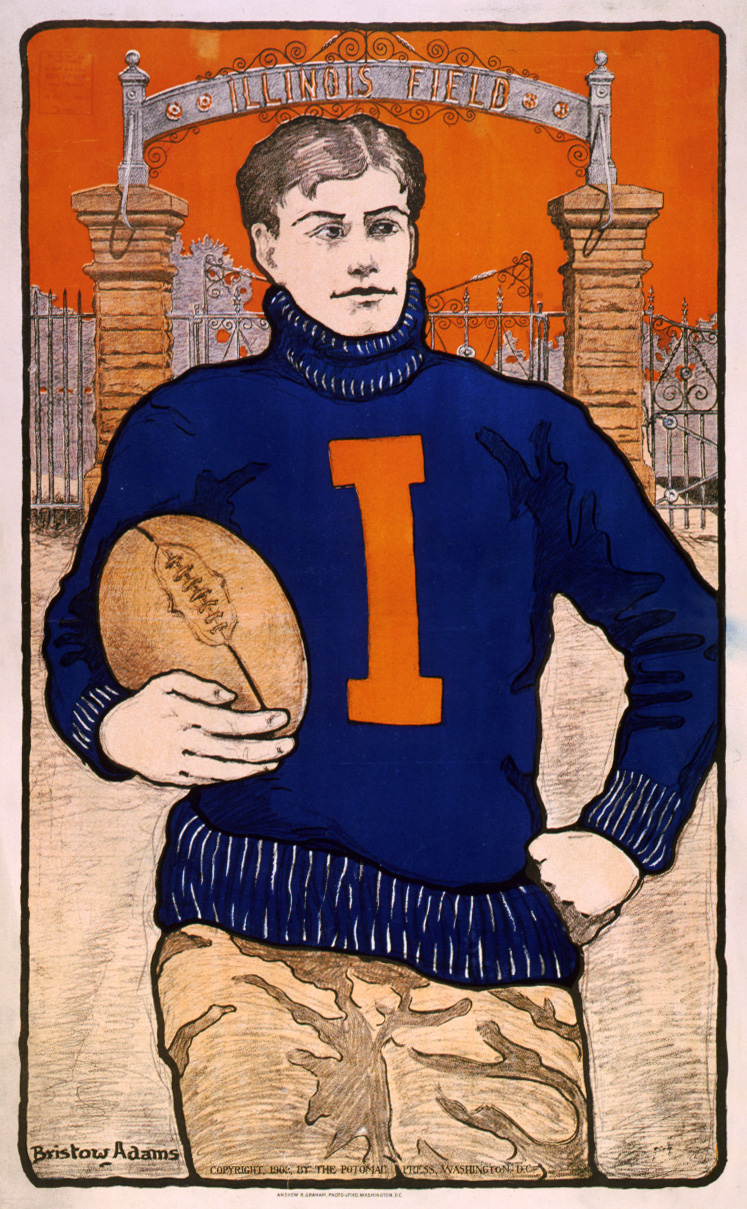
A Bristow Adams poster of a University of Illinois football player

Bristow Adams (November 11, 1875 – November 1956) was an American journalist, professor, forester, and illustrator.

Adams was born in Washington, D.C. He taught at Cornell University from 1914 to 1945. Adams also founded the Stanford Chaparral, the oldest humor magazine in the west, in 1899.

Adams created at least two scarce large photolithographed rowing posters between 1900 and 1910, one representing Harvard and one Cornell, both copyrighted by The Potomac Press, Washington, D.C., and printed by Andrew B. Graham of Washington.
