= Adora Svitak =

American writer

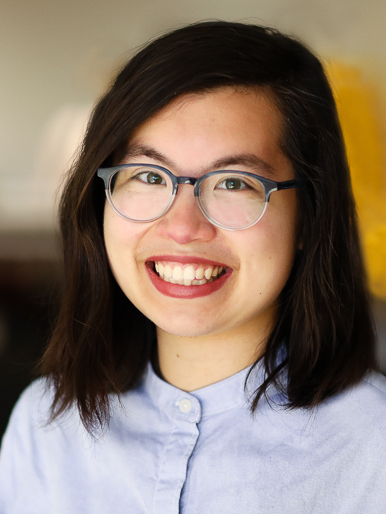
- Svitak for the Wikimedia Foundation, 2019.
- Born: October 15, 1997 (age 29); Springfield, Oregon, U.S.
- Education: University of California, Berkeley (BA)
- Occupations: Public speaker; writer; activist
- Website: adorasvitak.com

Adora Svitak (born October 15, 1997) is an American writer, public speaker, former child prodigy, and activist. She was a communications associate at the Wikimedia Foundation from 2019 to 2021.

== Early life ==
Svitak was born in Springfield, Oregon. Her mother, Joyce, was a Chinese immigrant who grew up during the Cultural Revolution. Her father, John, studied physics and worked as a software engineer. She got her first computer at age 6 and began to write short stories on it.

== Public speaking ==
Svitak's February 2010 TED Talk, "What Adults Can Learn From Kids," has received over 6.3 million views to date on TED.com.

- InfoCom 2013 closing keynote, Calcutta, India, December 7, 2013.
- INK Talks (in association with TED) in Lavasa, India, December 2010, speaking on how young people use technology in the modern world.
- United Nations Economic and Social Council Youth Forum Conference, keynote with Secretary-General Ban Ki-moon in attendance. New York, March 2013.
- Girls' State of the Union at National Press Club, Keynote, Washington, D.C., January 2013, introduced by Gloria Steinem.
- Mashable Social Good Summit, Speaker, New York, NY, September 2012.
- ECIS (European Council of International Schools) keynote in Nice, France and visit to speak to students at the Dubai Women's College.

In 2015, Svitak addressed the National School Boards Association in an "Un-General" session and followed up with an extended session on encouragement of writing and reading that is relevant to students.

== TEDxRedmond ==
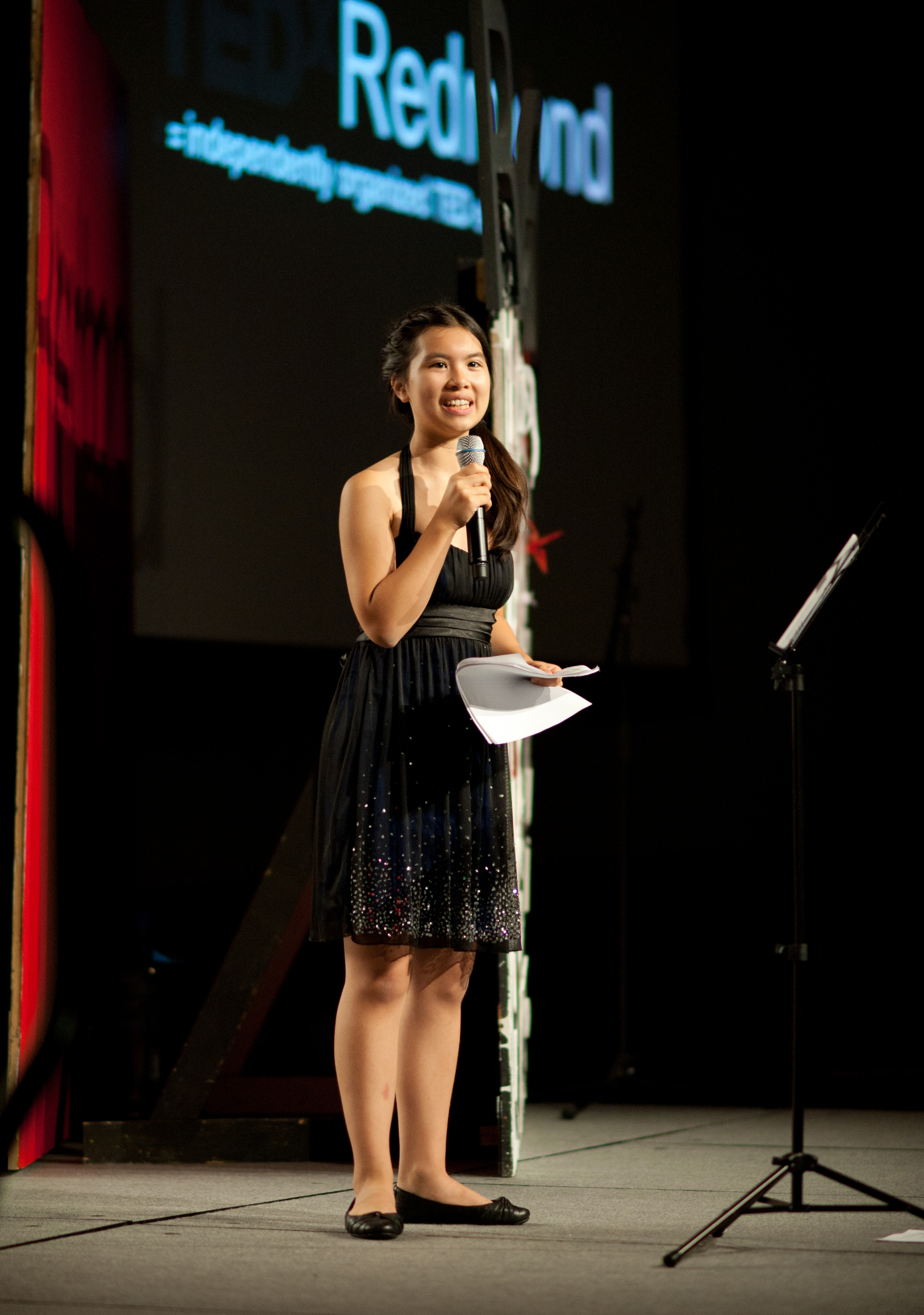
Svitak as Curator of TEDxRedmond, 2012.

From 2010 to 2013, Adora organized the annual TEDx (x = independently organized TED event) conference TEDxRedmond with an all-youth planning committee. The conference took place at the Microsoft Conference Center in Redmond, WA. Over 700 people attended the inaugural conference in September 2010. Svitak said in a Microsoft interview that she hopes TEDxRedmond attendees are empowered by participating, adding, "I would love to see kids taking up issues that were important to them, whether it's something that needs fixing at their school, or an environmental program that they'd like to start. I want them to see it's OK to take action. As a kid, your voice is important. Use it."

== Writing and journalism ==
Svitak's first full-length novel, Yang in Disguise, which she began working on in 2006, was published on March 14, 2011 (ISBN 978-1460979976). She also served as a spokesperson for Verizon Reads campaign for literacy and edited a novella, The Pickpocket Princess. Her second book, Dancing Fingers, which her older sister Adrianna, who is a musician, helped write was published on April 30, 2008 (ISBN 978-1888045567).

=== Other work ===
- Edited Green My Parents: Join the Youth Movement to Seed the Green Economy in 2010.
- Contributed poems to the Redmond Centennial Poetry Anthology in 2012.
- Huffington Post featured blogger for Women, Education, Parenting, and Teen verticals. "Would You Let Your Daughter Wear This?" article received upwards of 2000 comments, becoming one of the most popular articles on the Huffington Post.
- While attending the University of California, Berkeley, she was the Fall 2017 Editor-in-Chief of the Berkeley Political Review.
- Mashable featured blogger.
- Edutopia blogger.
- Adora reported for online news site VICE on the ji6SETI organization, interviewing astronomer and TED Prize winner Jill Tarter and producing the video "The Thankless Search for Intelligence Out There...Somewhere"
- Special columnist for Gulf News; writing a column for parents about the new generation and how interactions with technology would necessarily shape family and social dynamics.
- Gates Foundation Impatient Optimists blogger.
- Women's Media Center blogger.

== Activism ==
Svitak was a Verizon Foundation Literacy Champion from 2005 to 2009. In that capacity, she appeared on behalf of Verizon's foundation alongside James Earl Jones at the National Center for Family Literacy convention in Orlando, Florida and at the ISTE (International Society for Technology in Education) Conference (formerly the National Education Computing Conference). During the summer of 2012 Svitak wrote scripts for, and appeared in, Google's "Teach Teachers Tech" videos, modelled after their "Teach Parents Tech" videos, which promoted digital tools for use in education. Svitak has publicly espoused feminist values in her Girls' State of the Union address at the National Press Club and a 2014 speech at the Orange County Girls' Conference at UC Irvine. An article in Forbes about Svitak was titled "Is this 15-year-old Feminist a New Kind of Gloria Steinem in the Making?". Svitak was quoted in a subsequent Forbes article commenting on the controversy around Sports Illustrated magazine using Barbie as a cover girl; Svitak felt that Barbie "...encourages an unrealistic expectation of beauty grounded in narrow ideals – whiteness, thinness, a lack of hair and an abundance of breast tissue – instead of kindness, smarts, self-confidence, or athleticism".

== Awards and honors ==
In 2011, the National Education Association Foundation awarded Svitak with their Award for Outstanding Service to Public Education. The Huffington Post included her on their "18 under 18 Most Amazing Young People of the Year" list of 2012. In her junior year of high school, Svitak was named a Redmond Rotary Club Student of the Month. Her "Girls' State of the Union" video, submitted to a Women's Media Center contest, took first place; subsequently, she spoke at the National Press Club in Washington, DC. In 2013, Svitak was named a Three Dot Dash Global Teen Leader by the New York City-based We Are Family Foundation for her work organizing TEDxRedmond and raising awareness for the United Nations World Food Programme. As a Global Teen Leader, she participated in a week-long leadership summit in New York City in March 2013.
