= Harvard Political Review =

American student magazine

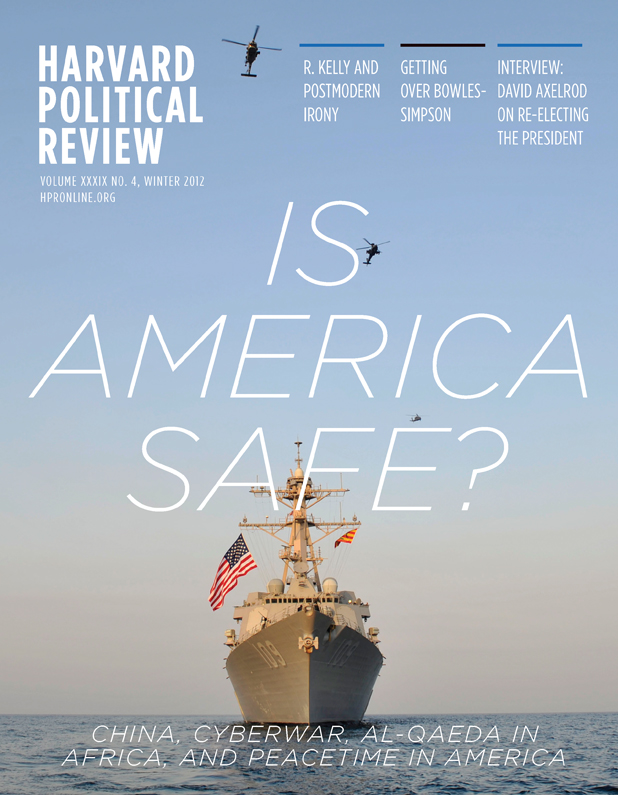
- Winter 2012 issue
- Current President: Donald Cruse
- Categories: Politics, social issues, culture
- Frequency: Quarterly
- Founder: Al Gore
- Founded: 1969
- First issue: April 10, 1969; 57 years ago
- Company: Harvard Institute of Politics
- Based in: Cambridge, Massachusetts, U.S.
- Language: English
- Website: www.theharvardpoliticalreview.com
- ISSN: 0090-1032
- OCLC: 1784689

The Harvard Political Review is a quarterly, nonpartisan American magazine and website on politics and public policy founded in 1969 at Harvard University in Cambridge, Massachusetts. It covers domestic and international affairs and political events and political discourse at Harvard. It also conducts interviews with political figures and experts. It is a publication of the Harvard Institute of Politics, and is written, edited, and managed entirely by undergraduates. It accepts submissions from all students at Harvard College "regardless of concentration, experience, or political leaning," according to its website.

== History ==
=== Founding ===
The magazine was founded in 1969 by a group of Harvard undergraduates, including Al Gore, as a publication that allowed students to research, write, and edit political commentary in a thoughtful, non-partisan forum. To this day, the HPR does not take magazine-wide editorial positions. While individual articles have distinct viewpoints, the magazine as a whole does not represent any ideology or party.

The magazine was formed during the era of student protests in the late 1960s and witnessed several leadership and format changes in its first few years of existence. At times it has had to fight for its editorial independence. In recent years, HPR writers have won the National Press Club Award for Outstanding College Political Writing.

=== Today ===
Currently, the magazine is written, edited, and managed entirely by undergraduates at Harvard. The Harvard Political Review also operates a daily website.

The magazine runs interviews with political figures, along with book reviews, humor pieces, and student opinion articles on domestic and world affairs. Each issue features a number of articles organized around a central theme or topic.

Since the fall of 2010, the magazine has published an annual report on the U.S. federal budget. Its editors have been featured on Fox News and the Huffington Post.

== Notable alumni ==
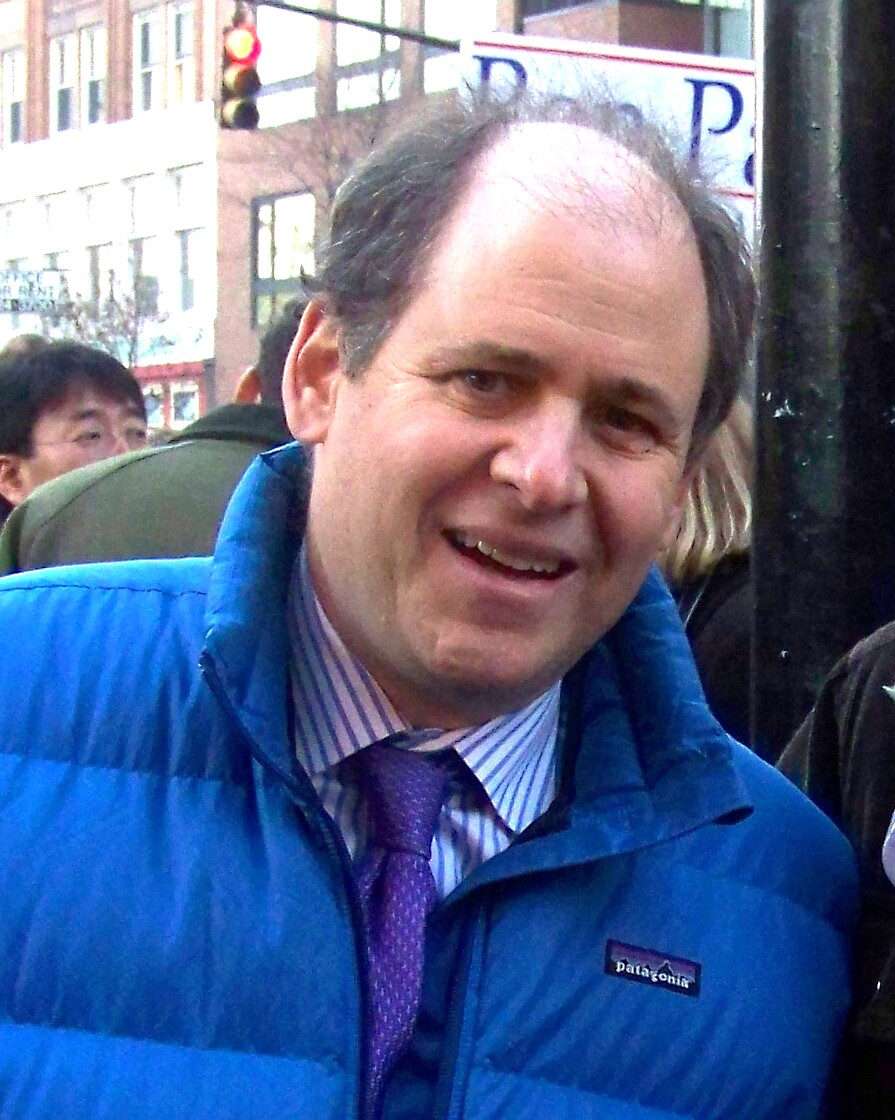
Jonathan Alter, Bloomberg View columnist

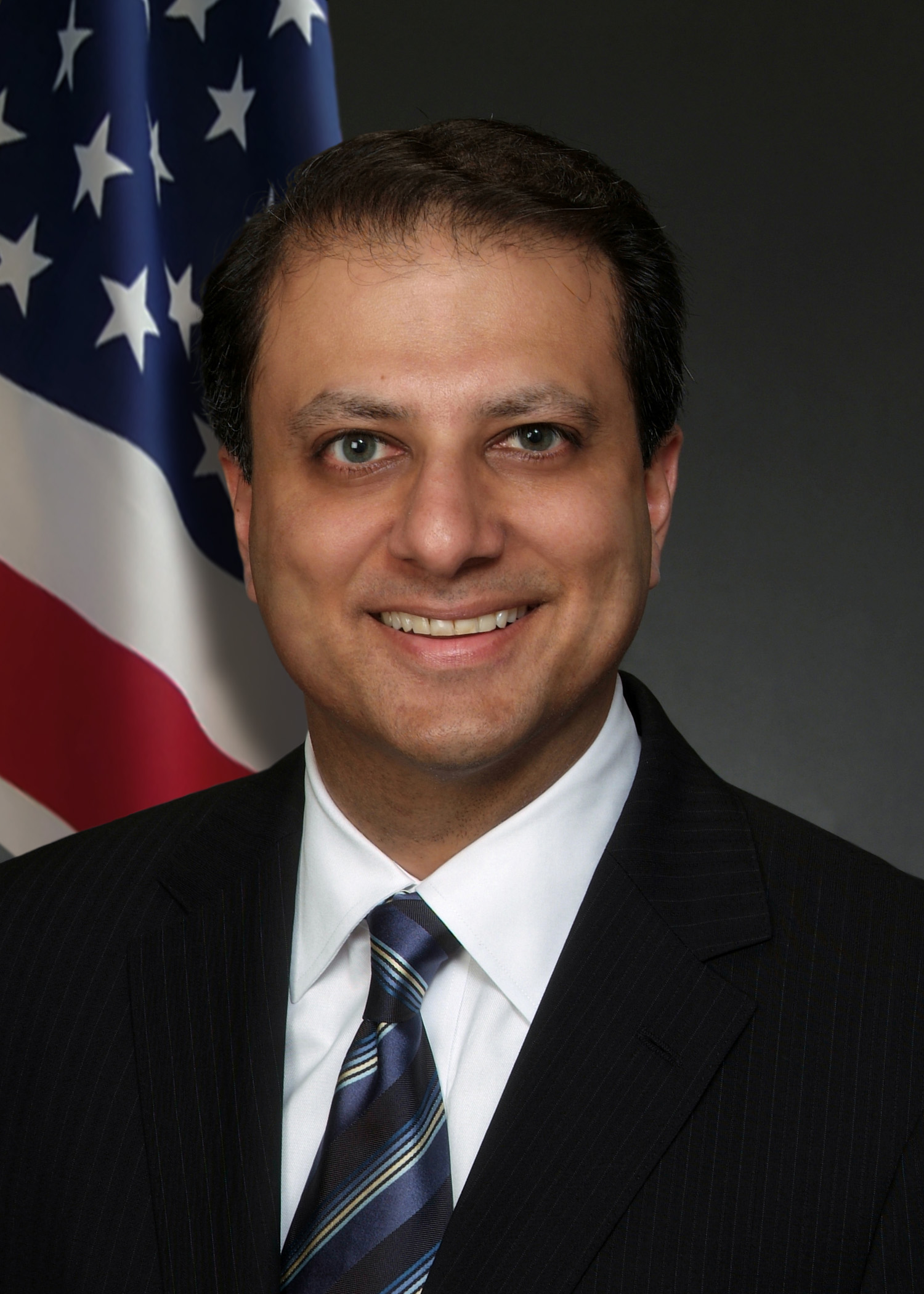
Preet Bharara, United States Attorney for the Southern District of New York

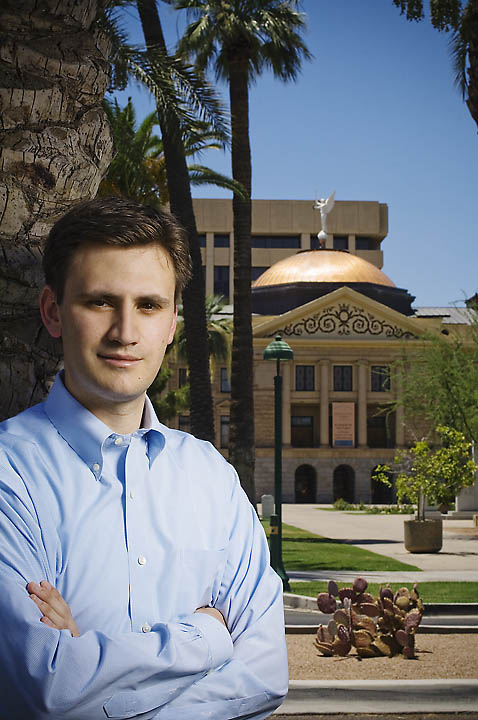
Andrei Cherny, former White House speechwriter

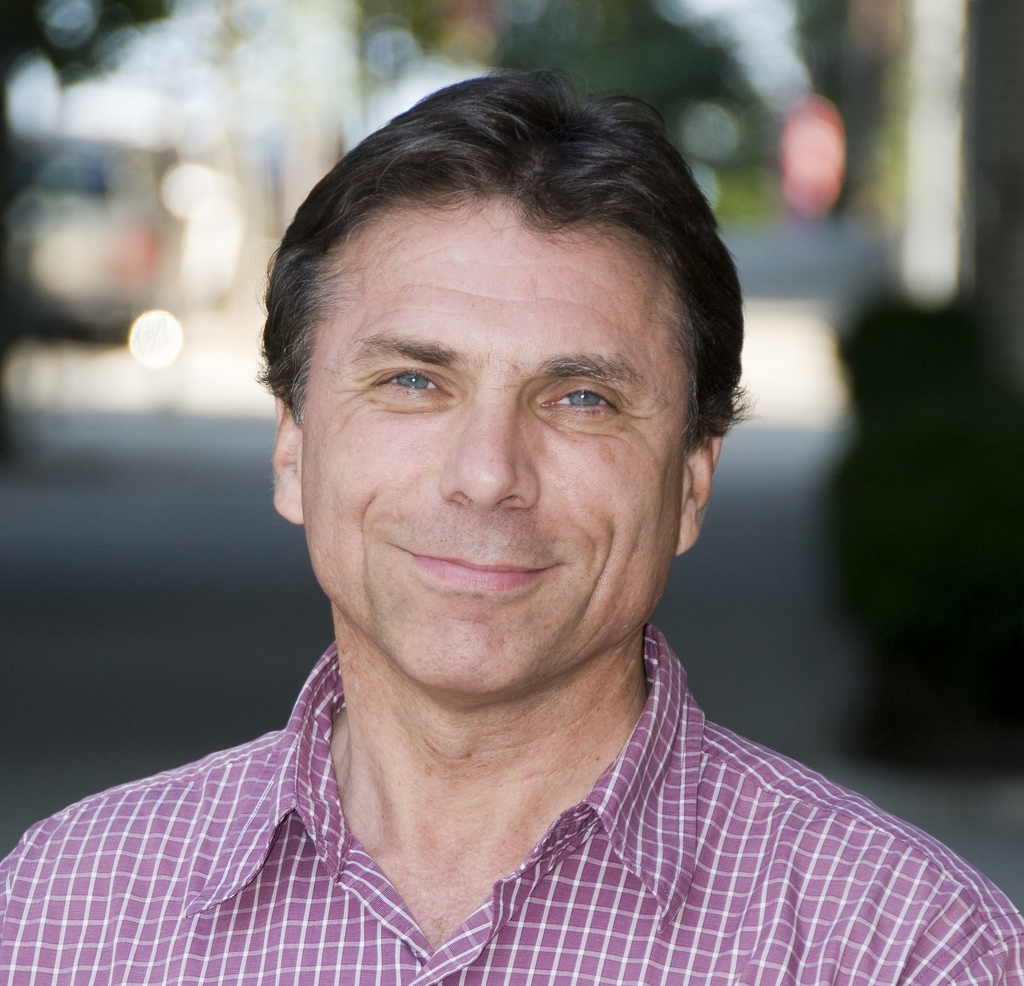
Nelson Antonio Denis, former New York State Assemblyman, author and film director

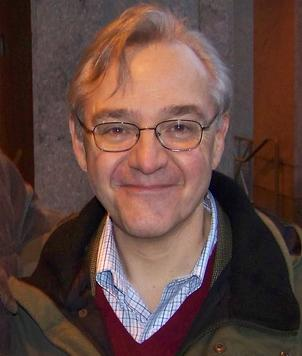
E. J. Dionne, Washington Post columnist

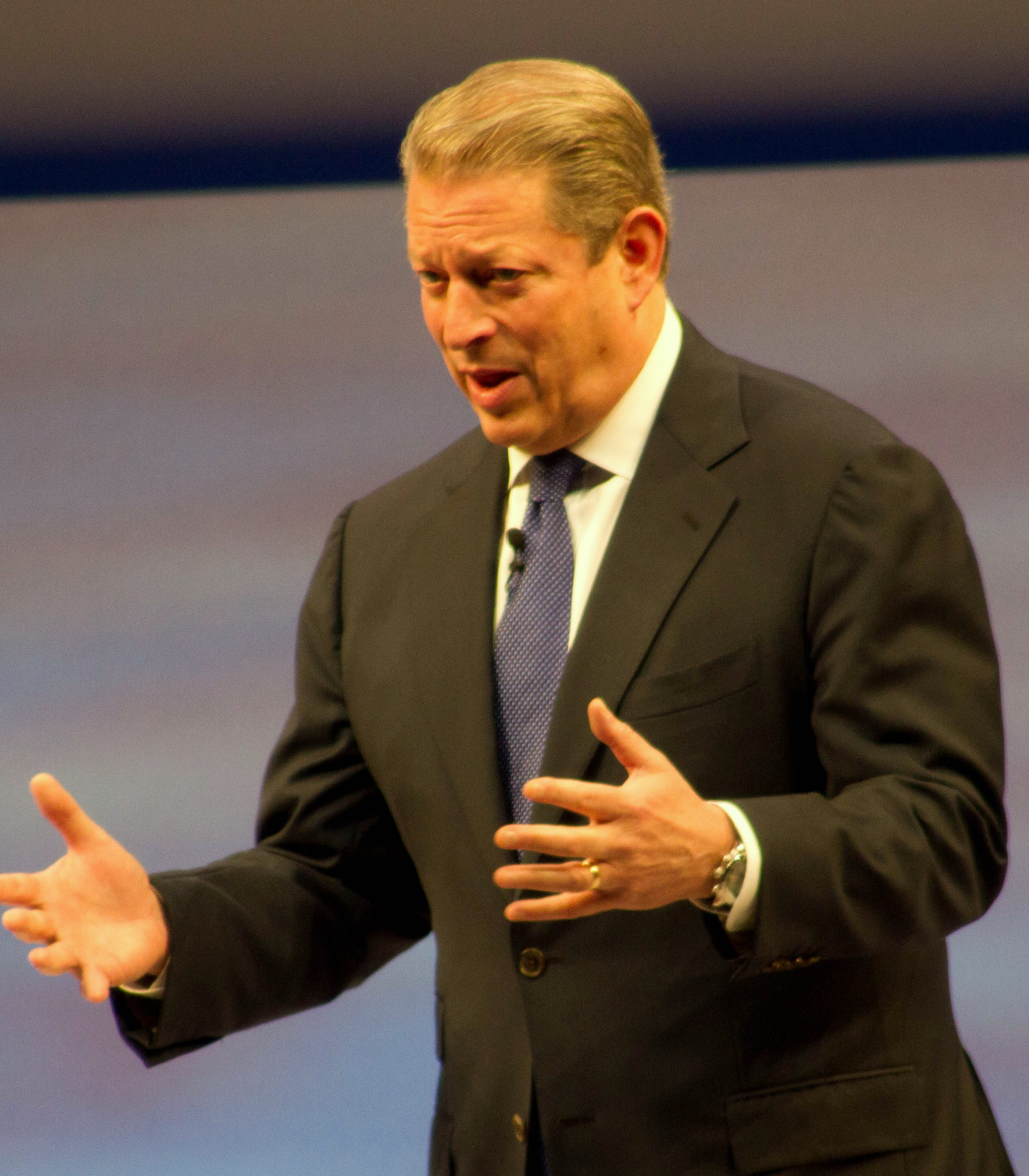
Al Gore, 45th Vice President of the United States, Nobel Peace Prize laureate

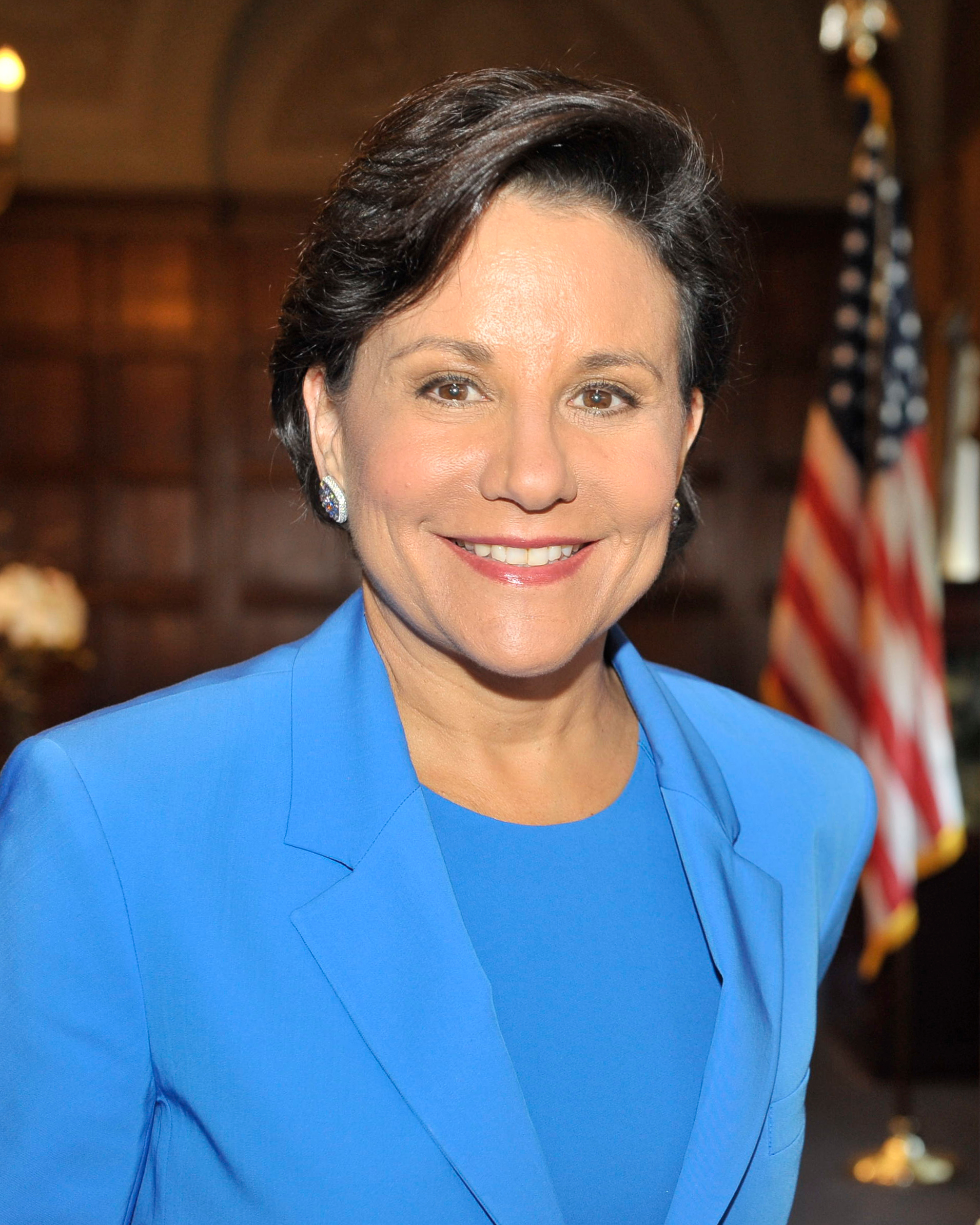
Penny Pritzker, United States Secretary of Commerce

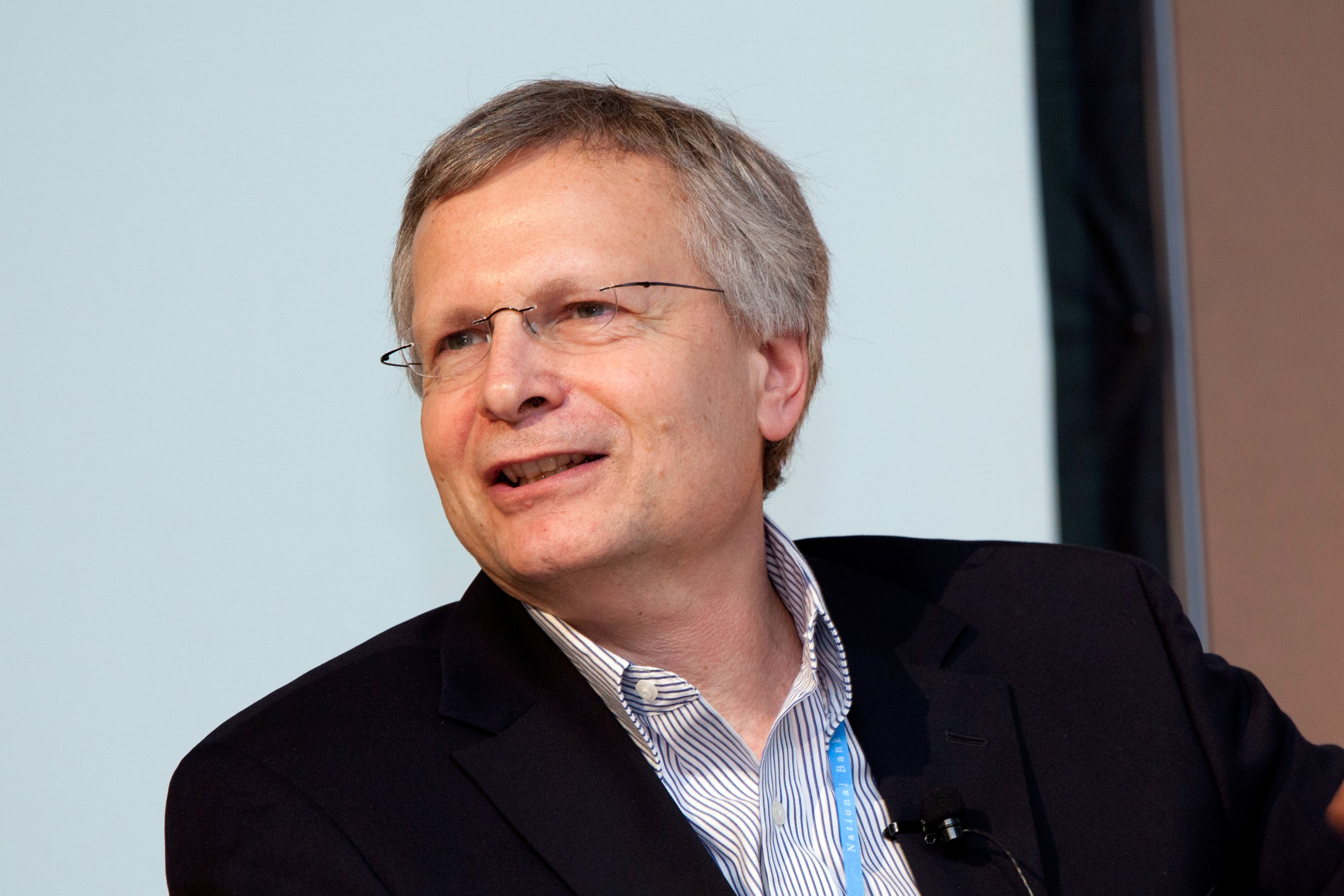
Dani Rodrik, Institute for Advanced Study professor

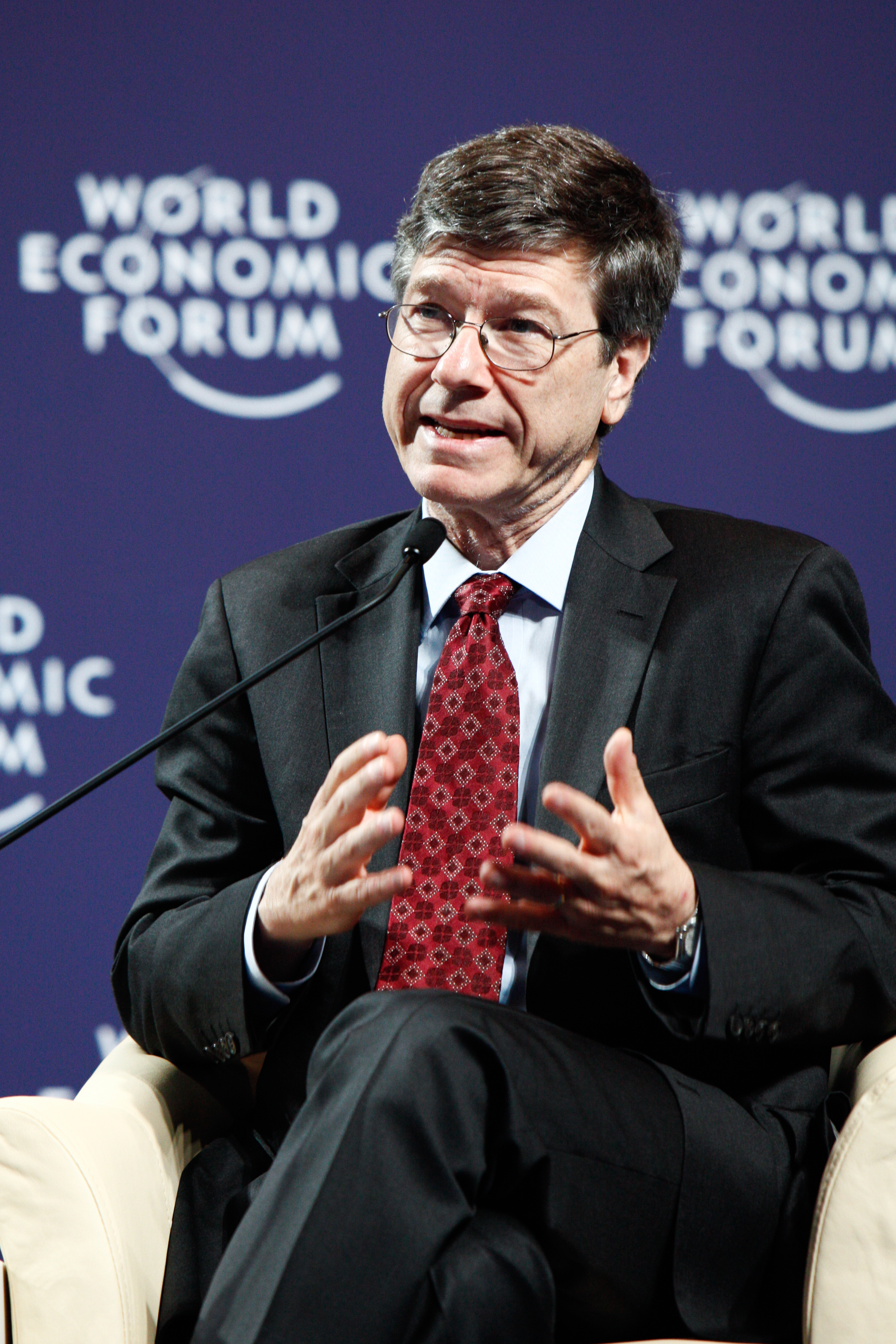
Jeffrey Sachs, Columbia University professor, The Earth Institute director

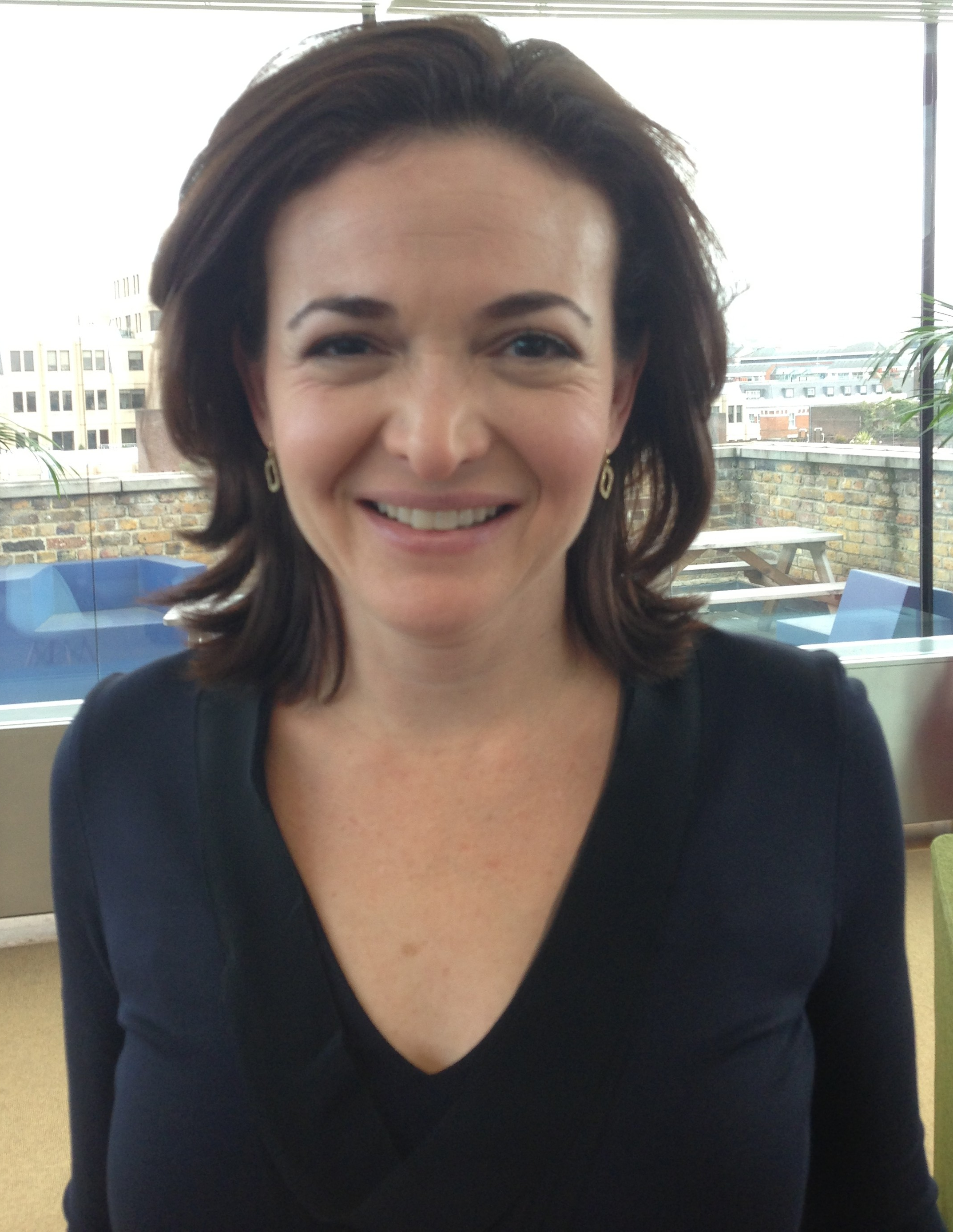
Sheryl Sandberg, COO of Facebook

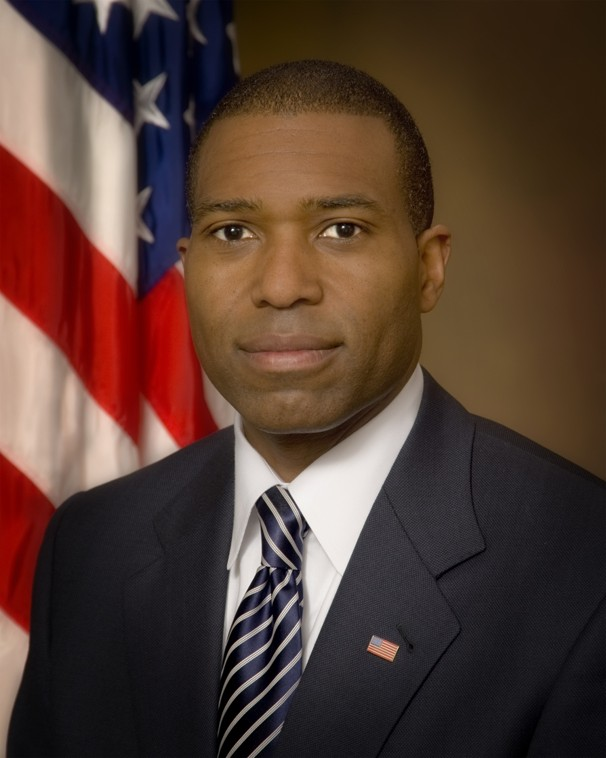
Tony West, United States Associate Attorney General

Other notable HPR alumni include:

- Linda Bilmes, Daniel Patrick Moynihan Senior Lecturer in Public Policy and Public Finance at Harvard University
- Glenn Hutchins, co-founder of Silver Lake Partners
- Lawrence H. White, Economics Professor at George Mason University
- Andrew S. Effron, former Chief Judge of the United States Court of Appeals for the Armed Forces (CAAF)

== See also ==
- Columbia Political Review
- Brown Political Review
- Berkeley Political Review
- The Brown Spectator
- The Stanford Review
