= The Stanford Daily =

Stanford University's student-run newspaper

- The front page of The Stanford Daily on April 29, 2011, announcing the Faculty Senate's vote to invite ROTC back to campus
- Type: Daily student newspaper
- Format: Broadsheet
- Owner: The Stanford Daily Publishing Corporation
- Editor-in-chief: George Porteous
- Founded: 1892
- Headquarters: Lorry I. Lokey Stanford Daily Building; 456 Panama Mall; Stanford, CA 94305; United States
- Circulation: 4,000
- Website: stanforddaily.com

The Stanford Daily is the student-run, independent daily newspaper serving Stanford University. The Daily is distributed throughout campus and the surrounding community of Palo Alto, California, United States. It has published since the university was founded in 1892.

The paper publishes weekdays during the academic year. The Daily also published several special issues every year: "The Orientation Issue", "Big Game Issue", and "The Commencement Issue". In the fall of 2008, the paper's offices relocated from the Storke Publications Building to the newly constructed Lorry I. Lokey Stanford Daily Building, near the recently renovated Old Student Union.

== History ==
The paper began as a small student publication called The Daily Palo Alto serving the Palo Alto area and the university. It "has been Stanford's only news outlet operating continuously since the birth of the University."

In the late 1960s and early 1970s, as baby boomer college students increasingly questioned authority and asserted generational independence, and Stanford administrators became worried about liability for the paper's editorials, the paper and the university severed ties. In 1973, students founded The Stanford Daily Publishing Corporation, a non-profit corporation, to operate the newspaper.

A significant event leading to the paper's independence was the 1970 publication of an opinion piece entitled "Snitches and Oppression." The author of the piece named two witnesses to the protests that led to his arrest and concluded "take care of snitches." The university president, Richard Lyman, called the piece a "journalistic atrocity" and indicated concern that the university could be held liable for the content of the newspaper and its consequences. During the fall of 1970, the newspaper also announced an editorial policy of destroying unpublished photographs of demonstrations so they could not be used as evidence in court.

In April 1971, little more than a year thereafter, the newspaper's policy led Palo Alto Chief of Police, James Zurcher, to initiate a search of the Daily offices. This occurred shortly after the occupation of a Stanford Hospital building had been broken up by police, some of whom were attacked and injured by the demonstrators. Believing that photographs of these assaults existed in Daily files, detectives spent hours searching the darkroom and staff members' desks.

The newspaper, aided by the noted constitutional expert Anthony Amsterdam, filed suit claiming a violation of the First and Fourth Amendments to the Constitution. Zurcher v. Stanford Daily went all the way to the Supreme Court, which ruled against the paper, holding that a state may issue a warrant to search and seize evidence from a third party who is not a criminal suspect (although "particular exactitude" must be exercised when First Amendment considerations are at play). This ruling caused the legislative branch to respond with the Privacy Protection Act of 1980, which increased protections for nonsuspect third parties in legal cases.

In 1991, a volunteer group of alumni incorporated The Friends of The Stanford Daily Foundation to provide support for the newspaper.

In 1982, after the Stanford football team officially lost the Big Game against cross-bay rival University of California at Berkeley ("Cal") due to what has become known as "The Play," The Daily published a fake edition of The Daily Californian, Cal's student newspaper, announcing officials had reversed the game's outcome. Styled as an "extra," the bogus paper headlined "NCAA AWARDS BIG GAME TO STANFORD". The Daily distributed 7,000 copies around the Berkeley campus early in the morning, before that day's Cal student paper was released. The prank has been credited to four Stanford undergraduates: Tony Kelly, Mark Zeigler, Adam Berns and The Daily's editor-in-chief at the time, Richard Klinger. To cover printing costs, The Daily made souvenir copies available on the Stanford campus for $1 apiece.

The Stanford Daily's journalism has sometimes had far-reaching consequences; in the early 1990s a Daily staff member, John Wagner, '91, reported and published an investigative series uncovering significant corruption in the management of the Stanford Bookstore. According to Joanie Fischer's 2003 article about the newspaper in Stanford Magazine, "Managers of the independent nonprofit had formed a consulting firm that then leased a vacation home to the Bookstore and embezzled Bookstore funds to furnish it."

In October 2015, The Daily was criticized for failing to investigate misconduct at both the student and university level by Vanity Fair's David Margolick who wrote "The Stanford Daily has proved supine" in a 7,000-word feature on the unfolding scandal at the Graduate School of Business. When GSB Dean Garth Saloner resigned suddenly on September 14, 2015, amid a wrongful termination suit, The Daily was scooped by Poets & Quants, a blog that covers MBA programs around the world. The lawsuit was filed by a former professor married to fellow GSB professor Deborah H. Gruenfeld, with whom Saloner was having an affair. Though the scandal was covered extensively by The New York Times, The Washington Post, Bloomberg, and several international outlets, The Daily did not do additional reporting beyond its initial announcement of the dean's resignation.

On April 28, 2016, The Daily reported on former Speaker of the House John Boehner's likening of 2016 presidential candidate Ted Cruz to "Lucifer in the flesh" at a campus event. The report was picked up by numerous major outlets, including Politico and The New York Times.

In November 2022, The Daily reported claims of image manipulation in academic publications on which Stanford University President Marc Tessier-Lavigne was a named author. The paper followed up on this reporting the following February with further allegations. Ultimately, Tessier-Levigne announced his resignation after an independent review stated, among other conclusions, that "Dr. Tessier-Lavigne took insufficient steps to correct mistakes", and that he had "overseen labs that had an 'unusual frequency' of data manipulations."

In August 2025, The Daily filed a lawsuit against Secretary of State Marco Rubio and Secretary of Homeland Security Kristi Noem. The lawsuit alleged that the Trump administration was violating students' First Amendment right to free speech due to immigration policy targeting students with pro-Palestinian views for visa-revocation and deportation.

== Notable alumni ==
- Annalee Whitmore Fadiman (1937) — first woman managing editor and co-author of Thunder Out of China
- Lorry I. Lokey (1949) – founder of Business Wire, a news release service that was later bought by Berkshire Hathaway; philanthropist
- Felicity Barringer (1972) – national environmental correspondent for The New York Times
- Doyle McManus (1974) – Los Angeles Times columnist
- Peter Bhatia (1975) – editor of the Detroit Free Press and former president of the American Society of Newspaper Editors
- Stephen L. Carter (1976) – law professor and science fiction writer
- Daniel Pearl (1985) – The Wall Street Journal foreign correspondent who was kidnapped and murdered while reporting from Pakistan in 2002
- Troy Eid (1986) – former United States Attorney for Colorado
- June Cohen (1992) – former executive producer of TED Media
- Joel Stein (1993) – former Los Angeles Times columnist
- Rajiv Chandrasekaran (1994) – Washington Post national Editor
- Nicholas Thompson (1997) – The Atlantic CEO
- Theo Baker – youngest winner of a George Polk Award (2023)

== See also ==
- Stanford Chaparral
- The Stanford Review
- The Fountain Hopper
