= The Rainbow Agenda =

1980s demands of a Stanford University student group

The Rainbow Agenda was a set of demands put forth by a coalition of student groups at Stanford University in the late 1980s. Inspired by Jesse Jackson's Rainbow Coalition (now Rainbow/PUSH), Stanford's Rainbow Coalition demanded that the university "explore the critical concerns of minority students, faculty, and staff at Stanford University".

== History ==
On January 17, 1987, some 500 Stanford students marched with Jesse Jackson to celebrate a new course at Stanford to replace its previous "Western Culture" requirement. In 1988, the Faculty Senate voted to change the course to "Cultures, Ideas, and Values" (CIV).

In response to backlash, a "Rainbow Coalition" was formed, a coalition of student groups which made a number of demands of the university (the Rainbow Agenda). These student groups included the Black Student Union, MEChA, the Asian American Student Association, and the Stanford American Indian Organization. The demands included requests concerning student and faculty diversity, support for community centers, and a "renewed commitment to discourage Indian mascot fanatics."

On 15 May 1989, students from the Rainbow Coalition also occupied President Donald Kennedy's office, to "emphasize the need for an Asian American Studies tenure-track professor; a full-time dean for El Centro Chicano, the Chicano student center; and a discrimination review board to act on complaints of racial slurs and incidents. Fifty-five students... were arrested."

== Impact ==
The Rainbow Coalition was renamed the Students of Color Coalition (SOCC) in 1994. Twenty five years after its founding, In 2012 SOCC was described as possibly one of the most influential student groups in determining the result of student elections.

"Culture, Ideas, and Values" was eventually replaced by IHUM.

The Stanford Review was founded in 1987 partly to provide a conservative counterpoint to issues raised by the Rainbow Coalition.
