= Columbia Political Review =

Columbia University undergraduate magazine

The Columbia Political Review
- Total circulation: 8,000
- Founder: Yoni Appelbaum
- First issue: 2001
- Based in: New York City, New York
- Website: CPReview.org

The Columbia Political Review is Columbia University's undergraduate multipartisan political magazine. The Columbia Political Review is the official publication of the Columbia Political Union, the largest political organization on campus. The Columbia Political Review features articles on domestic and international issues, and interviews with political leaders and academics. It is published four times per academic year, with a Fall, Winter, Spring and Summer issue.

== Founding ==
The Columbia Political Review was created in 2001 by leaders of the Columbia Political Union, including its general manager, Yoni Appelbaum, and its publisher, Jaime Sneider. The first managing editor was Adam B. Kushner. The early magazine featured book reviews, personal essays, opinion pieces, in-depth analysis and interviews with an influential figure. It sought to foster political discussion on campus and become a platform for diverse opinion. It was published two to three times a semester. The Columbia Political Review saw its largest period of growth between 2001 and 2007, when circulation grew to 4,500.

== Alumni ==
- Yoni Appelbaum, politics editor of The Atlantic
- Chris Beam, founder IvyGate
- Matthew Continetti, editor of The Washington Free Beacon
- Adam B. Kushner, editor of the Outlook section of The Washington Post
- Rob Saliterman, former spokesman for former president George W. Bush
- Paul Sonne, Moscow correspondent The Wall Street Journal
- Marc Tracy, sports reporter for The New York Times

== See also ==
- The Brown Spectator
- Brown Political Review
- The Stanford Review
- Berkeley Political Review
- Harvard Political Review
