= Berkeley Political Review =

Political magazine and website

- Spring 2018 issue
- Categories: Politics, social issues, culture
- Frequency: 2 per year
- Founded: 2001
- Country: United States
- Based in: Berkeley, California
- Language: English
- Website: berkeleypoliticalreview.org

The Berkeley Political Review is a semesterly, nonpartisan political magazine and website published by the students of University of California, Berkeley. It was founded shortly after September 11th, 2001. Through printed publications and multimedia projects, the Review covers international and domestic political affairs. Submissions are limited; to write for, edit, or otherwise staff the magazine, undergraduate students must apply at the beginning of each semester.

The Berkeley Political Review is notable for being the first journal based out of a public university to join the Alliance of Collegiate Editors, whose members include political reviews at Brown, Harvard, Stanford, and Columbia, among others. Members of the Review have also hosted or co-hosted a number of debates, interviews, and panels.

== Editorial Board ==
The Editorial Board for the 2026 to 2027 academic year is:

- Editors-in-Chief: Caspar Turner and Molly Urfalian
- Managing California Editor: Amanda McLeod
- Deputy California Editors: Damien Winkler, Madeleine Kashkooli, and Matthew Pitcher
- Managing United States Editor: Monica Sidana
- Deputy United States Editors: Faith Spalding, Tvisha Joshi, and Liren Wang
- Managing World Editors: Nicholas Carone, Ava Reyes and Ella Johnson
- Deputy World Editors: Makena Tom and Varun Venkatesh
- Managing Opinion Editor: Will Baker
- Deputy Opinion Editors: Merjan Khwajazada and Elliot Harvey
- Managing Multimedia Editor: Isabelle Jacobson
- Deputy Multimedia Editor: Helios Lung
- Managing Copy Editor: Katherine Buckman
- Deputy Copy Editor: Kathleen Yu
- Director of Layout: Grace Vierra
- Director of Creative Outreach: Zara Gervais

== Notable alumni ==
- Shane Goldmacher (editor), national political reporter for The New York Times; former chief White House correspondent for Politico.
- Christine Mai-Duc (editor), reporter for The Wall Street Journal; former staff writer for the Los Angeles Times.
- Adora Svitak (editor-in-chief), former child prodigy, journalist, author, public speaker, and activist.

== See also ==
- The Daily Californian
- The Brown Spectator
- The Stanford Review
- Brown Political Review
- Columbia Political Review
- Harvard Political Review
- Berkeley Forum
