= Stanford Daily Publishing Corporation v. Rubio =

Lawsuit in the United States

Stanford Daily Publishing Corporation et al. v. Rubio et al.
- Court: United States District Court for the Northern District of California
- Started: August 6, 2025
- Decided: August 28, 2026

Court membership
- Judge sitting: Noël Wise

Stanford Daily Publishing Corporation et al. v. Rubio et. al. was a 2025 to 2026 federal lawsuit brought by the publishing company of The Stanford Daily, a student newspaper at Stanford University, against the federal government. The suit alleged the Trump Administration's immigration policies targeting pro-Palestinian speech violated the first amendment rights of international students, limiting their participation in the Daily.

The Cato Institute, along with the National Coalition Against Censorship and The Rutherford Institute, filed an amicus brief in support of the students.

On August 28, 2026, judge Noël Wise of the US District Court for the Northern District of California ruled the federal government's authority on national security and foreign policy is still "constrained by First Amendment rights", writing that efforts to deport international students based on speech is unconstitutional.
