= Political Theory Project =

Think tank at Brown University

- Established: 2003; 23 years ago
- Director: John Tomasi
- Location: 25 George Street, Brown University
- Publications: Brown Political Review

The Political Theory Project (PTP) was an interdisciplinary research center at Brown University in Providence, Rhode Island. The center has since transitioned into the university's Center for Philosophy, Politics and Economics.

The center's stated mission was to "investigate the ideas and institutions that make societies free, prosperous, and fair." From its establishment in 2003 until 2021, the Project was directed by founder John Tomasi. According to Tomasi, the PTP focuses "on the interplay of democratic and market-based ideals, with a commitment to examining issues from a variety of ideological perspectives." The Project is officially nonpartisan and maintains that it is not committed "to any particular ideological orientation."

== History ==
At inception, the Political Theory Project originally focused on offering post-doctoral researchers to pursue scholarship regarding political theory. The center grew to encompass a wider range of programing, including seminars and lecture series. Among these is the Janus Forum Lecture Series which featured speakers of contrasting viewpoints. Established in 2007, the lecture series hosted Noam Chomsky, Steven Pinker, Paul Krugman, Jeffrey Sachs, and Glenn Greenwald, among others.

Two student publications, the Brown Political Review and Brown Journal of Philosophy, Politics and Economics were sponsored by the Political Theory Project.

== People ==
- John Tomasi, founder and director
- Jason Brennan, postdoctoral associate (2006–2008), author of Against Democracy

=== Faculty associates ===
- David Estlund, professor, philosophy
- Glenn Loury, professor, economics
- Mark C. Suchman, professor, sociology
- Ashutosh Varshney, professor, international studies and political science
