= The Stanford Review =

Student-run newspaper in California

- Type: Student newspaper
- Owner(s): The Stanford Review, non-profit corporation
- Founder(s): Peter Thiel; Norman Book
- Editor-in-chief: Elsa Johnson (2026)
- Founded: 1987; 39 years ago
- Headquarters: Stanford University
- Price: Free of charge to students
- ISSN: 0092-0258
- Website: stanfordreview.org

The Stanford Review (also known as The Review) is a conservative student-run newspaper that serves Stanford University in Stanford, California. It was founded in 1987 by Peter Thiel and Norman Book.

== History ==
In 1987, after around 500 students participated in a march led by Jesse Jackson's Rainbow Coalition, the students were inspired to put forth the Rainbow Agenda, a list of the concerns that the minority students wanted the institution to address. The Stanford Review was founded to provide an "alternative viewpoint" to that expressed in the Agenda, by the "vocal few" as they were referred to in the publication's first issue, dated June 9, 1987, in an article titled "Stanford Review is here to stay." The founders felt that views being expressed were inconsistent with views held by majority of the student body. It aspired to be a place where "rational debate" could exist at the university.

In 1995, the paper prevailed in a free-speech lawsuit against the university's speech code. The court ruled that the code which banned insults that were racially and/or gender-motivated was unconstitutional. In a 2016 letter to the editor of The Stanford Daily, the managing editor wrote that "the entire purpose of The Review is to publish unpopular views." The letter also clarified that although the newspaper serves as an outlet for writers, whether they are a staff writer or otherwise, The Review itself may or may not have a position on the subject matter.

Incorporated in 1990 as nonprofit 501(c)(3), as of 2017, a large portion of the publication's revenue was generated by fundraising efforts and alumni donors. While Thiel also has made financial contributions, he has hosted staff reunions at his home, and meets with the editors quarterly as a way to stay current with campus activities in general.

In 2024, the Review accused Stanford math education professor Jo Boaler of "shoddy research" and de-tracking students with a "dumbed-down math curriculum" of "woke math" and harassing scholars who take issue with her.

== Notable former editors and staff ==
- Peter Thiel (graduated 1989, founding editor-in-chief from 1987–1989), co-founder of PayPal, Founders Fund, Palantir Technologies
- Jay Bhattacharya (graduated 1990, former business manager and news editor), professor of medicine, economics, and health research policy at Stanford University and 18th director of the National Institutes of Health.
- Paula M. Stannard (graduated 1990, assistant editor), Director of the Office for Civil Rights at U.S. Department of Health and Human Services.
- Norman Book (graduated 1991, co-founder and managing editor): he has been a friend of Thiel since high school. Book was an early PayPal employee, then became a co-founder of publishing house World Ahead Media and executive VP at WorldNetDaily, and later moved to Palo Alto Networks. He has also been president of the alumni board of director of the Review. Paolo Perulli describes Book as "a Thielist of the first hour".
- Keith Rabois (graduated 1991, former opinion editor), chief operating officer of Square, investor at Khosla Ventures (Rabois, like Book, Bhattacharya and Stannard, were editors and writers for the Review under Thiel).
- Kevin Warsh (graduated 1992, former writer), former member of the Federal Reserve Board of Governors (2006–2011), nominated by President Donald Trump in January 2026 to serve as Chair of the Federal Reserve.
- Nathan Linn (graduated 1993, former editor-in-chief), former CFO at Valar Ventures, former VP of finance at Clarium Capital, partner and COO at Level Equity Management.
- David O. Sacks (graduated 1994, former editor-in-chief), co-founder of Yammer, angel investor; White House AI and Crypto Czar, Co-Chair of the President's Council of Advisors on Science and Technology (both since January 2025).
- Ryan Bounds (graduated 1995, former opinion editor), Assistant United States Attorney for the District of Oregon and failed nominee to the United States Court of Appeals for the Ninth Circuit
- Adam Ross (graduated 1995, former editor-in-chief), former board member at Palantir Technologies, founding partner at Goldcrest Capital.
- Aman Verjee (graduated 1996, former editor-in-chief), co-founder and partner at Practical Venture Capital.
- Stephen Russell (graduated 1996, former section editor), founder of Prism Skylabs, early investor in Uber.
- Lucas Mast (graduated 1996, former editor), co-founder of the magazine American Thunder.
- Jeff Giesea (graduated 1997, former editor-in-chief), political activist and writer, co-organizer of MAGA3X, the organization behind DeploraBall.
- Ken Howery (graduated 1998, former editor-in-chief), co-founder of PayPal, Founders Fund; United States Ambassador to Sweden (2019-2021).
- Candice Jackson (graduated 1998, former news editor), Assistant Secretary of Education for Civil Rights under Secretary Betsy DeVos
- Eric Jackson (graduated 1998, former editor-in-chief), co-founder of World Ahead Media, chief executive officer of CapLinked
- Gideon Yu (graduated 1998, former business manager), co-owner and former president of the San Francisco 49ers, former chief financial officer of YouTube and Facebook
- Premal Shah (graduated 1998, former staff), member of the PayPal Mafia, co-founder of Kiva.
- Kevin Harrington (graduated in 1990s, former staff), former managing director of Thiel Macro LLC, current senior director for strategic planning at the U.S. National Security Council.
- Josh Hawley (graduated 2002, former writer), United States senator representing the state of Missouri
- Bob McGrew (graduated 2002, former editor-in-chief), former PayPal engineer, former director of engineering at Palantir, former chief research officer at OpenAI.
- Joe Lonsdale (graduated 2003, former editor-in-chief from 2002–2003), co-founder of Palantir Technologies
- Stephen Cohen (graduated 2005, former editor-in-chief), co-founder of Palantir Technologies
- Alex Moore (graduated 2005, former Review affiliate), Palantir's first employee and board member; partner at former Eight Partners LLC.
- Tristan Abbey (graduated 2008, former editor-at-large), former Clarium Capital and Founders Fund employee, currently 11th administrator of the U.S. Energy Information Administration.
- Tayler Cox, now Tayler Lonsdale (graduated 2009, former executive editor), wife of Joe Lonsdale, former Palantir employee, co-founder of the conservative think-tank Cicero Institute. She is also the secretary and treasurer of the board of United States Common Sense (USCS), a policy organization that advocates for government transparency.
- Jeremy England (Ph.D. 2009, former writer), physicist and Orthodox rabbi.
- Autumn Carter (graduated 2011, former editor-in-chief), executive director of the non-partisan think tank California Common Sense.
- Lisa Wallace (graduated 2013, former editor-in-chief), former Palantir employee, co-founder and co-CEO of the compensation management platform startup Assemble, later acquired by Deel.
- Anthony Ghosn (graduated 2015, former editor-in-chief), Carlos Ghosn's son, former Formation 8 and 8VC employee, co-founder of Shogun Investments.
- Harry Elliott (graduated 2018, former editor-in-chief), partner at General Catalyst.
- Maxwell Meyer (graduated 2022, former editor-in-chief), founding editor-in-chief and publisher of the Arena magazine.
- Mimi St Johns (2024 dropout, former editor-in-chief), former Thiel Capital intern, founder of the crypto startup Verbum Labs.
- Bruce Gibney (former editor-in-chief), former Clarium Capital employee and partner at Founders Fund, author. He was also Howery's roommate at Stanford and an early investor in Confinity.
- Theodore Gillibrand (graduated 2026, writer): founder of derivatives exchange startup American Perpetuals Exchange Corp.(APEC). The month he graduated (June 2026), his company raised $30 million in a funding round led by Lux Capital. In 2025, he wrote an article for the Review, urging Trump to sign the GENIUS Act, a bill that is aimed at regulating stablecoins and was introduced by his mother, the senator Kirsten Gillibrand, among others. The investment as well as the connections and political circumstance surrounding it have been under scrutiny from watchdogs like Campaign Legal Center and the Revolving Door Project.

== Books written by former editors ==
Notable books written by its former editors include:

- The PayPal Wars by Eric M. Jackson
- Their Lives: The Women Targeted by the Clinton Machine by Candice Jackson
- The Diversity Myth: Multiculturalism and the Politics of Intolerance at Stanford by Peter Thiel and David O. Sacks
- Zero to One by Peter Thiel and Blake Masters

== See also ==
- Berkeley Political Review
- The Brown Spectator
- Collegiate Network
- Columbia Political Review
- The Cornell Review
- The Dartmouth Review
- Harvard Political Review
- The Princeton Tory
- The Fountain Hopper
