= American Thunder (magazine) =

American motorsports magazine

American Thunder was among the first independently produced mass-market print magazine devoted to NASCAR racing. The magazine was in circulation between March 2004 and October 2004. The headquarters were in San Francisco.

The magazine was created by Lucas Mast in 2004 and had the initial backing of Peter Thiel, who had recently reaped a windfall from the sale of the online payments company PayPal to its rival, eBay. Thiel and Mast, both Stanford graduates, knew each other through The Stanford Review, which Mast wrote for and Thiel had founded years earlier.

The two saw an opportunity to tap the growing and underserved market of NASCAR fans. American Thunder quickly gained 185,000 subscribers, but shuttered soon thereafter as its funding dried up.
