= Stanford Chaparral =

Stanford University student humor magazine

The Stanford Chaparral
- The first Chappie (October 5, 1899)
- Categories: Humor magazine
- Founder: Bristow Adams & Larrey Bowman
- Founded: 1899, Stanford University
- First issue: October 5, 1899
- Based in: Stanford, California
- Language: English
- Website: stanfordchaparral.com

A Chappie from 1947

The Stanford Chaparral (also known as the Chappie) is a humor magazine published by students of Stanford University since 1899.

== History ==
The Stanford Chaparral was established in 1899 by Bristow Adams and Larrey Bowman. Published for more than 124 years, the Chappie is the third oldest continually published humor magazine in the world after Nebelspalter (1875–present) and the Harvard Lampoon (1876–present). The magazine's most recent brush with the national media was its feature in The New Yorker by Evan Ratliff.

== Traditions ==
The Chappie is published six times during the academic year, or twice per quarter. There are a number of traditional issues, such as the Freshman Number published at the beginning of the school year, and the Big Game Number published on the week of the longstanding football matchup between Stanford and The University of California, Berkeley. In the early Spring, the Chaparral traditionally publishes an annual satire of The Stanford Daily, popularly termed the "Fake Daily."

During the annual elections for student government, two of the magazine's writers traditionally run for president and vice-president of the student body. Despite running as a joke, candidates have won the executive race in the past.

== Chaparral alumni ==
In addition to Adams, the magazine has a number of prominent alumni, including cartoonist Chris Onstad, creator of the webcomic Achewood, The Simpsons executive producer Josh Weinstein, National Medal of Science recipient Bradley Efron, Louis Padulo, President of the University of Alabama in Huntsville, novelist Trey Ellis, author and attorney Daniel Olivas, Bruce Handy, editor of Vanity Fair and Spy Magazine, Goodwin Knight, governor of California, comedian Doodles Weaver, legendary Disney animators Frank Thomas and Ollie Johnston, Disney writer/director/producer James Algar, actor Frank Cady (Sam Drucker on Green Acres) and nerdcore rapper MC Lars (Andrew Nielsen).

== Old "Boys" ==
The magazine's editor-in-chief is termed the "Old Boy," a tradition reaching back to the earliest Chappie numbers. The Old Boys in recent years are as follows:

- 2026-present: Josephine Moreland and Mason Barrett
- 2025-2026: Josephine Moreland and Mason Barrett
- 2024-2025: Lynn Collardin and Sachin Singh
- 2023–2024: Aadya Joshi and Dominic Borg
- 2022–2023: Blake Hord
- 2021–2022: Nicholas Midler
- 2020–2021: Nicholas Midler
- 2019–2020: Pete Tellouche
- 2018–2019: Samantha Kargilis and Scott Mutchnik
- 2017–2018: Samantha Kargilis and Scott Mutchnik
- 2016–2017: Scott Mutchnik and Tristan Navarro
- 2015–2016: "Mama Cosmos" Cassidy Elwood and Mason Stricklin
- 2014–2015: R. Garrett Taylor and "Mama Cass" Cassidy Elwood
- 2013–2014: Michael Ryan De Taboada and Anthony Veasna So
- 2012–2013: Kian V. Ameli
- 2011–2012: Samuel Coggeshall and Alex Hertz
- 2010–2011: William Kemper and Josh Meisel
- 2009–2010: John Lyman and Garrett Werner
- 2008–2009: Meghan McCurdy and Patrick Maher
- 2007–2008: Anthony Scodary and Josh Stark
- 2006–2007: Douglas Kenter and Allan Phillips
- 2005–2006: Rishi Chanderraj and Carrie Kemper
- 2004–2005: Matthew Henick and Charlie Stockman
- 2003–2004: Ian Spiro and Steve Yelderman

== See also ==
- The Stanford Flipside
- Will Irwin
- The Stanford Daily
