= The Brown Spectator =

Rhode Island student newspaper

- Type: Newspaper
- Publisher: Alex Shieh
- Editor-in-chief: Benjamin Marcus
- Managing editor: Gray Bittker
- Founded: 1984
- Headquarters: Providence, Rhode Island
- Circulation: 2,000
- Website: brownspectator.com

The Brown Spectator is a newspaper of conservative and libertarian political writing published by students at Brown University. It was originally the product of a student independent project and first published in 1984 "as a two-page offering of student writing on brightly colored paper".

It was revived in 1986 as a Brown University, student-run opinion journal that published articles of both national and campus concern that other publications ignored. It was produced by Jennifer Polli and Karen Engel, and described itself as "alternative journal" of conservative thought.

After disappearing for some time, The Brown Spectator was re-revived by Stephen Beale during the 2002–2003 school year and functioned as Brown University's only journal of conservative and libertarian thought. The Brown Spectator ran with a wide array of political and non-political topics ranging from campus issues to national issues, as well as music reviews and political cartoons but ceased publishing again in 2014.

In 2025 the Spectator was re-founded by Alex Shieh, Benjamin Marcus, and Gray Bittker. In March 2025, Shieh had, on behalf of the soon-to-be revived Spectator, emailed over three thousand university administrators asking them to describe their job functions for an article about administrative costs, the rising cost of tuition, and DEI programs the Trump Administration alleged were illegal. Many noted similarities between Shieh's email and a similar email sent to federal employees by Elon Musk, the de facto head of the Department of Government Efficiency. In response, Brown University launched disciplinary proceedings against Shieh, which some criticized as violations of the freedom of the press. Brown stated that the issue was not related to free speech, while Shieh said the charges were retaliatory. The Foundation for Individual Rights and Expression called the disciplinary charges "nonsensical" and Musk called them "unreal". Congressman Troy Nehls wrote an open letter to university president Christina Paxson condemning the charges against Shieh.

Soon after the publication of Shieh's Bloat@Brown project, Karim Zohdy, a writer for The Spectator, published, also in The Spectator, an article sharply critical of Shieh and his methods.

In May 2025, Fox News reported that Kirsten Wolfe, a university administrator, had launched disciplinary charges against the entire board of directors of The Brown Spectator for allegedly violating Brown's trademark policy, for including the word "Brown" in the paper's name. The Spectator's editors argued they were protected by the doctrine of descriptive fair use, and questioned why Wolfe hadn't also charged The Brown Daily Herald. In response to the charge, Shieh ran a 30-second commercial in the Providence market criticizing Wolfe by name and accusing her of retaliation. Shieh won his disciplinary hearing, was found not responsible for the charges against him, and faced no punishment. In June, Shieh testified before the House Judiciary Subcommittee on the Administrative State, Regulatory Reform, and Antitrust; subsequently House Judiciary Committee chairman Jim Jordan demanded Brown release all internal memos pertaining to the disciplinary investigation into Shieh and The Brown Spectator and issued a subpoena for documents related to Brown's tuition pricing.

In September 2025, the university announced it was eliminating over 100 administrative jobs and positions to address the school's persistent budget shortfall. Shieh said the layoffs proved "the message of Bloat@Brown has been true all along: many of these administrators were unnecessary in the first place."

== See also ==
- The Brown Daily Herald
- The Stanford Review
- The Dartmouth Review
- The Cornell Review
- Berkeley Political Review
- Columbia Political Review
- Harvard Political Review
