= Prism Skylabs =

Video analysis company in California, US

Prism Skylabs is a technology company headquartered in San Francisco, California. Using machine learning, Prism Skylabs provides analysis of businesses' CCTV video.

== History ==
Prism Skylabs was founded by Steve Russell and Ron Palmeri in July 2011. It launched as a company in 2011 at the TechCrunch Disrupt event, where it was featured as a finalist in the Startup Battlefield competition. Its investors include Andreessen Horowitz, Anthem Venture Partners, CrunchFund, Data Collective, Expa, Intel Capital, Pacific Partners, Presidio Ventures, Promus, SV Angel, Tomorrow Ventures and Triangle Peak Partners. The company secured $7.5 million in Series A funding in 2011 and an additional $15 million in Series B funding in October 2013. As of 2014, the company has about 30 employees.

== Product ==
Prism Skylabs' retail web application is cloud-based software that connects to a retailer's existing video surveillance cameras. The software compresses the video data and sends it to cloud servers, where it is analyzed by Prism Skylabs' video analytics technology. The company sends the analyzed data back to the retailer in the form of statistics and visualizations. To address privacy concerns, the software blurs or completely deletes images of people and replaces them with graphical elements.

Prism launched a mobile application in 2016, Vision, which allows users to search for the presence of specific objects and content within video using tags powered by neural networks.

Through Prism Skylabs, firms may be able to analyze long-term trends, such as number of customers, check-out queue lengths, foot traffic patterns, dwell time, and the most popular products in a store. Retailers use this information to improve merchandising, store layout, customer service efforts, and operational efficiencies.
