= List of presidents of Pennsylvania State University =

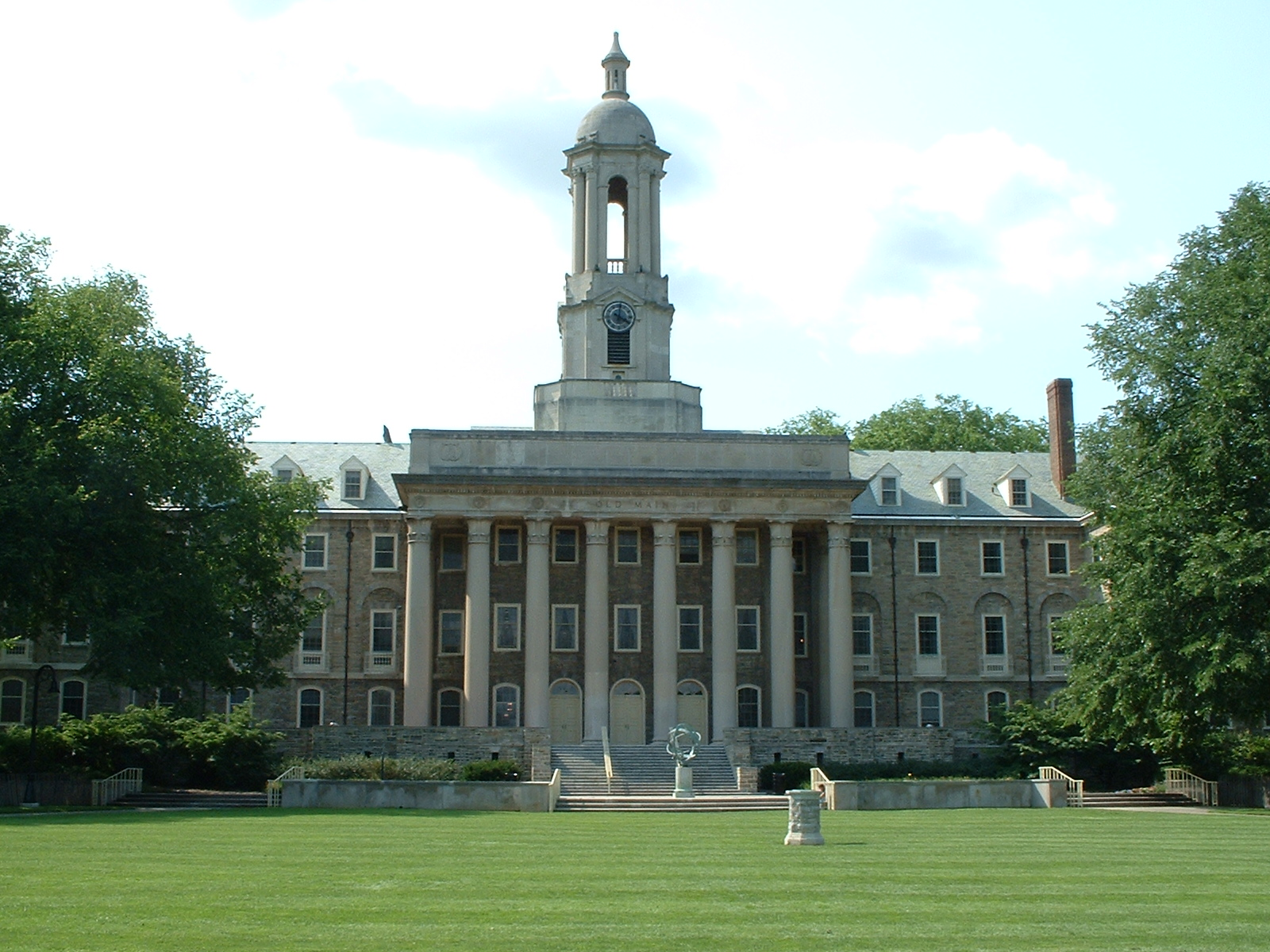
Old Main at Penn State, the administrative center of the university, contains the Office of the President.

The President of the Pennsylvania State University is the chief administrator of the Pennsylvania State University, serving as chief executive officer of the institution and an ex officio member of the 32-member Penn State Board of Trustees. Included in the list below are all Presidents of the Pennsylvania State University and its precursor institutions, from the first President Evan Pugh and through the current President, Neeli Bendapudi. There have been 19 Presidents of the Pennsylvania State University, not including three interregnum presidencies during university presidential transitions.

Pennsylvania's only land-grant university, the Pennsylvania State University was established in 1855 as the Farmers' High School of Pennsylvania, before becoming the Agricultural College of Pennsylvania in 1863 under University President Evan Pugh, the Pennsylvania State College under James Calder in 1874 and, finally, the Pennsylvania State University under Milton S. Eisenhower in 1953. Today, the university is part of the Commonwealth System of Higher Education and is one of the largest universities in the United States.

== List of presidents ==
The following persons have served as president of Pennsylvania State University:

No.	President	Term start	Term end	Ref.
President of Farmer's High School of Pennsylvania (1855–1862)
1	Evan Pugh (Note: In the shadow of the Civil War, Evan Pugh became the first president of the then Farmers' High School. On May 2, 1862 Pugh had the name Farmers' High School changed to the Agricultural College of Pennsylvania.) (1828–1864)	1859	April 29, 1864 (Note: Died in office.)	
Presidents of Agricultural College of Pennsylvania (1862–1874)
2	William Henry Allen (1808–1882)	1864	1866	
3	John Fraser (c. 1823–1878)	1866	1868	
4	Thomas Henry Burrowes (1805–1871)	1868	February 25, 1871	
Presidents of Pennsylvania State College (1874–1953)
5	James Calder (1826–1893)	1871	1880	
6	Joseph Shortlidge (1832–1911)	1880	1881	
acting	James Y. McKee (1836–1891)	1881	1882	
7	George W. Atherton (Note: Often called the "second founder" of the university.) (1837–1906)	1882	July 24, 1906	
acting	James A. Beaver (1837–1914)	1906	1908	
8	Edwin Erle Sparks (1860–1924)	1908	1920	
9	John Martin Thomas (1869–1952)	1921	1925	
10	Ralph D. Hetzel (1882–1947)	1927	October 3, 1947	
acting	James Milholland (1887–1956)	1947	1950	
Presidents of Pennsylvania State University (1953–present)
11	Milton S. Eisenhower (1899–1985)	1950	1956	
12	Eric A. Walker (1910–1995)	1956	1970	
13	John W. Oswald (1917–1995)	1970	June 30, 1983	
14	Bryce Jordan (1924–2016)	July 1, 1983	August 31, 1990	
15	Joab Thomas (1933–2014)	September 1, 1990	August 31, 1995	
16	Graham Spanier (born 1948)	September 1, 1995	November 9, 2011 (Note: Forced to resign for mishandling child abuse sex scandal case.)	
interim	Rodney Erickson (born 1946)	November 9, 2011	November 17, 2011	
17	Rodney Erickson (born 1946)	November 17, 2011	May 11, 2014	
18	Eric J. Barron (born 1951)	May 12, 2014	May 8, 2022	
19	Neeli Bendapudi (born 1962/63)	May 9, 2022	present	

Table notes:

== See also ==
- History of the Pennsylvania State University
