= History of Pennsylvania State University =

The Pennsylvania State University was founded on February 22, 1855 by act P.L.46, No.50 of the General Assembly of the Commonwealth of Pennsylvania as the Farmers' High School of Pennsylvania. Centre County became the home of the new school when James Irvin of Bellefonte donated 200 acres (809,000 m^{2}) of land and sold the trustees 200 acres more. In 1861, Penn State graduated its first class, marking the first graduates of a baccalaureate program at an American agricultural college. On May 1, 1862, the school's name was changed to the Agricultural College of Pennsylvania, and with the passage of the Morrill Land-Grant Act, Pennsylvania selected the school in 1863 to be the state's sole land grant college. In the following years, enrollment fell as the school tried to balance purely agricultural studies with more classic education, falling to 64 undergraduates in 1875, a year after the school's name changed once again to the Pennsylvania State College.

During this period, the college was financed by tuition and the sale of the land scrip which Pennsylvania received from the Federal government under the Morrill Act. The state did not appropriate funds for the maintenance of the college until 1887. However, the Legislature appropriated $50,000 to complete Old Main in 1860. In 1873, Rebecca Hannah Ewing became the college's first woman graduate.

The first African American admitted to Penn State was Ralph E. Brock in 1903 when he was enrolled at Pennsylvania State Forest Academy. The first African American to graduate was Calvin H. Waller, who earned a degree in agriculture. The first African-American woman admitted was Mildred Settle in 1929, and she was the first to graduate in 1932. She graduated with honors and the highest grades in the home economics department. The first full-time African American faculty member was Mary Godfrey, who was hired in 1956 as an assistant professor of art education.

== Presidents of Pennsylvania State University ==
Past Penn State presidents
Name	Tenure
Evan Pugh	1859–1864
William Henry Allen	1864–1866
John Fraser	1866–1868
Thomas Henry Burrowes	1868–1871
James Calder	1871–1880
Joseph Shortlidge	1880–1881
James Y. McKee †	1881–1882
George W. Atherton	1882–1906
James A. Beaver †	1906–1908
Edwin Erle Sparks	1908–1920
John Martin Thomas	1921–1925
Ralph Dorn Hetzel	1927–1947
James Milholland †	1947–1950
Milton S. Eisenhower	1950–1956
Eric A. Walker	1956–1970
John W. Oswald	1970–1983
Bryce Jordan	1983–1990
Joab Thomas	1990–1995
Graham Spanier	1995–2011
Rodney Erickson	2011–2014
Eric Barron	2014–2022
Neeli Bendapudi	2022–present
† denotes acting president

=== 7th President - George W. Atherton ===
George W. Atherton became president of the school in 1882, and began working to broaden the school's curriculum. He commissioned Reber to expand the mechanical arts program, who in 1884 proposed the construction of a building dedicated to the teaching of mechanic arts and filled it with carpentry and metalworking equipment obtained primarily through the donations of local industry. In 1886, the board of trustees approved the creation of a department of mechanical engineering. Shortly after, Penn State became one of the ten largest engineering schools in the nation. Atherton also expanded the liberal arts and agriculture programs, and as a result, was rewarded with regular appropriations from the state beginning in 1887. For this, Atherton is widely credited of saving Penn State from bankruptcy, and is still honored today by the name of a major road in State College and its suburbs, Atherton Street. Contrary to popular belief, Atherton Hall is not named after President Atherton but his wife Frances Atherton. Atherton's grave rests near Old Main, the University Park campus's central administration building, and is marked by an engraved marble block resting in front of his statue.

=== Early 20th century ===
In the years that followed, Penn State grew significantly, becoming the state's largest source of baccalaureate degrees and reaching an enrollment of 5,000 in 1936. Around this time, Commonwealth campuses were started by President Ralph Hetzel to give an alternative to Depression-era students who were economically unable to leave home to attend college.

=== Mid-20th century ===
In 1950 Penn State hired Milton Eisenhower, who was the President of Kansas State University, to be its President, and he served for six years. In 1953, the school's name changed to The Pennsylvania State University. Eisenhower's older brother Dwight Eisenhower delivered the Commencement address in June 1955. In 1955, Penn State dedicated its nuclear reactor, the second in the nation to be operated on a college campus. Under Eisenhower's successor, Dr. Eric A. Walker, the university developed rapidly. Under his leadership, which lasted from 1956 to 1970, the university added hundreds of acres of surrounding land, and nearly tripled enrollment to 40,000.

In 1963, the Hershey Trust offered Penn State $50 million gift to establish a new a Hershey Medical Center, a college of medicine and hospital in Hershey, Pennsylvania. Penn State's College of Medicine opened its doors to its first class of students in 1967, and Penn State Milton S. Hershey Medical Center accepted the first patients in 1970.

In 1965, Penn State began operating its educational television station, WPSX-TV.

=== Modern years ===
In the 1970s, The Pennsylvania State University became a state-related institution, like the University of Pittsburgh, Temple University, and Lincoln University. As such, it belongs to the Commonwealth System of Higher Education.

In recent years, Penn State's role as a leader in education in Pennsylvania has become well-defined. In 1989, the Pennsylvania College of Technology in Williamsport affiliated with the University, and in 1997, as did the Dickinson School of Law in Carlisle. Following a controversy as to whether the School of Law would relocate to the main campus, the school is co-located in both cities, with teleconferencing facilities allowing both campuses to share classes. In 2000, Penn State's endowment reached $1 billion. Currently, the university is the largest in Pennsylvania, and in 2003, it was credited with having the largest impact on the state economy of any organization, generating over $6 billion for the state on a budget of $2.5 billion. Even so, limited growth in state appropriations to the university has left the college as ranked with the lowest direct state appropriations per student in the Big Ten. The university has turned to philanthropy to replace state funding, with 2003 marking the end of the Grand Destiny campaign – a 7-year effort which raised over $1.3 billion for the University.

In 2004, Penn State started celebrating its 150th anniversary, since 2005 marks the University's sesquicentennial.
