= Penn State College of Engineering =

College unit in University Park, Pennsylvania, US

Coordinates: 40.80345°N 77.86612°W

College of Engineering
- Type: Public
- Established: 1896
- Dean: Tonya L. Peeples
- Undergraduates: 11,348 (Fall 2024, including University Park and Commonwealth Campuses)
- Postgraduates: 2,169 (Fall 2024, including University Park and World Campus)
- Location: University Park, Pennsylvania, U.S.
- Campus: Suburban
- Website: engr.psu.edu

The Penn State College of Engineering is the engineering school of the Pennsylvania State University, headquartered at the University Park campus in University Park, Pennsylvania. It was established in 1896, under the leadership of George W. Atherton. Today, with 13 academic departments and degree programs, over 11,000 enrolled undergraduate and graduate students (8,166 at the University Park campus, and 3,059 at other campuses), and research expenditures of $124 million for the 2016–2017 academic year, the Penn State College of Engineering is in the top 20 of engineering schools in the United States. It is estimated that at least one out of every fifty engineers in the United States got their bachelor's degree from Penn State. Dr. Justin Schwartz currently holds the position of Harold and Inge Marcus Dean of Engineering.

== History ==
=== The Early Years: 1855 – 1895 ===
In 1854, the Pennsylvania legislature granted a charter to The Farmers’ High School. The purpose of the institution, according to the 1859 catalogue, was to “adopt a system of instruction which shall embrace […] those departments of all sciences which have a practical or theoretical bearing upon agriculture.” The Pennsylvania State Agricultural Society encountered little resistance to the proposal, and the revised charter – dated February 22, 1855 – became the official founding day of what would become Penn State. A legislative appropriation of $25,000 – along with an additional pledge of $25,000, plus funds raised through public subscription and private donation – was used for the construction of the Main Building on 200 acres of in Centre County, near the geographic center of the state. The first class of 69 students was admitted in February 1859.

==== Pugh’s Establishment of an Engineering Foundation ====
Evan Pugh was selected as the first head of the Farmer's High School, and his appointment began in 1860. Pugh had received his Ph.D. from the University of Goettingen in 1854, and his vision for the Farmers’ High School included an expansion beyond agriculture into fields that would be of benefit to the nation as a whole. Chief among these were engineering and “industrial arts” – subjects which required a high degree of both theoretical and practical knowledge, such as surveying and carpentry.

This notion was considered radical at the time since American universities of Pugh's era tended to focus on topics such as ancient languages, philosophy, and rhetoric, which Pugh felt were inadequate for a nation seeking to “tame a hostile natural environment” and maintain economic and political importance upon the global stage. At the time of Pugh's appointment, fewer than 12 universities offered baccalaureate programs in engineering and produced fewer than 200 graduates combined; in most of those curricula, engineering was included as one of several subjects of study, rather than as its own major. The overarching belief was that because engineering was utilitarian and benefitted the many, it was inferior to the classics, which focused on the mental and moral improvement of the student; the prevailing thought – especially at tradition-bound schools such as Harvard, Yale, and Dartmouth – was that integrating engineering with classics would subvert the purpose of higher education. In Pugh's time, most engineering programs focused almost exclusively on developing skills within civil engineering – e.g. canals, railroads, bridges – for obvious reasons: the expansion of the nation required knowledge of developing infrastructure. Pugh realized that on-the-job training (the most common form of learning a profession), combined with the nation's economic and geographic growth, would not adequately meet the demand for educated professionals familiar with the “mechanic arts.”

The passing of the Morrill Land-Grant Acts in July 1862 presented Pugh with the opportunity to help secure the School's future. Under the terms of the Act, a land grant bequeathed upon an institution 30,000 acres for each senator and representative of the institution's state; this land was then to be sold, and the profits of the sale – which could take months or years to be fully realized – would be used to fund colleges with four-year curricula. Pugh was instrumental in securing the school as the sole recipient of all land-grant revenues in 1863, although his untimely death from typhoid in April 1864 resulted in his vision of industrial education being delayed by several decades.

==== Development of the Mechanic Arts Program ====
William H. Allen was elected to succeed Pugh in 1864. Allen was a professor of chemistry and natural history at Dickinson College. Unlike Pugh, Allen showed little interest in broadening the curriculum, and instead focused on the political challenges the university faced at the time: specifically, a debt of $50,000 (stemming, in part, from the university's inability to dispose of the 780,000 acres of land scrip granted by the Morrill Act) and lobbying efforts from other Pennsylvania colleges challenging university's designation as the commonwealth's sole land-grant institution. The lobbying efforts (and resulting redistribution bill) were defeated in 1865 but left the university in such a dire state financially that mortgage bonds of $80,000 were issued, both to pay off debt and to establish a working fund.

The first true champion of the mechanic arts at Penn State was John Fraser, appointed as a professor of mathematics in 1865 and as president of the university in 1866 after Allen's resignation. Fraser's time in the Union army served him well at Penn State, becoming the school's first lecturer in military tactics, and military drill was substituted for farm labor for the students. Fraser aimed to expand upon Pugh's vision, and the first four courses added for the 1868–69 academic year were general science, literature, mechanical and civil engineering, and metallurgy, mineralogy, and mining. Each was a four-year curriculum leading to a Bachelor of Science degree. The falling enrollment numbers of the time – 145 students in 1864–65, 114 in 1866, 82 in 1867, and 30 in 1868, with no class graduating in 1867 – led to a cautious approach to the expansion of the curriculum: the catalogue for the 1868–69 academic year listed mechanical and civil engineering, but the trustees did not hire faculty to provide instruction. After Fraser's resignation in March 1868, the trustees dissolved the new curricula and reduced the total faculty to four (two of whom eventually resigned), and the university faced a severe lack of public confidence in the stability of the institution.

Fraser was succeeded by Thomas H. Burrowes, who felt that the intentions of the Morrill Act would be best served by the original setup of the farmers’ high school. Burrowes reinstated manual labor and offered a single course of study. Under the Burrowes system, the Agricultural Course was mandatory, and students were awarded a Bachelor of Scientific Agriculture degree after three years of study. The (optional) fourth year was the Scientific Course, intended for “civil engineers, general mechanics etc.” and leading to a Bachelor of Science degree; despite its name, the Scientific Course included little formal instruction in engineering, and no engineering faculty were hired. A fifth year (also optional) was known as the Literary Course, which closely mirrored the traditional format of a classics education, and culminated in a Bachelor of Arts degree. The agriculture-intensive curriculum had minimal impact on enrollment: the 1870–71 academic year saw 59 enrolled students, 52 of which were in their first or second year of study. The fact that agriculture was insufficient to support an entire college was experienced by many land-grant institutions, and the challenge of incorporating a non-agriculture curriculum reform was exacerbated by the general indifference of the Pennsylvania legislature toward land-grant institutions as a whole. It was felt that, as the school was an instrument of the commonwealth, it should be supported via regular state appropriations; however, critique for curriculum reform was often received from Harrisburg, but not the money necessary to enact it. The financial burden from Allen's administration continued, and Burrowes died of exposure (as a consequence of a mountain outing with students) in February 1871 without seeing his three-course format implemented.

==== The Calder Era ====
The Reverend James Calder was elected as Penn State's fifth president in 1871. Calder eliminated Burrowes’ proposed three-course system and reinstated the four-year curriculum and felt that the Morrill Act envisioned more than simply formal instruction in agriculture, reincorporating several elements of orthodox classical institutions. The university began to offer non-agricultural baccalaureate degrees, and adopted the name Pennsylvania State College in 1874 to reflect the broadened curriculum. No provisions were made for mechanic arts, save for how they related to agriculture and scientific courses. Routine field demonstrations of various farm implements began to be incorporated into the curriculum, and civil engineering coursework was offered only at a high level; labs and practicums were nonexistent, as the “applications of knowledge” available at local businesses (e.g. textile factories, gas and water works, and coal mines) were felt to be sufficient. Meanwhile, colleges and universities across the nation with dedicated engineering departments rose to 70 by 1872 – more than half of which were land-grant endowments – and Penn State continued to lag due to the insistence on imitating classical institutions. The receipts from sale of land scrip were converted to an interest-bearing bond in 1872, leading to (among other things) the abolishing of tuition in 1874: students were instead charged a flat $20 annual fee for fuel, lighting, and janitorial service. Only 14 students graduated during 1875 – 1877, and dissatisfaction with Calder's administration among trustees, faculty, and the legislature led to his resignation in 1879.

==== Shortlidge and the McKee Interregnum ====
Joseph Shortlidge succeeded Calder in 1880, and his first act was to offend trustees, faculty, students, and the general public with his address at the commencement exercises in July 1880. The Shortlidge administration saw the formation of the Wickersham Committee, formed to assist with the massive reform needed to help the college satisfy the needs of the nation's most industrialized state. In Shortlidge's own words, “as an industrial college, we are a failure”; however, the three-professor panel was staffed with faculty whom Shortlidge believed would be lukewarm toward reorganization. The exception proved to be Thornton Osmond, professor of physics, who launched his own unofficial reorganization study – with the support of sympathetic faculty and trustees – due to the slowness of the Wickersham Committee and the entrenched stance of the other faculty on Shortlidge's panel. The very existence of Osmond's “committee” demonstrated how strained relations between the president and faculty had become, and Shortlidge presented his resignation in 1881 “couched in terms so offensive […] that the [trustees] accepted it forthwith.”

Osmond's recommendations were presented to – and almost immediately accepted by – acting president James Y. McKee. The proposed curriculum would include six courses of study: two “general” (scientific and classical holdovers from Calder), four “technical” (agricultural, natural history, chemistry, physics, and civil engineering), and practicums in the mechanic arts. This proposal was accepted by the trustees, who named Louis A. Barnard, a highly-experience civil engineer, to head the department of civil engineering. So confident were the trustees in Osmond's recommendations, and McKee's acceptance of them, that they asked the General Assembly to investigate the affairs of the college, calculating that the probe would vindicate the reorganization efforts and attract more students. When published in February 1882, the report not only vindicated the reorganization efforts, but also urged the Pennsylvania legislature to make “periodic and generous appropriations” to Penn State: “[…] the state should give it such fostering care as will make it not only an object of just pride, but a source of immeasurable benefit to our sons and daughters.”

==== Atherton and the Birth of the College of Engineering ====
The appointment of George Atherton as president in 1882 created an era of extraordinary stability and growth for Penn State. Top priority was given to enlarging the engineering program, and Atherton immediately approved an equipment expenditure of $3,000 for practicums and laboratory sessions. Atherton held strongly to the view that Penn State should be an engineering and industrial institution, rather than a classical one, and that classics should not be a “leading object” in a college curriculum. The logical conclusion of this was that mechanic arts were also to be placed on par with agriculture, given the rapid industrialization of the nation. All students now took identical coursework during their freshman and sophomore years, with a specialization in engineering reserved for their junior and senior years.

Additionally, short courses (three in agriculture, one in chemistry, one in mining, and one in elementary mechanics) began to be offered, with no admission or degree requirements.

Despite the improvements to the civil engineering curriculum, Atherton knew that further evolution was needed. To that end, he challenged Louis Reber, a mathematics instructor, to attend MIT for graduate work in mechanical engineering – and to pay particular attention to the processes and procedures used for engineering education – in order to develop Penn State's two-year mechanic arts program into a four-year mechanical engineering curriculum. Reber took to the challenge, and also studied engineering education methods in use at Worcester Polytechnic Institute, Stevens Institute of Technology, Washington University in St. Louis, and the University of Minnesota to establish a baseline for Penn State's program, which at that time consisted of mechanical drawing, woodworking, and carpentry. Reber also supervised the installation of a forge and foundry, and in 1884 asked for $3,500 to construct new building solely devoted to mechanic arts; Atherton immediately approved Reber's request, and the resulting building was the first structure erected for purely academic purposes. Machinery and equipment for the building were purchased at reduced prices from equipment manufacturers based on the advertising potential and inherent goodwill to be found in labeling items “for educational purposes.”

In addition to providing instruction, the mechanical engineering department also managed the pumphouse, steam heating plant, and (beginning in 1887) the fifty-horsepower steam engine and generator used to power the incandescent lighting at the campus. The students thus gained practical experience via the chores required to manage and maintain these machines. The creation of the mechanical engineering curriculum segregated students into “general” and “technical” paths (not entirely dissimilar to modern-day general education and major-specific instruction requirements), and the curriculum featured what is now considered “typical” coursework in science and mathematics, as well as several practicums (one for each of the fall, winter, and spring terms) to develop skills such as drawing, pattern making, surveying, chemistry, mechanics, forging, and machine construction.

Thornton Osmond also issued recommendations that electrical engineering be spun off into its own field (it had previously resided in the physics department); Atherton approved this request, and the Department of Physics and Electrotechnics was created in 1887 to explore the practical applications of electricity. The revised engineering curricula proved popular: of the 92 students enrolled for the 1887–88 academic year, over 35% were in engineering (18 mechanical, 15 civil). The subsequent year's enrollment rose to 113, of which 42% in engineering (22 mechanical, 17 civil, 9 electrical).

The growing popularity of the engineering curricula also required physical growth of the campus. In 1891, $100,000 was allotted to construct a building devoted entirely to engineering. This building, named Main Engineering, was dedicated on February 22, 1893, with most of the dedication speech focused on the importance of an engineering education to national prosperity and progress. Additional machinery, including Allis-Chalmers triple-expansion steam engine (extensively modified for laboratory instruction and experimentation), was purchased and installed. The engineering program continued to expand its offerings: in 1893, the trustees approved the addition of a course in mining engineering, with Magnus C. Ihlseng (formerly of the Colorado School of Mines) named professor and department head. Electrical engineering fully split from Physics and Electrotechnics, becoming its own department headed by John Price Jackson –who, at age 24, is easily the youngest department head on campus. By 1890, Main Engineering housed four engineering departments (civil, mechanical, mining, and electrical) in space originally intended for two. Increases in enrollment remained unceasing: in the 1890–91 academic year there were 127 undergraduates, 73 of which are in engineering (37 civil, 19 mechanical, 17 electrotechnical); by 1893, this had increased to 181 students, 128 in engineering (57 electrical, 44 mechanical, 18 civil, 9 mining). Needless to say, the overcrowding became problematic.

Coursework expansions were also underway. The department of civil engineering began to include instruction in sanitary and hydraulic engineering; however, students still did not yet have the opportunity to specialize in specific facet of desired profession outside of lab and thesis work. In 1894, a new curriculum requirement was added: all freshmen, sophomore, and junior engineering students were required to take a two-week summer course to gain field experience via visits to coal mines, railroad shops, foundries, power stations, and similar businesses. This marked the first offering of a summer session in Penn State history.

The increasing demand led to the formation of seven schools within Penn State. The Second Morrill Act (1890) gave each land-grant institution $15,000, which increased at a rate of $1,000 per year (to a maximum of $25,000), to be invested in instruction in agriculture, mechanic arts, etc. with “specific reference to their applications in the industry of life.” Engineering absorbed most of the at the expense of development of non-technical curricula. Atherton remained convinced that the college should increase instruction in liberal studies for all students, to become “[men] of broad culture and good citizen[s].” To that end, the establishment of the seven schools was intended to eliminate duplication of instruction and resources while also encouraging and facilitating cooperation among related departments. Perhaps most importantly, it also shifted the burden of administration from the president's office onto the deans. Louis Reber became the first dean of the school of engineering, which exercised authority over the civil, mechanical, and electrical engineering departments. The mining engineering curriculum formed the core for the School of Mines, with Magnus Ihlseng named as dean.

== Student body ==
The College of Engineering student body is relatively large, with a total of 8,166 undergraduate and 1,441 graduate students enrolled at University Park at the start of the Fall 2016 semester. The average class size for courses within the engineering majors is 25 students, and engineering students account for 21% of the total number of students in the Schreyer Honors College.

The average SAT score for accepted applicants is 1450 on the 1600 SAT, or 2086 on the 2400 SAT. The average GPA of applicants is 3.6. For the 2015–2016 academic year, the college awarded 1,712 undergraduate and 471 graduate degrees in engineering disciplines.

== Academic rankings and degrees offered ==
The Penn State College of Engineering offers bachelor's (B.S.), master's (M.S.), and doctorate (Ph.D. and D.Eng.) degrees in several majors. Master of Engineering (M.Eng.) degrees are offered in certain subjects as a professional degree. All majors listed below offer bachelor's degrees for their undergraduate programs. The M.S. degrees offered typically require research work culminating in a thesis (traditional M.S.), although some departments offer a non-thesis M.S. option. Several certificate options are also offered, including Engineering and Community Engagement; engineering design, housing, international engineering, nanotechnology; and space systems engineering.

Certain majors (such as surveying engineering and several engineering technology disciplines) are only offered at Penn State commonwealth campuses, whereas other disciplines (such as environmental systems engineering, materials science and engineering, mining engineering, and petroleum and natural gas engineering) are offered through the College of Earth and Mineral Sciences.

The departments of Materials Science and Engineering, Mining Engineering, Petroleum and Natural Gas Engineering, Environmental Systems Engineering, and Energy Engineering are under the College of Earth and Mineral Sciences. The Department of Materials Science & Engineering is ranked #10 nationally, and the petroleum engineering program is ranked #4 nationally.

The most recent rankings for Penn State's undergraduate engineering programs are:

Specialty	2018 Ranking
Aerospace/Aeronautical/Astronautical Engineering	15
Architectural Engineering	Not ranked
Biological/Agricultural Engineering	9
Biomedical Engineering	Not ranked
Chemical Engineering	17
Civil Engineering	14
Computer Engineering	Not ranked
Computer Science	Not ranked
Electrical/Electronic/Communications Engineering	Not ranked
Engineering Science	Not ranked
Environmental Engineering/Environmental Health Engineering	13
Industrial/Manufacturing Engineering	7
Materials Engineering	10
Mechanical Engineering	14
Nuclear Engineering	Not ranked

The most recent rankings for Penn State's graduate engineering programs are:

Specialty	2019 Ranking	Degrees Offered
Acoustics	1	M.Eng., M.S., Ph.D.
Aerospace/Aeronautical/Astronautical Engineering	15	M.Eng. M.S., Ph.D.
Architectural Engineering	Not ranked	M.Eng., M.S., Ph.D.
Biological/Agricultural Engineering	8	M.S., Ph.D.
Biomedical Engineering/Bioengineering	31	M.S., Ph.D., MD/Ph.D.
Chemical Engineering	24	M.S., Ph.D.
Civil Engineering	17	M.Eng., M.S., Ph.D.
Computer Engineering	26	M.Eng., M.S., Ph.D.
Electrical/Electronic/Communications Engineering	30	M.Eng., M.S., Ph.D.
Environmental/Environmental Health Engineering	17	M.Eng., M.S., Ph.D.
Industrial/Manufacturing/Systems Engineering	7	M.Eng., M.S., Ph.D.
Materials Engineering	12	M.Eng., M.S., Ph.D., MD/Ph.D.
Mechanical Engineering	16	M.Eng., M.S., Ph.D.
Nuclear Engineering	9	M.Eng., M.S., Ph.D.

The College of Engineering is also highly ranked at the program level:

Source	World	U.S.	U.S. Publics
U.S. News & World Report: Undergraduate		20	19
U.S. News & World Report: Graduate		33	20
Times Higher Ed	54	22	12
Shanghai	58	23	15
QS	111	22	11
Average	74	22	13

=== Starting salaries by major and return on investment ===
The median starting salaries for graduates with a bachelor's degree from the College of Engineering range from approximately $57,000 to over $83,000, depending on major, with bachelor's degree graduates from several majors earning a median salary of over $60,000. The college is ranked #19 in terms of best return on investment, with a thirty-year net average ROI of $789,300.

== Laboratory and Research Centers ==
In addition to intradepartmental research, Penn State College of Engineering faculty and students also conduct research through interdisciplinary research centers and interdisciplinary research institutes:

=== Interdisciplinary research units ===
- Applied Research Laboratory (ARL): a DOD designated U.S. Navy University Affiliated Research Center and the university's largest research unit
- Battery and Energy Storage Technology Center (BEST): specializing in the emerging research field of energy storage
- Center for Acoustics and Vibration (CAV): a group of nine laboratories performing interdisciplinary research into areas such as active and passive vibration control, adaptive structures, rotorcraft acoustics, underwater acoustics, and flow-induced noise and vibration
- Huck Institutes of the Life Sciences: a collection of institutes and Centers of Excellence performing research into fields such as ecology, bioinformatics, integrative and biomedical physiology, neuroscience, statistical genetics, and plant biology, among numerous others
- Institute for Computational Science: a high-performance computing facility capable of performing advanced simulation, statistical modeling, data analysis, data mining, and data mining
- Materials Research Institute: an interdisciplinary institute undertaking research efforts into 2D materials (e.g. graphene) and coatings, additive manufacturing, humanitarian materials, nanoscale electromagnetics, nanofibers, optical metamaterials, and piezoelectric thin films, among others
- Institute of Energy and the Environment: An interdisciplinary research institute dedicated to solving the world's critical energy and environmental challenges in the following themes: climate and ecosystem change, health and the environment, integrated energy systems, urban systems, and water and biogeochemical cycles.

=== Institutes ===
- Energy Engineering and Environmental Institute (E3I): focuses on topics such as water purification, remote sensing platforms for environmental studies, biofuels production in order to promote the development of sustainable technologies
- Facilities Engineering Institute: aims to advance facilities engineering objectives through applied research, and provides facilities engineering services and education programs, as well as energy management services to several Pennsylvania state agencies, the federal government, and several nonprofit organizations
- Institute for Networking and Security Research (INSR): offering expertise in mobile networking, protocol design, performance analysis, wireless communication, networked application, Internet security, secure operating systems, secure wireless ad hoc networks, and secure telecommunication systems
- Institute for Natural Gas Research: an integration of over two dozen research centers across all Penn State campuses, focused on transition to low-carbon energy supplies through unconventional oil and gas applications
- Larson Transportation Institute: a premier transportation research center hosting the Bus Research and Testing Center, the Center for Dirt and Gravel Road Studies, and the Northeast Center of Excellence for Pavement Technology

=== Centers and laboratories ===
- Center for Combustion, Power, and Propulsion: an internationally focused and collaborative center dedicated to the improved understanding of combustion fundamentals and application of combustion science to advanced technologies, including advanced power generation, energetic materials, and molecular dynamics modeling
- Center for e-Design: a joint coalition consisting of seven universities and several industry and government organizations, focusing on establishing new design tools to generate high-quality products at reduced cost
- Center for Health Organization Transformation: a cooperative research center funded by the National Science Foundation focusing on supporting healthcare management, clinical, and information technology innovations
- Center for Innovative Materials Processing Through Direct Digital Deposition (CIMP-3D): dedicated to advancing and deploying additive manufacturing technology of metallic and advanced material systems to critical components and structures
- Center for Innovative Sintered Products: a center focused on the development of new technology for sintered material, particulates, refractory, and hard materials
- Center for Multiscale Wave-Materials Interactions: a multidisciplinary center focused on the interactions of materials subjected to individual wavelengths and combinations of waves
- Center for Nanotechnology Education and Utilization: a National Science Foundation-funded Advanced Technology Education Center dedicated to the research and development of nanotechnology, including the incorporation of nanotechnology into both education and industry applications
- Center for Neural Engineering: an inter-college research center dedicated to the development of the next generation of medical smart devices for clinical treatments of diseases of the brain
- Center for Service Enterprise Engineering: the first U.S. academic center dedicated entirely to the study and practice of service engineering, focusing on the study, design, and implementation of revenue management, workforce planning, and service quality management; the Center focuses primarily on the hospitality, recreation, transportation, telecommunication, and security sectors
- Communications and Space Sciences Laboratory: an interdisciplinary research center focusing on electromagnetic phenomena for probing the dynamics of the atmosphere and ionosphere, as well as the study of electromagnetic phenomena such as pulse propagation and scattering and the design of antennae
- Electrochemical Engine Center: focused on conducting fundamental and applied research on fuel cells and advanced battery and energy storage technologies for electrochemical power devices, including electric propulsion and stationary power generation, as well as personal and portable electronics
- High Pressure Combustion Laboratory: focused on conducting fundamental and applied research on gaseous, solid, liquid, and gel propellants for rocket and gun propulsion systems, as well as metal combustion and solid fuels for ramjets and hybrid propulsion systems, ablation/erosion of rocket nozzle materials, insulation, and heat shield materials
- Housing Research Center: dedicated to serving the homebuilding industry through the improvement of the quality and affordability of housing
- Hydrogen Energy Center: an interdisciplinary center focused on hydrogen-based production and consumption technologies in an effort to promote hydrogen-centric efforts of sustainable energy production, including the conversion of biomass sources to energy and the development of new hydrogen storage technologies
- Indoor Environment Center: focused on interdisciplinary research in the areas of indoor air quality, aerobiological engineering, acoustics, and illumination in a sustainable context
- Microsystems Design Laboratory: focused on the development of special-purpose computers, design automation tools, leakage power management, intelligent computer architectures, ultra-low power computing, data center computing, and hardware security
- Radiation Science and Engineering Center: established to manage the university's nuclear research facilities, and to provide safe nuclear analytical and testing facilities to the university, government agencies, and corporations
- Vertical Lift Research Center of Excellence: one of three Vertical Lift Research Centers of Excellence in the United States, the VLRCOE engages in projects related the advancement of rotary-wing aircraft, including dynamics, aerodynamics, aeromechanics, acoustics, flight control, icing, HUMS, smart structures, advanced materials, active noise and vibration control, drivetrain technologies, and advanced aircraft design
- Wireless Communications and Networking Laboratory: dedicated to research in wireless communication technology, wireless networking, and information theory to develop secure, high-capacity, high-reliability wireless communication technology

== Student organizations ==
The College of Engineering hosts over fifty student-run organizations that encompass both national honors societies as well as specialized student-interest projects and competitions. These organizations encourage professional development, networking, recognition for outstanding academic achievement, and the opportunity to apply theoretical instruction to practical problems. Several organizations also feature periodic speaker meetings, which introduce students to current developments and trends in their field of study. These organizations include:

- Alpha Nu Sigma: Nuclear science and engineering honor society the national honor society for nuclear engineering, a competitive academic honor society established to recognize the top 25% of juniors and top 1/3 of seniors in their peer group.
- Alpha Pi Mu: A competitive academic honor society for industrial and systems engineering. Eligibility is limited to the top fifth of juniors (with a minimum GPA requirement of 3.20) and the top third of seniors (with a minimum GPA requirement of 3.00). Graduate students are eligible by recommendation from a department head.
- American Foundry Society (AFS): A professional society that aims to promote sustainability, industry stewardship, workforce development, development of castings, technical innovation, and education.
- AHS International: Formerly the American Helicopter Society, AHS is the world's only nonprofit technical society for scientists, engineers, researchers, and industry professionals involved in the development of vertical flight. AHS also hosts an annual design competition open to undergraduate and graduate students from around the world, with a particular emphasis on non-traditional vertical flight applications.
- AIAA: The world's foremost professional society for the field of aerospace engineering. AIAA also hosts an annual aircraft design competition open to undergraduate and graduate students worldwide.
- American Institute of Chemical Engineers (AIChE): A professional organization established to distinguish chemical engineering as a profession separate from chemists and mechanical engineers. The Penn State chapter of AIChE supports professional networking, research, and outreach among its student members.
- American Nuclear Society: A nonprofit professional development organization concerned with nuclear engineering and the development of nuclear consensus standards.
- American Society for Quality
- American Society of Agricultural and Biological Engineers (ASABE): An international technical and educational society of agricultural and biological engineering, ASABE has spent over a century focusing on developing sustainable solutions to meet the demands of an ever-growing population. The Penn State ASABE chapter focuses on agricultural education, environmental cleanup, and social events for its student members and the surrounding community, as well as professional networking.
- American Society of Civil Engineers(ASCE): An international nonprofit professional society dedicated to advancing the state of the art of civil engineering. The Penn State chapter of ASCE also focuses on hands-on projects for its student members, including Concrete Canoe and Bridges to Prosperity.
- American Society of Heating, Refrigerating, and Air Conditioning Engineers (ASHRAE): An international professional organization dedicated to the advancement of heating, ventilation, air conditioning, and refrigeration technologies and installations since 1894. In addition to professional conferences, ASHRAE also offers several certifications in the design, modeling, commissioning, and energy assessment of facilities.
- American Society of Mechanical Engineers (ASME): An international professional organization promoting multidisciplinary engineering, ASME is equal parts engineering society, R&D organization, and a standards organization. The Penn State chapter of ASME focuses on professional networking, leadership development, hands-on projects, design competitions, community volunteer work, and social interaction for its members.
- American Solar Energy Society (ASES): The American affiliate of the International Solar Energy Society and formed to advance the education, outreach, and policy of sustainable energy. The Penn State chapter of ASES involves students in the design and modeling of solar energy systems, and gives students the opportunity to participate in several hands-on projects such as a solar picnic table and a solar tracker.
- Association for Computing Machinery (ACM): The world's largest scientific and educational computing society, offering both professional and student awards and development opportunities in the field of computing. The Penn State ACM chapter hosts a number of events, including CodePSU, an outreach event intended to develop computer programming skills among university members in a challenging and competitive environment.
- Association for Women in Computing (AWC): A professional organization for women in computing, and a member of the Institute for the Certification of Computing Professionals, dedicated to the advancement of women in computing and the encouragement of women to pursue computing-relating careers. The Penn State chapter of AWC focuses on mentoring and tutoring, social events, hosting Girls Who Code-related events, and attendance of the Grace Hopper conference.
- Audio Engineering Society (AES): The only worldwide professional and standards organization dedicated exclusively to audio technology, AES is composed of engineers, scientists, and other audio professionals, including acousticians, audiologists, and academic researchers. The Penn State chapter of AES focuses on education, tutoring, speaker meetings, and equipment demonstration amongst its student members.
- Biomedical Engineering Society (BMES): A professional society for students, researchers, and industry professionals within the field of biomedical engineering. The Penn State chapter of BMES focuses on professional and social networking, as well as academic development opportunities for its student members.
- Chi Epsilon civil engineering honor society: The national honor society for civil engineering, currently consisting of over 100,000 members nationwide.
- Design Build Institute of America (DBIA): A professional organization dedicated to the teaching and promotion of best practices in the design and build process, focusing on design and construction services.
- Engineering Ambassadors: A professional and outreach organization focusing on inspiring middle and high school students toward a career in engineering.
- Engineering and Applied Sciences Interest House (EASI): The EASI (pronounced "easy") is a community-focused networking organization located in on-campus residence halls focused on connecting students with similar engineering and science classes, inspirations, and ideas. Members are encouraged to form various tutelage groups and participate in academic and campus outreach and social events.
- Engineering Graduate Student Council (EGSC): A professional development and networking organization focused on the promotion and enhancement of graduate studies within the Penn State community. EGSC also provides an open communication forum for students, faculty, researchers, and administration staff.
- Engineering House (E-House): A live-in community focused on supporting student projects and activities and providing students with leadership and social engagement opportunities.
- Engineering Leadership Society (ELS): A community-driven organization focused on innovation, leadership, and professional development. ELS encourages development of socially relevant technologies and hands-on competitions, including participation in the Rube Goldberg Machine Contest.
- Engineering Orientation Network (EON): A community and mentorship organization focusing on acclimating new students to life at Penn State, and providing opportunities for networking, social engagement, and professional development. EON also provides incoming freshmen with mentors within their selected major, as well as a pre-term orientation sessions that include activity fairs, design competitions, and prizes.
- Engineering Undergraduate Council (EUC): An administrative- and communications-focused organization that aims to connect student ideas and concerns with faculty and administrative staff, and also serves as part of the Academic Integrity Council.
- Engineers for a Sustainable World(ESW): The Penn State chapter of a nonprofit organization involving students in technical design projects focusing on sustainability, environmental, and clean technology issues. Projects are often enacted within the local community, although at times they may be international in scope.
- Engineers Without Borders (EWB): One of several global chapters focused on applying engineering principles to international development work, specifically with serving the needs of disadvantaged communities and peoples worldwide.
- Eta Kappa Nu Electrical Engineering honor society: The international honor society for electrical and computer engineering, now an organizational unit of IEEE. The Penn State chapter of Eta Kappa Nu consists of the top 33% of seniors and top 25% of juniors within the majors of electrical engineering, computer engineering, and computer science.
- Human Factors and Ergonomics Society (HFES): An interdisciplinary professional organization focused on promoting a knowledge exchange of human characteristics that are relevant to system and device design.
- Illuminating Engineering Society (IES): Part of the department of Architectural Engineering, the Penn State chapter of IES is an interdisciplinary professional organization dedicated to promoting the art and science of lighting.
- Industrial Engineering Graduate Student Association (IEGA):An academic and social group focused on providing academic mentorship and a social platform for students to interact with peers and faculty.
- Institute for Operations Research and the Management Sciences (INFORMS): An international professional society focused on operations research, management science, and data analytics. The Penn State chapter of INFORMS aims to provide applications of operations research and management science to fields such as transportation, banking, manufacturing, insurance, healthcare, and supply chain management.
- Institute of Electrical and Electronics Engineers (IEEE): The largest professional organization for electrical, computer, electronics, radio, and associated engineering disciplines, with a focus on the educational and technical development of electrical and electronics engineering. The Penn State chapter of IEEE hosts career fairs, speaker events, professional networking events, hands-on workshops, and social and community events throughout the year.
- Institute of Industrial and Systems Engineers (IISE): Formerly the Institute of Industrial Engineers, IISE is a professional society dedicated to supporting the industrial engineering profession, with a particular focus on quality and productivity improvements. The Penn State chapter of IISE provides leadership development, as well as professional networking and academic and social events.
- Institute of Transportation Engineers (ITE): An international educational and scientific society of transportation professionals, with a focus on the application of technical and scientific efforts to meet the mobility and safety needs of the ground transportation industry. The Penn State chapter of ITE focuses on the promotion and advancement of transportation and traffic engineering, professional networking, partnership with consulting firms on traffic and mobility research projects, and social engagement.
- International Association for the Exchange of Students for Technical Experience (IAESTE): An international organization connecting students with opportunities to perform technical work abroad in one of over 80 countries, with sessions lasting from four weeks to eighteen months. IASTE aims to provide students with both technical experience and cultural education. The Penn State chapter of IASTE seeks to provide student members with internships, hands-on technical experience, and a deepening of its members' cultural understanding.
- Lunar Lion: A privately funded organization seeking to design, develop, launch, and deploy a spacecraft onto the lunar surface.
- National Association of Home Builders (NAHB): One of the largest trade societies in the country, consisting primarily of home builders and remodelers, as well as mortgage and building products and services professionals.
- National Society of Black Engineers (NSBE): A national networking organization focused on the recruitment and retention of black and minority engineers in academia and industry. The Penn State chapter of NSBE focuses on professional networking, leadership development, social engagement.
- North American Society for Trenchless Technology (NASTT): A multidisciplinary professional society focused on reducing the environmental and social cost of trenching, including the development of standards, educational programs, training, and research and development.
- Omega Chi Epsilon chemical engineering honor society: An academic society recognizing excellence in the field of chemical engineering, open to juniors and seniors with a GPA of at least 3.5. The Penn State chapter of Omega Chi Epsilon focuses on providing quality developmental opportunities for the professional development of its members, including mentoring, tutoring, community outreach programs, and professional networking.
- Penn State Advanced Vehicle Team: A hands-on project team that competes in the Advanced Vehicle Technology competitions hosted by the United States Department of Energy. Teams re-engineer donor vehicles with hybrid-electric and other cutting-edge technologies to gain improvements in fuel efficiency and emissions.
- Penn State Formula SAE – Penn State Racing: A hands-on project team that participates in the annual Formula SAE competition, which requires the design, fabrication, and testing of a formula-style race car in several events, including acceleration, autocross, and endurance.
- Penn State Robotics Club: A multidisciplinary club dedicated to the design, building, testing, and deploying of robotics for a variety of applications.
- Penn State Surveying Society: An organization dedicated to providing instruction in the discipline of surveying to student members. Activities within the organization also include fundraising, community outreach, campus service projects, professional development, and social engagement.
- Phi Sigma Rho: The national sorority for women in engineering and engineering technology, focused on engaging female engineering students within the Greek community while excelling in their academic progress. The Penn State chapter of Phi Sigma Rho aims to develop high standards of personal integrity and respect and promotes academic support and social engagement amongst its members.
- Pi Tau Sigma mechanical engineering honor society: An academic honor society open to both undergraduate and graduate students, based on academic achievement as well as engineering ability, personality, scholarship, and likelihood of future success. For undergraduates, eligibility is limited to the top 25% of the student's class for juniors and the top 35% of the student's class for seniors.
- Society of Engineering Science (SES): A national professional organization aiming to promote the exchange of information pertinent to the field of engineering science. The Penn State chapter of SES is focused primarily on the needs of Engineering Science majors, but open to all engineering majors.
- Society of Hispanic Professional Engineers (SHPE): A professional, technical, and networking group created to serve as role models for the Hispanic community. SHPE chapters are also actively involved in raising awareness of the need for STEM graduates and professionals in order to enable the U.S. to maintain a strong economic and technical advantage in the global marketplace. The Penn State chapter of SHPE focuses on leadership and professional development, community outreach, and social engagement for its members.
- Society of Women Engineers (SWE): A nonprofit service, educational, and professional organization focused on the development of women in the engineering and engineering technology fields.
- Partnership for Achieving Construction Excellence (PACE): An educational and professional organization focused on improving partnerships between the university and the construction industry through innovation and technological development.
- Tau Beta Pi Engineering Honor Society: The oldest engineering honor society in the United States, honoring students with a demonstrated history of academic achievement, personal development, and professional integrity. The Penn State chapter of TBP is by invitation-only, and is open to undergraduate students in the top eighth of their class, or seniors within the top fifth of their class. The semester-long candidacy process also requires successful completion of interviews and participation in several chapter activities and community work.
- Theme Park Engineering Group (TPEG): A professional development organization providing opportunities to collaborate with working professionals of the theme park industry. TPEG also provides opportunities for real-world experience on design projects, as well as networking and social engagement with other students, faculty, and industry professionals.
- Triangle Fraternity: A national social fraternity, with membership limited to students majoring in engineering, architecture, mathematics, and the physical, biological, and computer sciences. The Penn State chapter of Triangle focuses on academic and professional development, as well as leadership development, community service, and social and professional networking.
- Undergraduate Research Society (URS): A STEM-focused organization open to undergraduate students of all majors, focused on helping interested students find research opportunities via professional networking, peer mentoring, faculty networking, and career development activities.
- Unmanned Aerial Systems Club: An interdisciplinary organization focused on the design, build, and study of unmanned aerial systems as a method of helping each student attain their educational, personal, and professional goals. The club also participates in various competitive events hosted by AUVSI, specifically the Small Unmanned Aerial Systems Competition, which requires the design, fabrication, integration, and demonstration of an unmanned aircraft capable of autonomous flight and navigation.

== Notable alumni ==
The College of Engineering has over 100,000 living engineering alumni. The Penn State Engineering Alumni Society (PSEAS) is the oldest active alumni group at The Pennsylvania State University. Notable alumni include:

- Benson L. Dutton (1933, Civil Engineering), the first African-American to graduate from Penn State's College of Engineering.
- William E. Deifenderfer (1938, Mechanical Engineering), Senior Vice President of United Technologies.
- Stephen Lawroski (1939 M.S., 1943 Ph.D., Chemical Engineering), former chemical engineer on the Manhattan Project and participant of the Atoms for Peace program. Appointed to the general advisory committee of Atomic Energy Commission by President Lyndon B. Johnson in 1964, also serving on the Advisory Committee on Reactor Safeguards before retiring as associate director of Argonne National Laboratory.
- Benjamin Paul Blasingame (1940), manager of Delco Electronics and Air Force Colonel who worked on engineering and research teams at The Pentagon advocating for the development of the turbofan jet engine, and served as Chief Guidance Officer in the Air Force missile development program. His career included the development of booster-rocket guidance systems, gyro-stabilized firing systems, and inertial navigation systems for commercial airliners and military transports, and has received a Department of Defense Medal for Distinguished Public Service, a NASA Exceptional Public Service Medal, the Legion of Merit, a Presidential Commendation Medal, and is a member of the National Aviation Hall of Fame.
- David E. Pergrin (1940, Civil Engineering), commanding officer of the 291st Engineer Combat Battalion who served in the Battle of the Bulge and the Battle of Remagen during World War II.
- Jacob M. Geist (1942 M.S., Chemical Engineering), a major contributor to cryogenics process safety for liquefied natural gas.
- Karl H. Norris (1942, Agricultural Engineering), whose work contributed to the discovery of phytochrome.
- Max S. Peters (1942 B.S., 1947 M.S., 1949 Ph.D., Chemical Engineering), National Academy of Engineering inductee and leading air pollution researcher whose studies led to the development of the catalytic converter.
- Donald R. F. Harleman (1943, Civil Engineering), internationally recognized expert in water quality and waste treatment who led harbor cleanup efforts in numerous countries worldwide.
- Lee Strohl Gaumer, Jr. (1948, Chemical Engineering), former Technical Director of Air Products and responsible for the liquefaction of hydrogen for the Apollo and Space Shuttle programs. Gaumer also worked on the Manhattan Project and at the White Sands Missile Range while serving in the Army. Gaumer also received numerous awards during his career, including the Distinguished Engineers Award (National Society of Professional Engineers) and the Apollo Achievement Award (NASA), and served as a Fellow of the American Institute of Chemical Engineers and a Member of the National Academy of Engineering.
- Harry Lawroski (1950 B.S., 1956 M.S., 1959 Ph.D., Chemical Engineering), former president of the American Nuclear Society.
- Russel H. Herman, Jr. (1951, Chemical Engineering), former president and CEO of Esso Eastern, an Exxon company, and former Executive Vice President of Esso Europe.
- John H. Sinfelt (1951 B.S., 1953 M.S., 1954 Ph.D., Chemical Engineering), whose research on catalytic reforming led to the development of unleaded gasoline.
- William L. Weiss (1951, Industrial Engineering), former chairman and CEO of Ameritech, one of the Baby Bells formed after the 1984 AT&T divestiture.
- Thomas D. Larson (1952 B.S., 1959 M.S., 1962 Ph.D., Civil Engineering), former Pennsylvania Secretary of Transportation, former Administrator of the Federal Highway Administration, and Director of the Pennsylvania Transportation and Safety Center.
- John C. Villforth (1952 B.S., 1954 M.S., Sanitary Engineering), Chief Engineer of the US Public Health Service Commissioned Corps.
- Lincoln A. Warrell (1953, Chemical Engineering), owner of several confectionary companies and inductee of the Candy Hall of Fame.
- Paul J. Weitz, Jr. (1954, Aerospace Engineering), naval test pilot, NASA astronaut, and Commander of STS-6, the maiden flight of the Space Shuttle Challenger.
- Frank Gabron (1955 M.S., Mechanical Engineering), senior combustion research engineer at United Technologies Corporation and responsible for initial development of the combustion technology used in the RL-10 rocket engine. Gabron also earned a NASA Achievement Award for his work on the development of equipment used during the Apollo 11 space flights.
- Albertus D. Welliver (1956, Mechanical Engineering), former Vice President of Boeing and manager of the Boeing 777 airliner.
- James E. Marley (1957, Aerospace Engineering), former CEO of AMP Industrial prior to its acquisition by Tyco International, now TE Connectivity.
- Ted T. Szabo (1958 Ph.D., Chemical Engineering), Auschwitz survivor and Division President of Union Carbide Corporation.
- John J. Yeosock (1959, Industrial Engineering), Lieutenant General of the United States Army and commander of the 3rd U.S. Army during Operation Desert Shield and Operation Desert Storm.
- Gerard M. Faeth (1961 M.S., 1964 Ph.D., Mechanical Engineering), principal investigator for numerous combustion experiments on Space Shuttle missions, author of over 230 journal papers and 200 conference papers, and presenter of over 200 invited lectures.
- Guion Bluford (1964, Aerospace Engineering), USAF Colonel, former NASA astronaut, and the first African American in space.
- Harold W. Gehman, Jr. (1965, Industrial Engineering) served as commander-in-chief of the U.S. Joint Forces Command and NATO Supreme Allied Commander, Atlantic until he retired in 2000. In 2003 he was appointed to head the investigation of the Space Shuttle Columbia disaster.
- Thomas A. Bathgate (1970, Architectural Engineering), President and CEO of PWI Engineering and leader in sustainable engineering and energy conservation efforts for building complexes since 1973.
- Gregory Lucier (1986, Industrial Engineering), president and CEO of Invitrogen.
- Mark Alpert (1980, Environmental Engineering), president of Integrated Delivery Solutions.

Former faculty include Amos E. Neyhart, a traffic safety education pioneer and creator of the first driver education classes in the United States in 1933. Inyong Ham, a Penn State professor (1958–95) and an IIE Fellow, was known for his development of group technology and research on the use of computers in manufacturing and process planning.

== Firsts ==
- First accredited in 1936, Architectural Engineering program at Penn State is nation's oldest continuously accredited curriculum in this field.
- In 1923, professor Paul Schweitzer started one of the first systematic research programs in diesel engineering in United States.
- In 1909, the first Industrial Engineering academic department and baccalaureate program in the nation were established at Penn State.
- In 1960, Penn State established the first national curriculum in solid-state technology and in 1962 created the interdisciplinary materials research laboratory.
- In 1965, Penn State Aerospace engineer Barnes W. McCormick led a research team that made the first wake turbulence measurements behind a full-scale airplane.
