= 291st Engineer Combat Battalion (United States) =

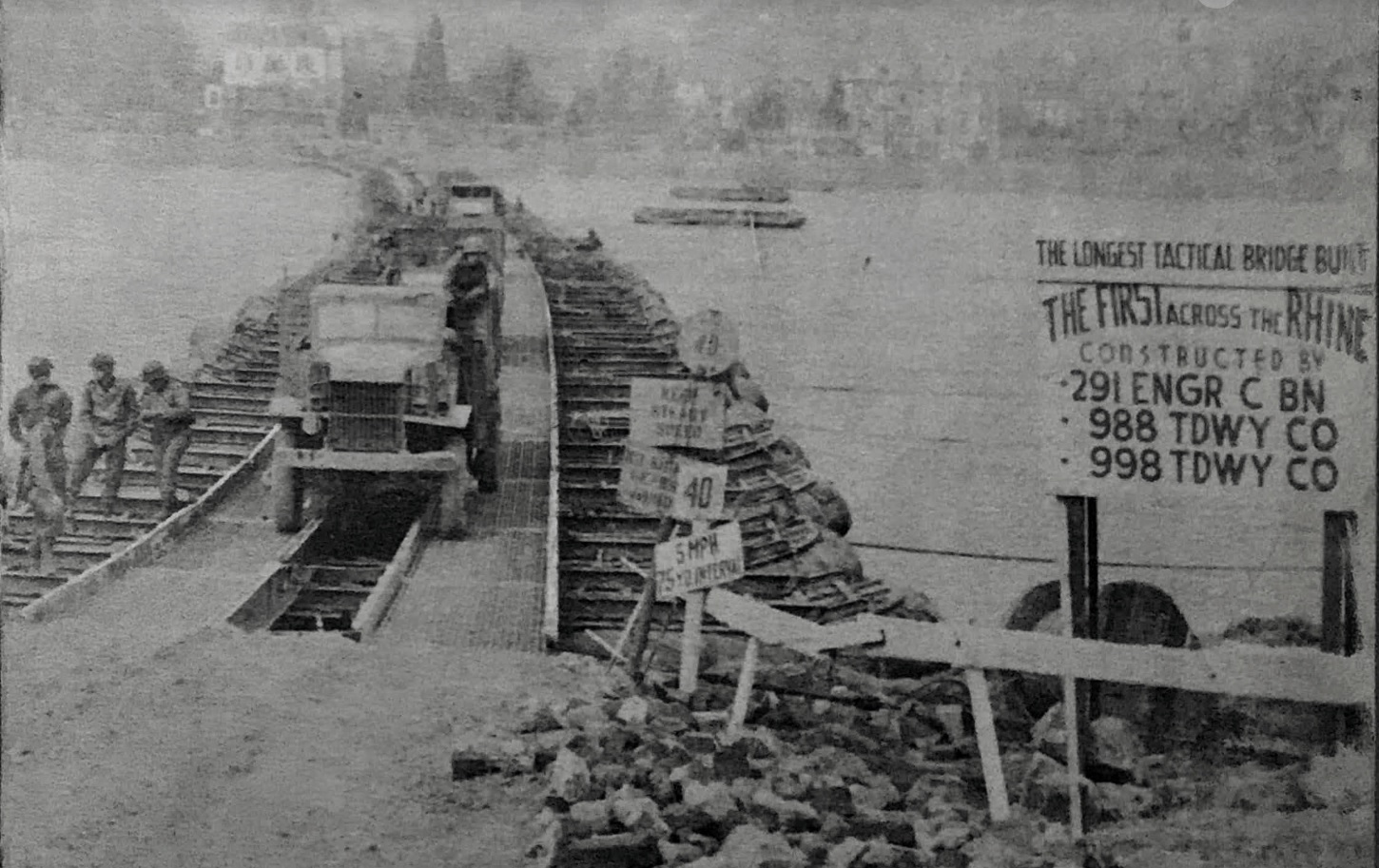
- This 1032 foot long treadway bridge was the first tactical bridge built across the Rhine River completed on 10 March 1945. It was constructed under heavy enemy fire in 32 hours about 400 meters downstream from the Ludendorff Bridge during the Battle of Remagen.
- Active: 29 March 1943-20 October 1945
- Country: United States
- Branch: United States Army
- Type: Combat engineer
- Size: Battalion
- Nickname: Damned Engineers
- Engagements: World War II: Battle of the Bulge; Battle of Remagen
- Decorations: Presidential Unit Citation

Commanders
- Notable commanders: Colonel David E. Pergrin

The 291st Engineer Combat Battalion was one of the most decorated engineer combat battalions of the United States Army during World War II, playing notable roles both in the Battle of Bulge and the Rhine river crossing at Remagen.

The battalion was activated at Camp Swift, Texas, on 29 March 1943, by the redesignation of the 2nd Battalion, 52nd Engineer Regiment.

Commanded by Colonel David E. Pergrin, it earned a Presidential Citation for its performance in the Ardennes, blowing up bridges and fighting as infantry in helping stunt the German advance towards Antwerp. Scouting parties of the 291st discovered 17 survivors of the Malmedy massacre on 17 December 1944. After nearly a month of grueling counter measures against the initial Panzer forces led by Joachim Peiper, the battalion's C Company returned to Malmedy to discover the bodies of 86 murdered US GIs frozen under a thick blanket of snow on 14 January 1945.

The battalion led the construction of the first pontoon bridge across the Rhine at Remagen to take traffic pressure off the severely damaged Ludendorff Bridge before its collapse. The span made a material contribution in facilitating the U.S. Army's drive into central Germany.

From an initial force of roughly 600 men, the battalion suffered 93 wounded and 8 killed in action by war's end. During its tour of Europe, the 291st had constructed 23 timber bridges, 44 Bailey bridges, 7 treadway bridges, constructed 11 bridges under fire, destroyed 6 bridges, made 7 river assault crossings, deactivated 15 bombs, cleared 7000 mines, and taken 8500 German prisoners. The battalion was inactivated at Camp Patrick Henry, Virginia, on 20 October 1945.

== Capabilities ==
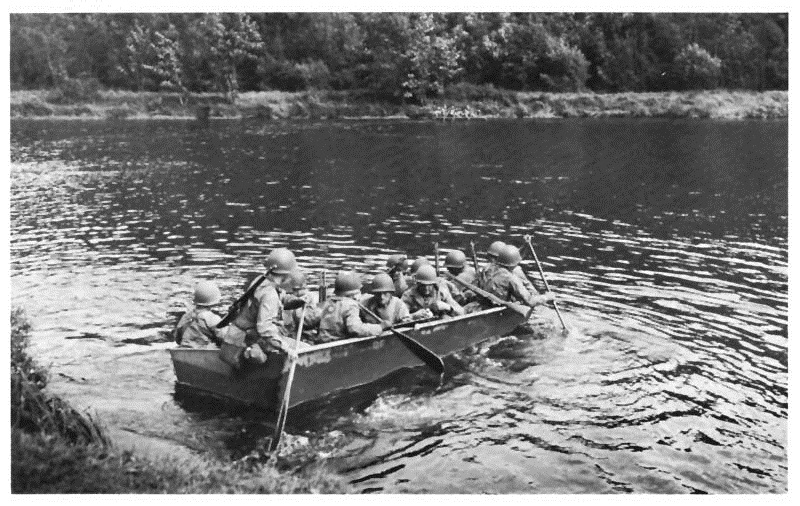
US Army combat engineers ferry infantrymen in an M2 assault boat

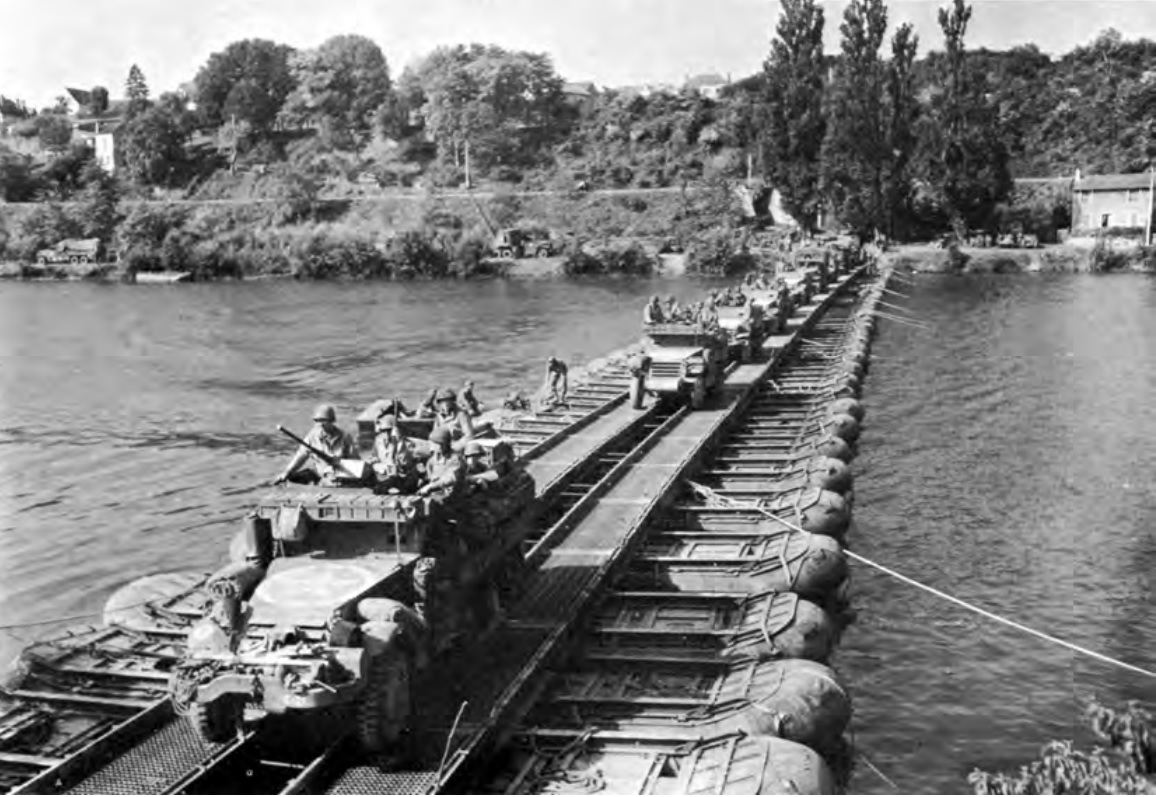
A US military treadway bridge supported by pneumatic pontoons

As a combat engineer battalion the 291st was capable of providing combat support essential to sustaining operating forces in the theater of war. These spanned such diverse activities as construction, demolition, sanitation, map production, minefield clearing, and unit intelligence.

Combat engineer battalions also fielded defensive .30 cal. and .50 cal. machine gun squads, anti-tank rocket and grenade launchers, and were required to fight as infantry when needed.

The range of services provided included but was not limited to:

- Bridge (mobile, floating, fixed), rail, & road construction and maintenance
- Conducting river crossings by ponton/raft, motor-powered assault boats
- Demolition
- Placing/de-arming munitions, including mines
- Port & harbor maintenance and rehabilitation, including beachheads:

- Laying roads and unloading/loading supplies, vehicles & personnel from transport and cargo ships

- Camouflage
- Water supply and sanitation
- Map production
- Vehicle maintenance
- Establishing/maintaining supply and ammunition dumps
- Building barracks, depots, and similar structures
- Rescue & road patrols, bridge and road reconnaissance
- Clearing of debris and wreckage
- Serving as infantry when needed

These included the deployment and operation of assault boats and the construction of various pontoon bridges, including M1 treadways, and modular steel truss Bailey bridges.

== Presidential Citation ==
The 291st received a Presidential Citation for its "outstanding performance of duty in action" for holding a defensive position against a German offensive from 17 December to 26 December in the Ardennes during the Battle of the Bulge:

As authorized by Executive Order No. 9396 (sec. I, Bul. 22, WD, 1943), superseding Executive Order No. 9075 (sec. III, Bul. 11, WD, 1942), citation of the following unit in General Orders, No. 30. Headquarters First United States Army, 18 February 1945, as approved by the Commanding General, European Theater of Operations, is confirmed under the provisions of section IV, Circular No. 333, War Department, 1943, in the name of the President, of the United States as public evidence of deserved honor and distinction. The citation reads as follows:

The 291st Engineer Combat Battalion is cited for outstanding performance of duty in action against the enemy from 17 to 26 December 1944, in Belgium. On 17 December 1944, at the beginning of the German Ardennes break-through, the 291st Engineer Combat Battalion was assigned the mission of establishing and manning roadblocks south and east of Malmedy, and with the defense of the town itself. The battalion set up essential roadblocks and prepared hasty defenses. Shortly thereafter, numerically superior enemy infantry and armored columns moving in the direction of Malmedy were engaged. Though greatly outnumbered and constantly subjected to heavy enemy artillery, mortar, and small-arms fire, the officers and men of the 291st Engineer Combat Battalion stubbornly resisted all enemy attempts to drive through their positions. Repeated attacks were made by enemy armor and infantry on roadblocks and defensive positions and, in each instance, were thrown back with heavy losses by the resolute and determined resistance. The determination, devotion to duty, and unyielding fighting spirit displayed by the personnel of the 291st Engineer Combat Battalion, in delaying and containing a powerful enemy force along a route of vital importance to the Allied effort, are worthy of high praise.

== Images ==
The 291st in Action

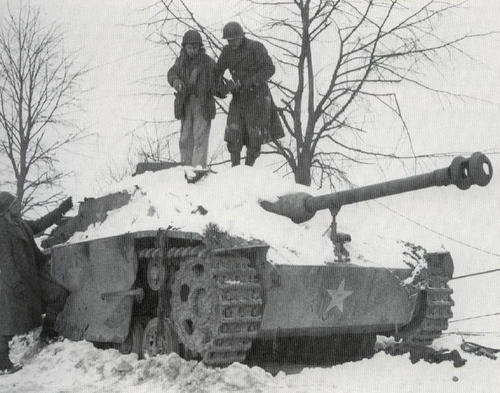
Engineers from the 291st disarm a booby-trapped Sturmgeschütz III during the Battle of the Bulge

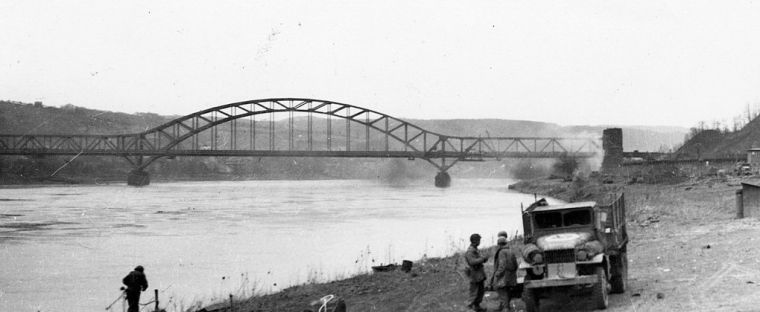
The Ludendorff Bridge before its collapse into the Rhine

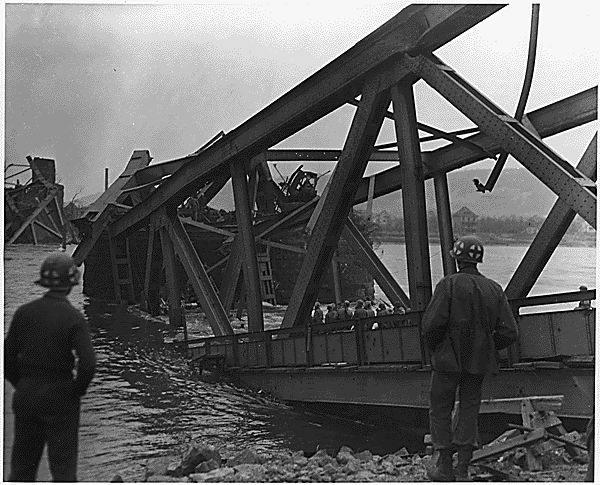
The Ludendorff Bridge after its collapse

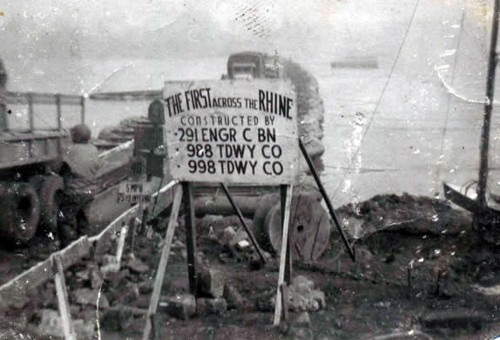
Sign erected by the 291st declaring their bridge the first over the Rhine at Remagen

Army footage showing March 10 construction and bombing near the Rhine treadway bridge (1 minute).

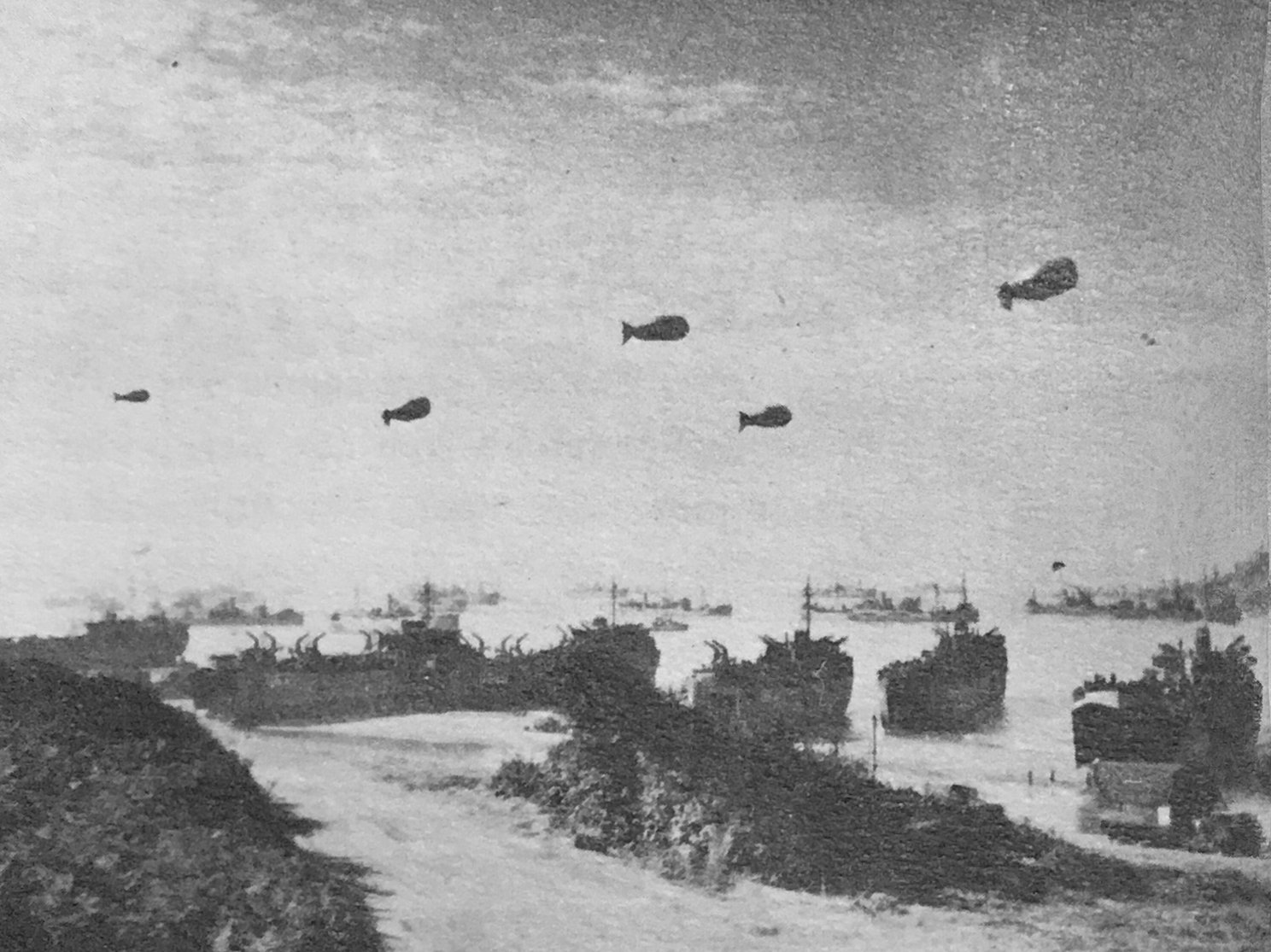
View of Barrage balloons above Omaha Beach on June 24, 1944 as seen by the 291st after arriving from Southampton, England aboard a Landing Ship.
