= James Milholland =

Acting president of Penn State University

President of the Pennsylvania State University Acting
- In office 1947–1950
- Preceded by: Ralph Dorn Hetzel
- Succeeded by: Milton S. Eisenhower

Personal details
- Born: October 25, 1887 Pittsburgh, Pennsylvania
- Died: February 14, 1956 (aged 68) Pittsburgh, Pennsylvania

James Milholland (October 25, 1887 – February 14, 1956) was acting President of the Pennsylvania State University, serving from the death of Ralph Dorn Hetzel in 1947 until 1950. He later worked as a judge. He died after multiple heart attacks in 1956.

Milholland graduated from Pennsylvania State University in 1911, where he had been an undergraduate member of Phi Sigma Kappa fraternity.
