= David E. Pergrin =

American army officer

- Born: 26 July 1917; Elizabeth, Pennsylvania
- Died: 7 April 2012 (aged 94); Shrewsbury, Pennsylvania
- Military career
- Allegiance: United States of America
- Branch: United States Army
- Service years: 1940–1945
- Rank: Colonel
- Commands: 291st Engineer Combat Battalion
- Conflicts: World War II: Siegfried Line Campaign; Battle of the Bulge; Operation Lumberjack
- Awards: Presidential Unit Citation; Belgian Croix de Guerre; French Croix de Guerre; Silver Star; Bronze Star Medal; Purple Heart; European-African-Middle Eastern Campaign Medal; World War II Victory Medal; Silver de Fleury Medal

Colonel David E. Pergrin (26 July 1917 – 7 April 2012) was commanding officer of the 291st Engineer Combat Battalion of the United States Army during World War II. Before the war he earned an engineering degree at Pennsylvania State University, graduating in 1940. While at Penn State he participated in the ROTC program. In addition, Pergrin played on the university's football team, was elected to the Tau Beta Pi and Chi Epsilon engineering honor societies, and was senior class president. Before graduation he was voted Outstanding Non-Fraternity senior. In his role as senior class president, he presented the university with the Class of 1940 gift – the Nittany Lion Shrine, a 14-ton limestone monument symbolizing the Penn State tradition. However, the monument was not officially dedicated until 1942.

== Military service ==
Pergrin was called to active duty in April 1941, with the rank of 2nd Lieutenant. After helping train numerous engineering platoons and companies, he was transferred to the new 291st Engineer Combat Battalion in April, 1943 to assist in its training. In August, he was given command of the battalion when it completed its states-side training. During training in the United States and Britain, then Major, later Lt. Colonel, Pergrin emphasized individual leadership which he credited as the main reason for the unit's success in completing its missions, especially while under enemy fire.

=== Battle of the Bulge ===
The battalion served in France, Belgium and Germany. It was particularly effective as the engineer unit that primarily caused the delay of the advance elements of the Sixth Panzer Army, especially the Kampfgruppe under command of Joachim Peiper, during the Battle of the Bulge. Individual squads and platoons blew bridges, planted mines, and defended roadblocks in the face of oncoming tank columns, causing further confusion in German plans. Upon seeing another bridge blown up just as his tanks reached it, Peiper is said to have uttered the words, "Diese verdammten Pioniere!, Diese verdammten Pioniere!" ("Those damned engineers! Those damned engineers!"). Kampfgruppe Peiper was eventually contained and the Waffen-SS tankers had to abandon their vehicles.

Elements of the 291st were the first American soldiers to contact and rescue wounded survivors of the Malmedy massacre, and it was Pergrin who initially reported the massacre to higher headquarters. Later, toward the end of the Battle of the Bulge, the 291st was assigned responsibility to uncover the bodies of soldiers massacred at Malmedy for Graves Registration Service troops and documenting officers.

=== Battle of Remagen ===
Due to its stellar reputation for working under enemy fire, the battalion was selected to build a treadway bridge down the Rhine river from the Ludendorff Bridge captured during the Battle of Remagen. The 291st began constructing the treadway bridge at 8:30 AM on 9 March about .25 miles (0.40 km) down river. The crews and the treadway bridge were struck by artillery and tank rounds and suffered several direct hits, slowing work on the bridge. They completed the first tactical bridge across the river in 32 hours at 5:10 PM on 10 March. At 1,032 feet (315 m) it was the longest tactical bridge ever built under fire. A German forward artillery observer with a radio was captured in Remagen, and artillery fire gradually let up.

=== Recognition ===
The 291st was the most decorated combat engineering unit of World War II. The unit built more than 70 bridges—19 while under enemy fire—, cleared land mines, and demolished bridges during the Battle of the Bulge. It received the Presidential Unit Citation and other awards for its performance during the Battle of the Bulge.

Pergrin was recognized with the Purple Heart, Silver Star, Bronze Star, Presidential Unit Citation, Croix de Guerre from France and Belgium, and the silver order of the De Fleurry Medal. In 1998, he was awarded the Freedom Foundation's George Washington Medal of Honor.

== Post war ==
In 1988, Pergin received Penn State University's Outstanding Engineer Award.

He also took up woodcarving as a hobby and published three tutorials about wood carving animals.

- The Carver's Handbook I: Woodcarving the Wonders of Nature. 1984. ISBN 0-88740-015-9
- The Carver's Handbook II: Carving the Wild Life of the Forest and Jungle. 1985. ISBN 0-88740-029-9
- The Carver's Handbook III: Woodcarving Wild Animals. 1985. ISBN 0-88740-039-6
