= John Martin Thomas =

American administrator (1869–1952)

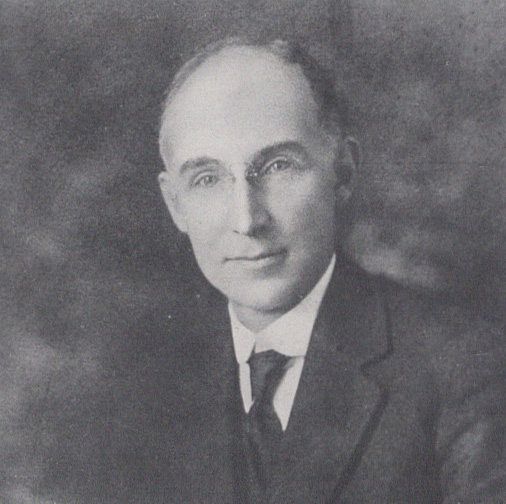
- Thomas pictured in La Vie 1922, Penn State yearbook

12th President of Rutgers University
- In office 1925–1930
- Preceded by: William H. S. Demarest
- Succeeded by: Philip Milledoler Brett

Personal details
- Born: December 27, 1869 Fort Covington, New York, U.S.
- Died: February 26, 1952 (aged 82) Rutland, Vermont, U.S.
- Spouse: Sarah Grace Seely (m. 1893)
- Children: 5

John Martin Thomas (December 27, 1869 – February 26, 1952) was an American academic administrator who served as the ninth president of Middlebury College, the ninth president of Penn State, and the twelfth president of Rutgers University.

== Biography ==
Born in Fort Covington, New York, Thomas was an alumnus of Middlebury College, and the Union Theological Seminary. He married Sarah Grace Seely on May 18, 1893, and they had five children.

He served as a pastor at the Arlington Avenue Presbyterian Church in East Orange, New Jersey from 1893 to 1908. In 1908, he was appointed President of Middlebury College. While president of Middlebury, Thomas oversaw the founding of two of its most prestigious institutions, the Middlebury College Language Schools in 1915 and the Bread Loaf School of English in 1920. In addition, he guided a rapid expansion of Middlebury's main campus from four buildings to nine. McCullough Gymnasium (1912) Voter Hall (1913) Mead Chapel (1914), and Hepburn Hall (1917) formed the edges of what is now Middlebury's Main Quadrangle, and Pearson's Hall (1911) became the first building constructed for the women's college. He continued to serve as Middlebury's president until 1921, when he became President of the Pennsylvania State College (now a University). He left Penn State in 1925.

When Thomas was appointed president in 1925, Rutgers was upgraded from a college to a university. During his tenure, enrollment grew steadily, four year courses in Economics and Business Administration were added to the curriculum, the New Jersey College of Pharmacy was incorporated into the University, and the Bureau of Biochemical and Bacteriology Research was established, in addition to the construction of several new buildings. Thomas resigned in 1930 due to indecisiveness between the state of New Jersey and university officials over the half-private, half-public role of Rutgers. Upon his resignation, Thomas assumed a vice-presidency of the National Life Insurance Company in Montpelier, Vermont, became acting president of Norwich University in 1937, and then its president in 1939.

Thomas died in Rutland, Vermont in 1952 at the age of 82.

== Sources ==
- Who Was Who in America. A component volume of Who's Who in American History (Chicago: A.N. Marquis Co.).

Academic offices
| Preceded by Ezra Brainerd | President of Middlebury College; 1908–1921 | Succeeded by Paul Dwight Moody |
| Preceded by Edwin Erle Sparks | Pennsylvania State University President; 1921 – 1925 | Succeeded by Ralph Dorn Hetzel |
| Preceded by William H. S. Demarest | President of Rutgers University; 1925–1930 | Succeeded by Philip Milledoler Brett |
