= Edwin Erle Sparks =

American academic (1860-1924)

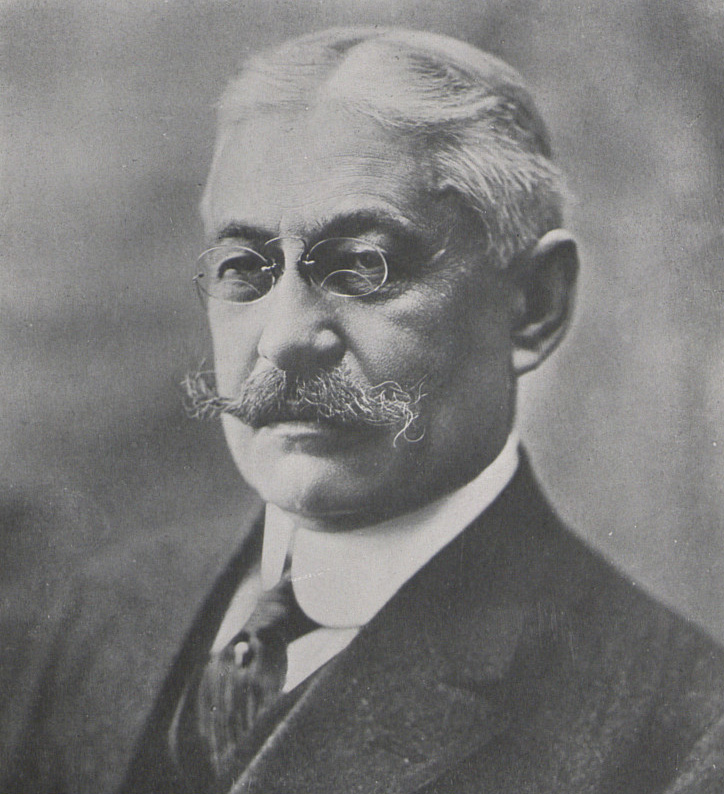
- Sparks pictured in La Vie 1920, Penn State yearbook

8th President of the Pennsylvania State University
- In office 1908–1920
- Preceded by: James A. Beaver
- Succeeded by: John Martin Thomas

Personal details
- Born: July 16, 1860 Newark, Ohio
- Died: June 15, 1924 (aged 63) State College, Pennsylvania
- Education: Ohio State University; University of Chicago

Edwin Erle Sparks (July 16, 1860 – June 15, 1924) was the eighth president of the Pennsylvania State University, serving from 1908 until 1920. The Edwin Erle Sparks Professor of Philosophy is a position at Pennsylvania State University named after him.

== Biography ==
Sparks was born in Newark, Ohio, on July 16, 1860. After high school, he attended Ohio Wesleyan University for two years and the Ohio State University, Class of 1884. He was a Phi Beta Kappa, and received his M.A. from Harvard University, his Ph.D. from the University of Chicago and his LL.D. from Lehigh University. He married Katherine Bullard Cotton on January 1, 1890.

Sparks became a member of the Chi Phi fraternity at Ohio Weslayen and a founder and charter member of the Iota chapter at the Ohio State University. He served as the Grand Gamma (National Secretary) of the fraternity and was also instrumental in bringing Chi Phi to Penn State just before his death in 1924. In his memory, Chi Phi established the Sparks Memorial Medal, presented to the undergraduate member in each chapter who had, during the preceding year, the highest grade point average.

Academic offices
Preceded by James A. Beaver	Pennsylvania State University President; 1908 – 1921	Succeeded by John Martin Thomas
