= William Henry Allen (academician) =

2nd President of the Pennsylvania State University
- In office 1864–1866
- Preceded by: Evan Pugh
- Succeeded by: John Fraser

Personal details
- Born: March 27, 1808 Readfield, Maine, US
- Died: August 29, 1882 (aged 74) Philadelphia, Pennsylvania, US
- Education: Bowdoin College

William Henry Allen (March 27, 1808 – August 29, 1882) was an American professor and academic administrator. A graduate of Bowdoin College, he served as acting president of Dickinson College from 1847 until 1848, and later was selected as the second president of the Pennsylvania State University, serving from 1864 until 1866. He was elected to the American Philosophical Society in 1858.

Academic offices
Preceded by Evan Pugh	Pennsylvania State University President; 1864 – 1866	Succeeded by John Fraser
