= George W. Atherton =

American educator (1837–1906)

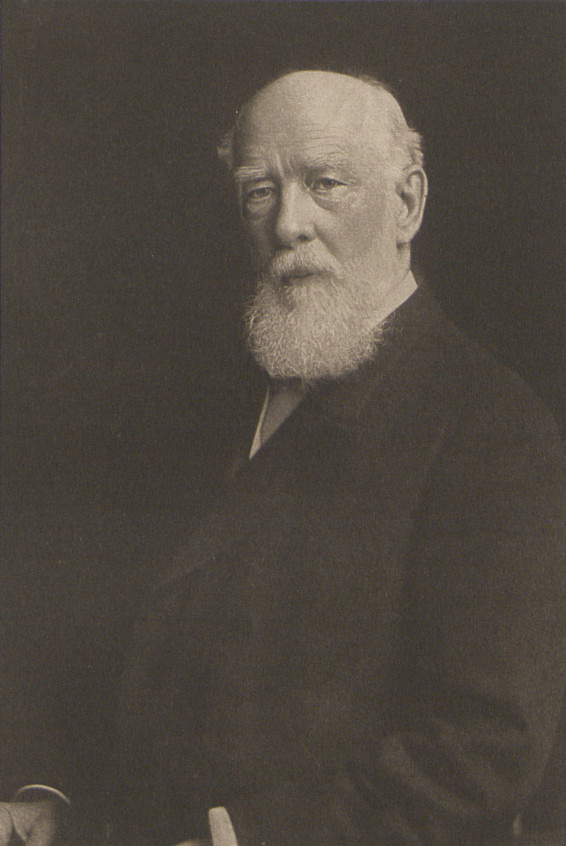
- Atherton pictured in La Vie 1908, Penn State yearbook

7th President of the Pennsylvania State University
- In office 1882–1906
- Preceded by: James Y. McKee
- Succeeded by: James A. Beaver

Personal details
- Born: June 20, 1837 Boxford, Massachusetts, US
- Died: July 24, 1906 (aged 69) State College, Pennsylvania, US
- Spouse: Frances W. Atherton
- Education: Yale University

George Washington Atherton (June 20, 1837 – July 24, 1906), soldier and educator. He was president of the Pennsylvania State University from 1882 until his death in 1906.

== Early life ==
He was the son of Hiram Atherton (1812–1849) and Almira Gardner. His father died when he was 12 years old and he worked on a farm and in a cotton mill to support his mother. He is a direct descendant of James Atherton, one of the First Settlers of New England; who arrived in Dorchester, Massachusetts in the 1630s.

== Military service ==
Atherton enlisted in 1861 and fought on the Union side in the Civil War, reaching the rank of captain in the 10th Regiment Connecticut Volunteer Infantry. He remained in command of his company through the Battle of Roanoke Island and the Battle of New Bern. He was discharged in June 1863 with a health condition.

== Education ==
He attended Topsfield Academy in Massachusetts, followed by Philips Exeter Academy, and graduated from Yale in 1863.

== Academic career ==
Atherton began his teaching career at The Albany Academy in Albany, New York., moving onto the University of Illinois. He then accepted a position as a political science professor at Rutgers University. While at Rutgers, he was initiated as an honorary member of Delta Upsilon fraternity by the Rutgers Chapter. Prior to accepting the position of president at Penn State. There, he was faced with the challenge of transforming the school from an unrecognized agricultural college into a respected land-grant college. During his tenure, the school's graduating class increased from seven in 1882 to 86 in 1906.

His 24-year tenure at Penn State began in 1882. During the early 1900s, Atherton's health began to deteriorate, and he died on July 26, 1906. He was acclaimed as a visionary by Benjamin Gill, the dean of the School of Language and Literature, for seeing "from the first not the college that was, but the college that was to be". While Penn State's reputation was still not outstanding, Atherton had succeeded in rescuing the school from negligence by the state government and converted it into an institution of technical education.

== Memberships and Associations ==
He was a member of the Labor Commission resulting from the passage of the Hoar Bill in 1871 and was a member of the Board of Visitors at the U.S. Naval Academy between 1873-1891. See Guide to the George W. Atherton Papers.

== Political Aspirations ==
In 1876 he was Chairman of the Republican State Convention in New Jersey. He was subsequently an unsuccessful in his candidacy for U.S. Congress. He also had diplomatic aspirations, and efforts were made to obtain a U.S. diplomatic post in South America. See Guide to the George W. Atherton Papers.

== President of Penn State ==
Atherton was elected unanimously by the board of trustees on June 22, 1882, to be the seventh president of Penn State, then called the Pennsylvania State College. As he took the position, the government of Pennsylvania was skeptical of the institution and disinclined to grant it appropriations, in spite of the school's status as the state's only land-grant university. To improve the institution's image, Atherton supported a public relations campaign designed to accurately project the school's purpose. He argued that the college should become a school of technology, in keeping with the Morrill Land-Grant Colleges Act, as opposed to being dominated by agricultural and classical studies. This position was not held by Governor Robert E. Pattison, as he maintained that the school should not stray from its origins in agricultural education. Pattison's proposal to reorganize the college and make it exclusively agricultural was rejected by the board of trustees in 1884, giving Atherton the chance to continue in his mission of providing a technical education at a low cost that would strengthen Pennsylvania's position as one of the country's leading industrial states.

Undeterred by Governor Robert E. Pattison, he came across an article about a congressional bill introduced by an Iowa representative. Atherton's efforts over the next four years yielded the Hatch Agricultural Experiment Station Act.

Atherton began by strengthening the university's engineering and mechanical arts programs, asking Louis E. Reber to survey similar programs at other institutions and make improvements to Penn State's curriculum. In 1887, as a result of a significant increase in enrollment at the school, Atherton obtained the school's first appropriation in nearly a decade from the Pennsylvania general assembly for the construction of more buildings. Further funding in 1889 and 1891 reflected Atherton's success in improving the institution's image among the legislature and the general public. By 1893, over two-thirds of the school's 181 students were studying engineering disciplines, while very few studied agriculture, a fact that Atherton attributed to the industrialization of Pennsylvania. By 1900, the university's engineering program was ranked tenth in the country by number of students enrolled.

He asked to be relieved of his post in 1905, however remained president until his death the following year.

=== Curricular changes ===
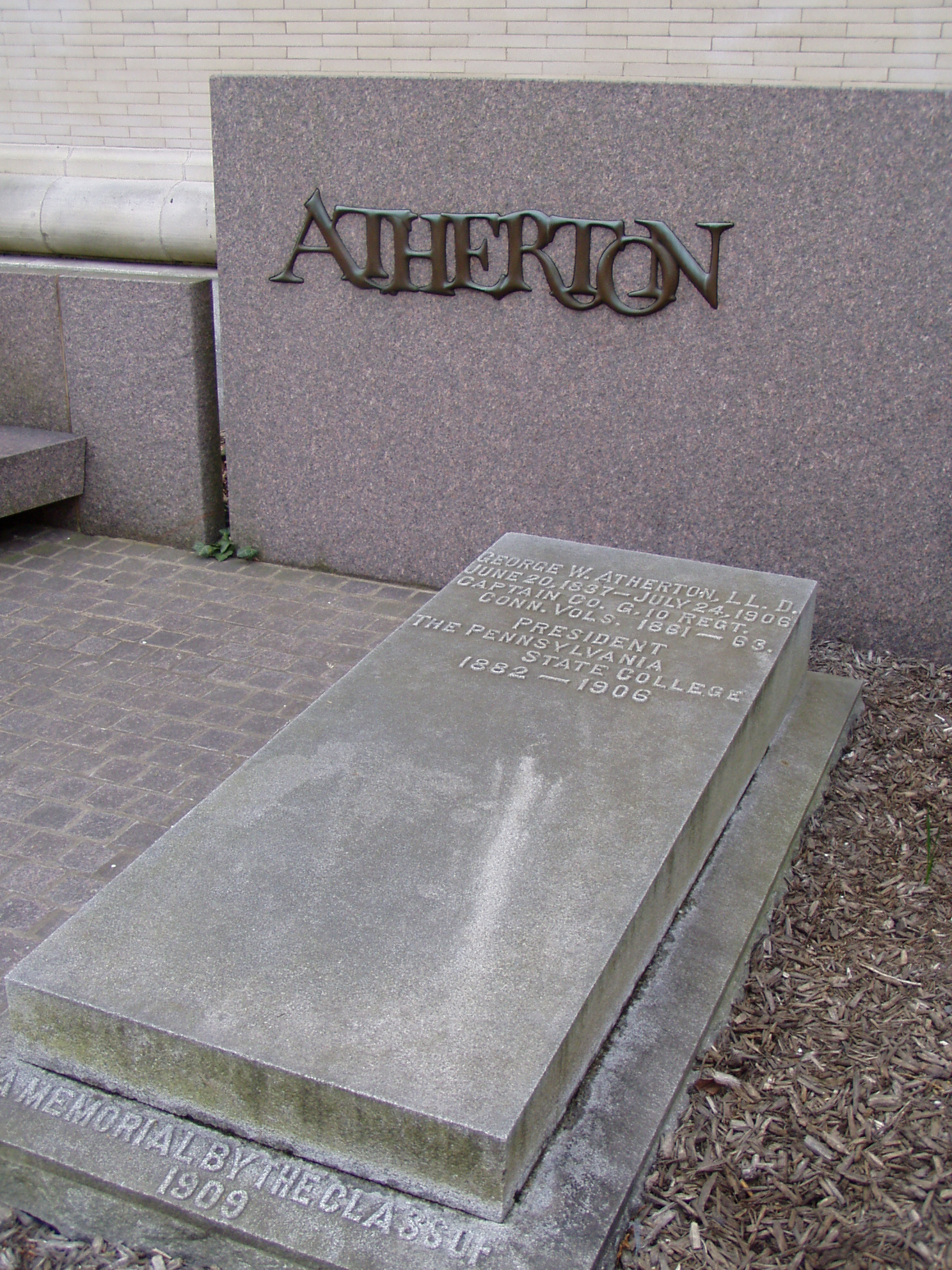
Atherton's grave, on the campus of Penn State

Atherton did much to strengthen other areas of the curriculum, supporting improvement of the liberal arts education around the start of the 20th century. Programs in ancient languages and philosophy were created during those years, though few students took advantage of them. He supported the expansion of the library, which in 1899 benefited from a gift from Andrew Carnegie after the general assembly refused to provide the necessary funding.

Atherton proposed a number of curricular changes, including the grouping of similar disciplines into seven colleges in 1895. This allowed greater coordination between programs and added deans as an additional level of authority between departments and the university president. He oversaw the development of several other less formal programs of study, such as short courses in technical and agricultural subjects, correspondence courses, and summer school. As a result of these reforms, enrollment in the school increased to 800 by the time of his death, with the majority of students studying in baccalaureate degree programs. This presented a financial strain on the school since the size of appropriations was reduced due to government budgetary constraints.

=== Student life under Atherton ===
Under Atherton, extracurricular activities among students expanded dramatically, and athletic programs began to take shape. In 1892, Atherton hired a director of physical training and approved the construction of Beaver Field. During those years, a student news publication, The Free Lance, was founded, and the first yearbook was published. The Blue Band was organized in 1899, and theatre and music groups were founded as well.

Atherton maintained an atmosphere of discipline among the student body, requiring class attendance and the military training of all male students in the institution. Room inspections and artillery drills were common, as a result of provisions in the Morril land grant act. Even so, Atherton remained popular with the student body, as he was known for giving students a fair hearing. In 1888 he approved the foundation of the university's first fraternities, and made changes to the school schedule in accordance with student wishes.

== Legacy ==
Since 1978, the George W. Atherton Award for Excellence in Teaching, is presented to four faculty members who have devoted substantial effort to undergraduate teaching on an annual basis.

== Personal ==
He married Frances "Fannie" Wright Darusmont Washburn, of Plympton, Massachusetts in New Haven on Dec 25, 1863. They had six children. Their second son was the composer, Frank Peabody Atherton (1868–1911). Their youngest son was Charles Morgan Herbert Atherton (1874–1934), known professional as Charlie Atherton, who became a Major League Baseball third baseman. Nicknamed "Prexy", batted and threw right-handed, was 5 ft 10 in (1.78 m) tall and weighed 160 pounds.

Atherton died in Harrisburg, PA in 1906.

He is buried on the campus of Penn State, next to Schwab Auditorium, near Old Main, on Pollock Road which cuts directly through the campus in University Park, Pennsylvania.

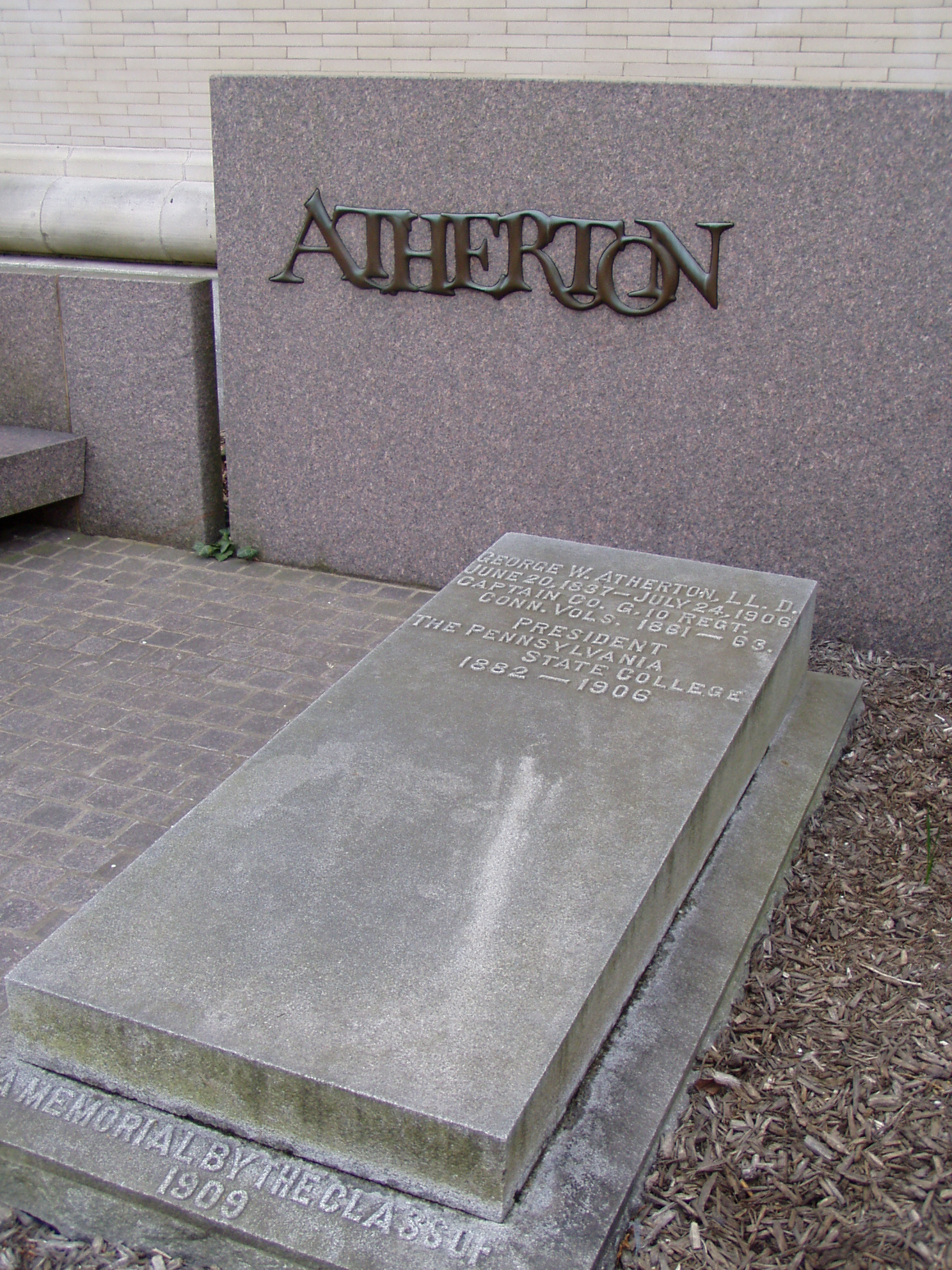

== See also ==
- History of the Pennsylvania State University
- Atherton Hall

== Articles ==
- Atherton's impact on Penn State

Academic offices
| Preceded by James Y. McKee | Pennsylvania State University President; 1882 – 1906 | Succeeded by James A. Beaver |
