= Milton S. Eisenhower =

American university president (1899–1985)

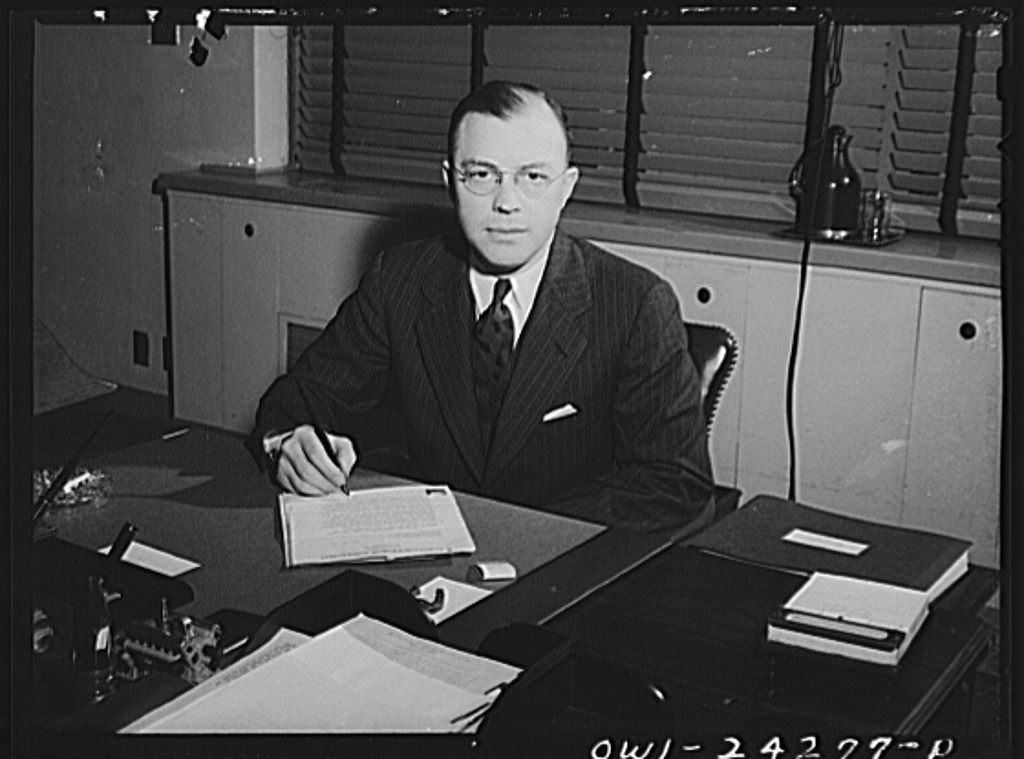
- Eisenhower in 1943

8th and 10th President of Johns Hopkins University
- In office 1971–1972
- Preceded by: Lincoln Gordon
- Succeeded by: Steven Muller
- In office 1956–1967
- Preceded by: Lowell Reed
- Succeeded by: Lincoln Gordon

11th President of Pennsylvania State University
- In office 1950–1956
- Preceded by: James Milholland (acting)
- Succeeded by: Eric A. Walker

9th President of Kansas State University
- In office 1943–1950
- Preceded by: Francis Farrell
- Succeeded by: James McCain

Director of the War Relocation Authority
- In office March 18, 1942 – June 18, 1942
- Preceded by: Position created
- Succeeded by: Dillon S. Myer

Personal details
- Born: Milton Stover Eisenhower; September 15, 1899 Abilene, Kansas, U.S.
- Died: May 2, 1985 (aged 85) Baltimore, Maryland, U.S.
- Spouse: Helen Eakin (m. 1927; died 1954)
- Children: 2
- Relatives: Dwight D. Eisenhower (brother)
- Education: Kansas State University (B.S.)

Milton Stover Eisenhower (September 15, 1899 – May 2, 1985) was an American academic administrator. He served as president of three major American universities: Kansas State University, Pennsylvania State University, and Johns Hopkins University. Eisenhower was also the head of the U.S. delegation to the United Nations Educational, Scientific and Cultural Organization (UNESCO). He was the youngest brother of, and advisor to, U.S. president Dwight D. Eisenhower.

== Early life and education ==
He was born in Abilene, Kansas, as the seventh boy to Ida Elizabeth Stover (1862–1946) and David Jacob Eisenhower (1863–1942); the family was poor. His mother had wanted a girl, and so she treated young Milton as female until, according to the family, it became embarrassing. Eisenhower attended public schools and graduated from Kansas State University, where he was a member of the Kansas Beta chapter of Sigma Alpha Epsilon, in 1924 with a Bachelor of Science degree in industrial journalism.

== Career ==
After graduating from Kansas State, Eisenhower was assistant to the American consul in Dunfermline, Scotland, from 1924 to 1926.

=== U.S. Department of Agriculture ===
Eisenhower served as Director of Information for the U.S. Department of Agriculture from 1928 to 1941, where he was a spokesman for the New Deal under Henry A. Wallace. Previously he had been secretary to the Secretary of Agriculture William Marion Jardine, since September 1926 who had also been the college president while he was an undergraduate at Kansas State. He also was a key member of the Department of Agriculture's Employee Organization, the Organization of Professional Employees of the United States Department of Agriculture (OPEDA).

=== World War II ===
Early in 1942, he was appointed director of the War Relocation Authority, the U.S. government agency responsible for the relocation and internment of Japanese Americans during World War II. Eisenhower was opposed to the mass incarceration, and at initial meetings with pro-exclusion officials he suggested allowing women and children to remain on the West Coast, but the proposal was rejected. In his position as WRA director, he attempted to mitigate the consequences of the "evacuation," establishing a Japanese American advisory council with Mike Masaoka, a work program that allowed some Japanese Americans to leave camp for employment on labor-starved farms, and a student leave program that allowed Nisei who had been enrolled in college to continue their education. He also tried to get the Federal Reserve Bank to protect the property that Japanese Americans were forced to leave behind, and to convince governors of states outside the exclusion zone to allow Japanese Americans to resettle there, but these efforts were largely unsuccessful.

In the 1943 government propaganda film, Japanese Relocation he said, "This picture tells how the mass migration was accomplished. Neither the Army, nor the War Relocation Authority relish the idea of taking men, women and children from their homes, their shops and their farms. So, the military and civilian agencies alike determined to do the job as a democracy should – with real consideration for the people involved." Eisenhower resigned after only ninety days, and from June 1942 to mid-1943 he was associate director of the Office of War Information.

=== College administrator ===
In May 1943, Eisenhower became President of Kansas State University (his alma mater), a position he held until 1950. During this time, he also served as the first Chairman of the U.S. National Commission for UNESCO. In this role, Eisenhower sought to also establish a UNESCO commissions for each state. He personally organized the first such commission, in Kansas. As head of the U.S. delegation to UNESCO, Eisenhower appealed to the people of the United States to "send aid at once to the refugees of the Palestine war in the Middle East." He had seen "the sea of suffering humanity" and appealed to Americans to send clothing, food, and money to relieve the refugees. He warned in December 1948 that "If aid is not given to these unfortunate people, thousands of them are going to be freezing to death and dying of hunger and malnutrition. They nearly all are Arabs." Eisenhower also sought to create more opportunity for African Americans at Kansas State, pushing for the racial integration of the Big Seven Conference (later Big Eight Conference) in 1949.

Eisenhower was often referred to as "Doctor." However, he did not hold an earned doctoral degree; instead, he had received an honorary doctorate of humane letters from the University of Nebraska in 1949. After leaving Kansas State University in 1950, Eisenhower served as president at two other universities: Pennsylvania State University from 1950 to 1956 and Johns Hopkins University from 1956 to 1967 and 1971 to 1972.

In July 1956, Milton Eisenhower assumed the presidency of Johns Hopkins University, succeeding Lowell J. Reed. During Eisenhower's first term, University income tripled and the endowment doubled. More than $76 million in new buildings were constructed, including the Milton S. Eisenhower Library, completed in 1964 and named for Eisenhower in 1965. Respected and admired by faculty and students alike, Eisenhower was arguably the most popular Hopkins president since Daniel Coit Gilman. He kept office hours when any student could drop in, and he was welcome at students' off-campus parties.

When Eisenhower retired in 1967, he was given the title president emeritus in recognition of his service. In March 1971, after Lincoln Gordon's abrupt resignation, the trustees asked Eisenhower to return until a permanent successor could be found. He reluctantly agreed to return, making it clear that the search for a permanent successor must begin immediately. His second administration, lasting ten months, required him to reduce a large deficit and slow the growth of the University's administration. His reputation for fairness helped greatly in that turbulent time, and, despite the budgetary problems, he was able to push forward with planning and design for a new student center. In January 1972, he was succeeded as president by Steven Muller, who (although hired by Lincoln Gordon) had served a ten-month "apprenticeship" under Eisenhower as vice president and provost. Eisenhower enjoyed a second active retirement until his death on May 2, 1985.

=== Political career ===
In 1956 during the re-election campaign of his brother Dwight, Milton's influence over Latin American foreign policy became a campaign issue. Democratic nominee Adlai Stevenson II claimed that Milton exerted undue influence over Latin American policy with the State Department, a claim which was denied by John Foster Dulles.

He served as a presidential adviser in the administrations of his brother Dwight D. Eisenhower (1953–1961), John F. Kennedy (1961–1963) and Lyndon B. Johnson (1963–1969). In 1968, he was appointed chairman of the National Commission on the Causes and Prevention of Violence by President Johnson.

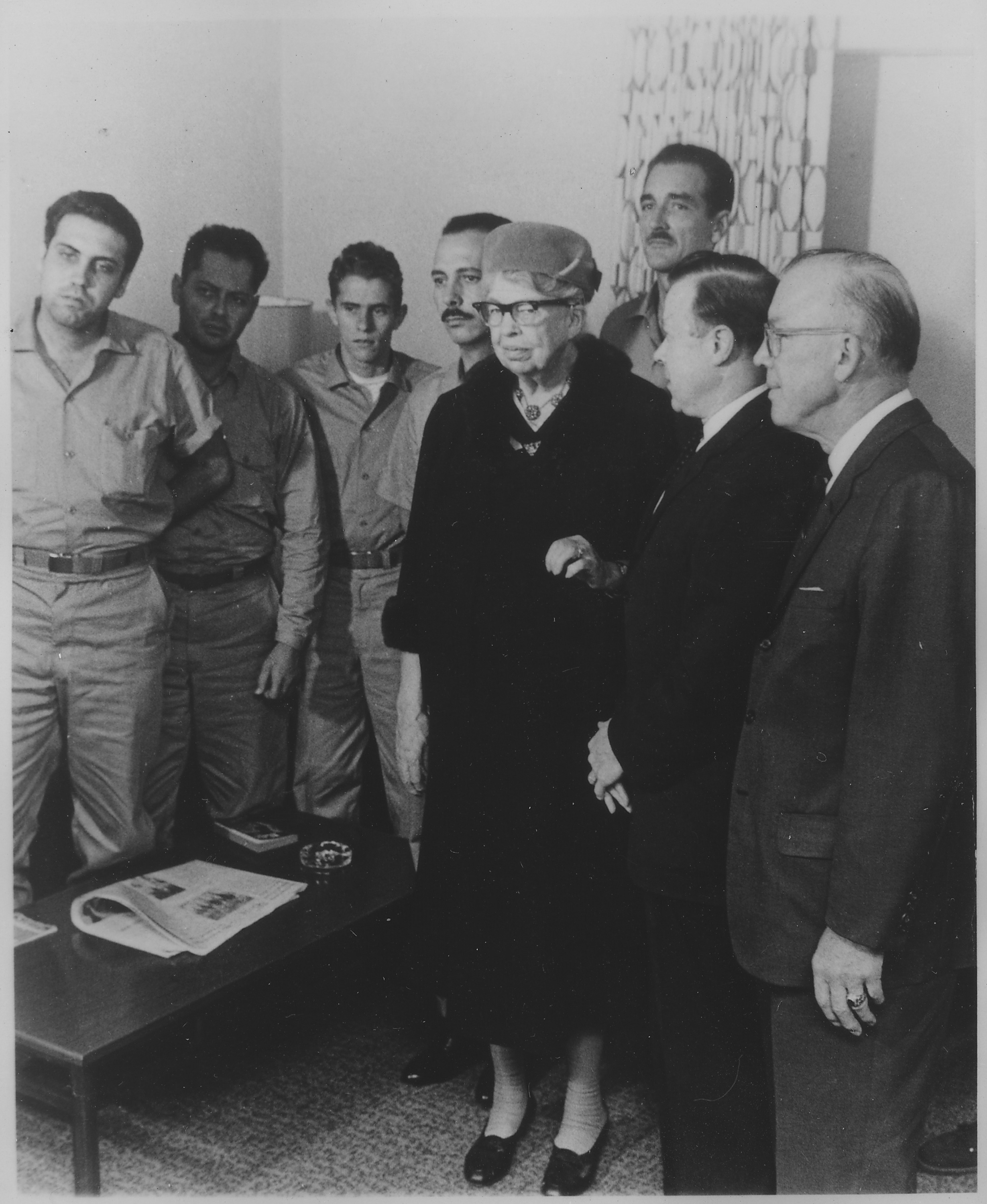
Milton Eisenhower, Eleanor Roosevelt, Walter Reuther, and the Cuban prisoner exchange delegation in Washington, D.C.

Following the Bay of Pigs in 1961, President Kennedy asked Eisenhower, Eleanor Roosevelt, and labor leader Walter Reuther to negotiate the release of captured Americans with Cuban leader Fidel Castro.

In 1963 Eisenhower published The Wine is Bitter: The United States and Latin America, his reminiscences and evaluation of U.S. relations in that region.

In 1964 Milton Eisenhower was lightly considered and named by brother Dwight as a potential candidate for President of the United States, opposing the forces behind eventual nominee Barry Goldwater.

In 1980, Eisenhower appeared on the ballot in Texas as the running mate of Representative John B. Anderson, Independent candidate for U.S. President.

== Personal life ==
On October 12, 1927, Eisenhower married Helen Elsie Eakin (1904–1954), with whom he had a son, Milton Stover Eisenhower, Jr. (1930–2002), and a daughter, Ruth Eakin Eisenhower (1938–1984).

While attending college at Kansas State University, Eisenhower was a member of the fraternities Delta Sigma Pi, Phi Kappa Phi, Sigma Alpha Epsilon and Sigma Delta Chi. He was also the editor of the campus newspaper, the Collegian. In 1978, he became a member of the Kansas Society Sons of the American Revolution.

Eisenhower died of cancer in Baltimore, Maryland, on May 2, 1985.

== Legacy ==
- The Milton S. Eisenhower Library of Johns Hopkins University, opened in 1964 and containing 2.5 million volumes, is named after him. It has the unusual feature of being almost entirely underground (because of the slope of the site where it was built). The south wall is entirely windows.
- The primary research facility at the Johns Hopkins University Applied Physics Laboratory was previously named the Milton S. Eisenhower Research Center (now the Research and Exploratory Development Department).
- The Milton S. Eisenhower Auditorium, a 2,595-seat center for the performing arts on the University Park campus of Penn State, opened in 1974. Eisenhower Chapel, on the same campus, is named for his wife, Helen Eakin Eisenhower.
- Eisenhower Hall, opened in 1951 on the Kansas State campus, is also named in his honor. It is home to the College of Arts and Sciences dean's office and the departments of History and Modern Languages. (Not to be confused with the Eisenhower Hall at West Point.)

The Milton S. Eisenhower Symposium is an acclaimed, student-organized lecture series founded in 1967 at Johns Hopkins University. All events take place on the Homewood campus in Shriver Hall and are free and open to the public.
