= Ralph D. Hetzel =

Tenth president of Penn State University

Ralph Dorn Hetzel
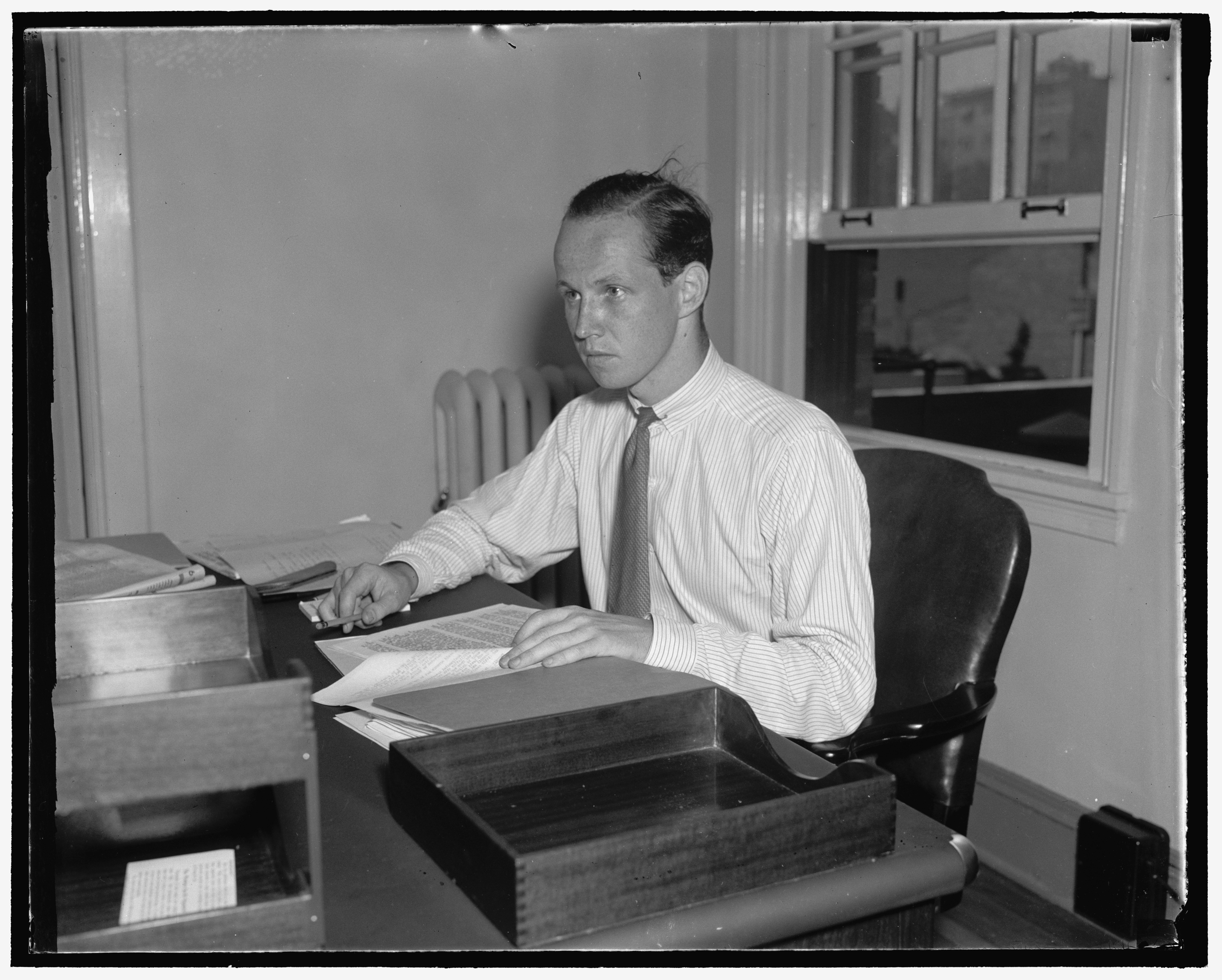

4th President of New Hampshire College (Now the University of New Hampshire)
- In office 1923–1926
- Preceded by: Edward Thomson Fairchild
- Succeeded by: Edward M. Lewis

10th President of the Pennsylvania State University
- In office 1927–1947
- Preceded by: John Martin Thomas
- Succeeded by: James Milholland

Personal details
- Born: December 31, 1882 Merrill, Wisconsin
- Died: October 3, 1947 (aged 64) University Park, Pennsylvania
- Education: University of Wisconsin–Madison

Ralph Dorn Hetzel (December 31, 1882 – October 3, 1947) was the tenth President of the Pennsylvania State University, serving from 1927 until 1947. Prior to that he served as the President of the New Hampshire College, which became the University of New Hampshire in 1923, under Hetzel's tenure.

It was during Hetzel's presidency that Penn State's football program shifted to the oversight of the university, rather than the Board of Athletic Control, run by alumni at the time. Hugo Bezdek, coach of the football team at the time, was unpopular among influential alumni in the Pittsburgh area. Dissatisfied that Bezdek had been unable to defeat long-time rival University of Pittsburgh, the alumni accepted an agreement that would remove him from the head coaching position in exchange for a transfer of control to the Department of Physical Education, which would be elevated to the status of a school (the present-day College of Health and Human Development).

The Hetzel Union Building (HUB) at Penn State University and Hetzel St. in State College are named for Hetzel.

Hetzel Hall, a dormitory at the University of New Hampshire, is named after him as well.
