= Evan Pugh =

American university president (1828–1864)

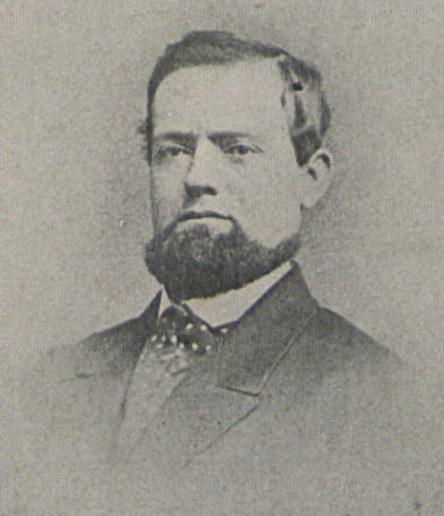

1st President of the Pennsylvania State University
- In office 1859–1864
- Preceded by: Inaugural
- Succeeded by: William Henry Allen

Personal details
- Born: February 29, 1828 Oxford, Pennsylvania
- Died: April 29, 1864 (aged 36) State College, Pennsylvania
- Spouse: Rebecca Valentine Pugh
- Education: University of Göttingen
- Profession: Professor, President of Farmers' High School (Pennsylvania Agricultural College of Pennsylvania), 1859-1864

Evan Pugh (February 29, 1828 – April 29, 1864) was the first president of the Pennsylvania State University, serving from 1859 until his death in 1864.

An agricultural chemist, he was responsible for securing Penn State's designation in 1863 as a land-grant institution under the Morrill Land Grant Act. He was buried in Union Cemetery in Bellefonte, Pennsylvania, along with his wife, Rebecca Valentine Pugh.

== Early life ==
Evan Pugh was born to Lewis and Mary (née Hutton) Pugh on February 29, 1828 near Oxford in Chester County, Pennsylvania. He was the fourth of six children: Rebecca, who died soon after birth (1823), Susan (1824-1913), Elizabeth (1826-1847), Enoch (1830-1854), and John (1832-1834). The family traced their lineage back to Ellis Pugh, a Quaker Welsh settler in William Penn's colony.

They lived on fifty-six acres of land, given to Lewis by his father Jesse, on family property in a stone farmhouse with a barn and blacksmith/wheelwright shop. Shortly after Evan's birth, Lewis was blinded and burned in an accident at the forge. He died in 1840, and his widow sent Evan and Elizabeth to live with their grandfather and three aunts on a neighboring farm.

== Education ==
Pugh was tutored by his aunts in algebra, geometry, geography, history, Latin, and stenography. From 1844 to 1846 he served as a blacksmith's apprentice, but his extensive tutoring and his dislike of his "master" convinced him to pursue higher education. His family agreed and he enrolled at Whitestown Seminary, a manual labor school near Utica, New York. After attending the seminary for a year he returned home to help with the farm and opened the Jordan Bank Academy. Pugh taught classes, including botany, analytical chemistry, geology and mineralogy, on the second floor of the blacksmith shop, and in his personal time conducted chemistry experiments and contributed to farm journals and county newspapers.

== European years ==
After his mother remarried and his brother, Enoch, left for work in Ohio, Pugh decided to sell the family farm to an uncle and use the money earned ($2800) and his savings to travel to Europe. Pugh "determined that he could participate in the field of education if he could advance his own studies," and German universities at the time were leaders in the development of chemistry, particularly in the agricultural fields. He enrolled at the University of Leipzig and studied under Otto Erdmann with a concentration on the chemistry of plant nutrition in 1853. In 1855, he enrolled at University of Göttingen for the spring term and studied advanced analytical, organic, and agricultural chemistry under the tutelage of Friedrich Wöhler. He passed his Ph.D. examinations in 1856 and wrote his dissertation Miscellaneous Chemical Analyses on particular meteoric ores found in Mexico.

In order to further study the effect of atmospheric gases on plant growth, Pugh traveled to Heidelberg University to study under Robert Bunsen. However, the lab was overcrowded and he disliked the politics and repressive nature of the university town. He left to vacation in the Jura Mountains, hiking from Switzerland into France. After arriving in Paris, he became interested in the direct assimilation of free nitrogen in the air by plants due to a controversy between two French scientists. This spurred Pugh to begin his own project in 1857 at the Rothamsted laboratory near London. This research later became Pugh's report On the Sources of Nitrogen of Vegetation, etc.. The report was widely lauded and Pugh was elected a Fellow of the London Chemical Society after presenting the report to the Royal Society in early 1859.

Pugh kept a travel journal and wrote detailed letters home to family and Chester County newspapers throughout his travels in Europe. He also wrote detailed journals of his experiments and class notes. These manuscripts, including modern typescripts of the accounts, are currently housed along with his papers at the Pennsylvania State University Libraries in the Special Collections Library.

== Farmers' High School ==
While Pugh was studying at the Rothamsted laboratory, he communicated with Dr. Alfred L. Elwyn of Chester County, a founder of the Farmers' High School in Centre County, Pennsylvania. Elwyn suggested that he apply for the position and request that the Board allow him a leave of absence to finish his studies in England. In February 1859, Trustee Judge Frederick Watts contacted Pugh and offered him the position of president at the Farmers' High School, as well as a stipend for purchasing laboratory equipment to bring back from Europe. Pugh's appointment officially began in February 1860 during the school's second year, however he assumed most duties as president in October 1859.

Despite the numerous challenges faced by a fledgling college, especially with the Civil War disrupting its formative years, Pugh managed to establish Farmers' High School as a prominent leader in agricultural education and research. His standard duties as president included teaching, advising the 69 enrolled students, acting as disciplinarian, answering letters from parents, ordering books, lobbying in Harrisburg for funding, writing public addresses to garner support, pacifying creditors, and calling meetings of the Trustees. At the end of 1861, 11 students were awarded the first American agricultural college degrees in the Bachelor of Scientific Agriculture after graduating under the direction of Pugh and four other supervising teachers. Not long after, in 1862, Pugh began a graduate program in agricultural chemistry and awarded the first Master of Scientific Agriculture only a year later.

He was elected as a member of the American Philosophical Society in 1862.

== Personal life and death ==
During his visits to discuss mineral composition of the Nittany Valley with notable Bellefonte ironworks master Abram Valentine, Pugh met Abram's daughter. Rebecca and Pugh met frequently to talk about books, German language, and current news, and by early 1863 the two were engaged. In preparation for their marriage, he began designing, hauling stone, and building a house that would later become the president's residence.

The wedding, however, was delayed when both were injured in a carriage accident in June 1863 while returning from visiting William Shortlidge near Bellefonte. Pugh broke his arm and spent the summer and fall in local Philadelphia hospitals having treatments for improper setting of the limb. This injury, along with enormous stress due to General Lee's invasion of Pennsylvania, the already enormous academic and administrative workload for the School, and continuing construction of his house contributed to a weakened immune system unable to fend off an attack of typhoid fever. Pugh collapsed at his desk while penning a statement for Legislature and died a week later on April 29, 1864. Rebecca never remarried, and only visited campus twice after his death: once to present the first graduating class at an alumni reunion with his portrait, and the second time to attend a semi-centennial celebration of Penn State's founding. She died in 1921 and left all of Evan's books, correspondence, and memorabilia to Penn State.

== Evan Pugh Professors ==
In 1960, Pennsylvania State University started the Evan Pugh Professorship program in which the university annually bestows its highest honor to a member of the faculty who "has displayed the courage to pioneer in his or her field, the discipline to remain at the forefront of research, and the generosity of spirit to share these accomplishments with students."

Academic offices
First	Pennsylvania State University President; 1859 – 1864	Succeeded by William Henry Allen
