= Joseph Shortlidge =

6th President of Pennsylvania State University
- In office 1880–1881
- Preceded by: James Calder
- Succeeded by: James Y. McKee

Personal details
- Born: August 1, 1832 New Garden Township, Pennsylvania
- Died: December 10, 1911 (aged 79) Concordville, Pennsylvania

Joseph Shortlidge (August 1, 1832 – December 10, 1911) was the sixth president of the Pennsylvania State University, serving from July 1880 until April 1881.

Academic offices
Preceded by James Calder	Pennsylvania State University President; 1880 – 1881	Succeeded by James Y. McKee
