= James Calder (academic administrator) =

President of Pennsylvania State University (1826–1893)

5th President of the Pennsylvania State University
- In office 1871–1880
- Preceded by: Thomas Henry Burrowes
- Succeeded by: Joseph Shortlidge

President of Hillsdale College
- In office 1869–1871

Personal details
- Born: February 16, 1826 Harrisburg, Pennsylvania, US
- Died: November 22, 1893 (aged 67) Harrisburg, Pennsylvania, US
- Spouse: Ellen Cordelia Winebrenner
- Education: Wesleyan College

James Calder (February 16, 1826 – November 22, 1893) was the third president of Hillsdale College, serving from 1869 to 1871, and the fifth president of the Pennsylvania State University, serving from 1871 until 1880.

Academic offices
Preceded by Thomas Henry Burrowes	Pennsylvania State University President; 1871 – 1880	Succeeded by Joseph Shortlidge
