= John Fraser (academic) =

American soldier and educator

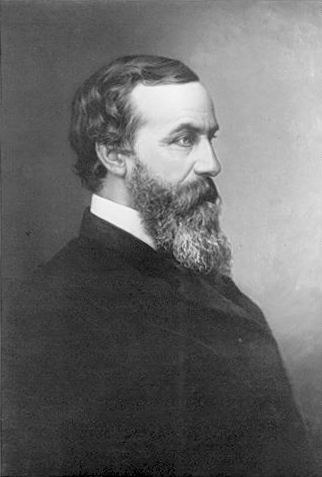

3rd President of the Pennsylvania State University
- In office 1866–1868
- Preceded by: William Henry Allen
- Succeeded by: Thomas Henry Burrowes

Chancellor of the University of Kansas
- In office 1867–1874

Personal details
- Born: March 22, 1827 Cromarty, Scotland, United Kingdom
- Died: June 4, 1878 (aged 50–51) Allegheny, Pennsylvania, United States
- Education: University of Aberdeen

John Fraser (March 22, 1827 – June 4, 1878) was an American soldier and educator. He was the third president of the Pennsylvania State University, serving from 1866 until 1868, and the second Chancellor of the University of Kansas serving from 1867 to 1874.

Fraser was born in Cromarty, Scotland, and studied at Aberdeen University. He graduated with a master's degree in mathematics. He emigrated to Bermuda to teach and then relocated to New York City to take charge of a private school. In 1851, he moved to western Pennsylvania and became professor of mathematics at Jefferson College.

During the American Civil War, he enlisted in the 140th Pennsylvania Infantry in 1862 and rose through the ranks to be the regiment's colonel. He fought at the Battle of Gettysburg in the Wheatfield area, taking charge of the 140th when all the senior officers were incapacitated. He was taken as a prisoner of war during the Siege of Petersburg and incarcerated in Charleston, South Carolina.

In recognition of his service, on January 13, 1866, President Andrew Johnson nominated Fraser for appointment to the grade of brevet brigadier general of volunteers, to rank from March 13, 1865, and the United States Senate confirmed the appointment on March 12, 1866.

== See also ==
- List of American Civil War brevet generals (Union)

== Notes ==
Academic offices
Preceded by William Henry Allen	Pennsylvania State University President; 1866 – 1868	Succeeded by Thomas Henry Burrowes
