= Thomas Henry Burrowes =

American politician

4th President of the Pennsylvania State University
- In office 1868–1871
- Preceded by: John Fraser
- Succeeded by: James Calder

Personal details
- Born: November 16, 1805 Strasburg, Pennsylvania
- Died: February 25, 1871 (aged 65) State College, Pennsylvania
- Education: Yale Law School

Thomas Henry Burrowes (November 16, 1805 – February 25, 1871) was the fourth president of Pennsylvania State University, serving from 1868 until 1871. He also served as Secretary of the Commonwealth of Pennsylvania from 1835 until 1839, the ninth Mayor of Lancaster, Pennsylvania., State Chairman of the Anti-Masonic Party, and Superintendent of Pennsylvania Schools.

== Early life ==
Born on November 16, 1805, in the town of Strasburg, Pennsylvania Thomas Henry Burrowes' parents were natives of Ireland. At the age of five, the Burrowes family moved back to their homeland where he studied under the tutorage of scholars from Trinity College as well as clergymen of the Church of England until he was 12 years old. He continued his education by attending school in New York and studying the classics and eventually attended Yale Law School for only one year and was admitted to the bar in 1829.

== Early career ==
Thomas Henry Burrowes, held a number of important positions including Secretary of the Commonwealth of Pennsylvania, Mayor of Lancaster, Pennsylvania State Chairman of The Anti-Masonic Party, an elected member to the lower house of legislature (Pennsylvania House of Representatives), Superintendent of Schools, founder and editor of the Pennsylvania School Journal (1852-1870), and author of works such as the State Book of Pennsylvania, and Normal School Law, School Law and Decisions.

== Penn State career ==
In October 1868, The Agricultural College of Pennsylvania was looking for new leadership. After being nearly run into the ground by former president John Fraser, the school's student body had dwindled to 20 students, the school was showered in debt and people across the state were losing hope that the agricultural school would survive. The College had been plagued by financial troubles and was in danger of closing its doors. The board of trustees decided to invite important men of the time—including Thomas Henry Burrowes, an individual with much expertise in educational matters for the commonwealth of Pennsylvania—seeking advice in their search for a new President.

Meeting Minutes suggest that Burrowes recommended to, "make the school more practical and less scientific; the president should have administrative ability as well as scientific and literary attainments; and to lower the cost of room and board and tuition as much as possible to attract a wider array of students." At the board's next meeting, they chose Thomas Henry Burrowes to lead the school; he accepted the offer on December 10 with a $1,000 increase in wages, the use of the president's house and grounds and enough feed for two horses and two cows.

Although Burrowes had never worked at a college, his hiring restored faith in the state that the school would thrive. His contemporaries described him saying, "President Burrowes took charge of affairs with his customary confidence, enthusiasm, and vigor, infusing new life and hope into what had seemed to some to be a hopeless cause." He immediately made changes including reestablishing the school's focus as an agricultural school, changing the year's term to run February to December—to better align with the crop cycle, and almost tripling the school's student body from 20 to 59.

Burrowes believed that physical labor would instill pride in the school, and lessen homesickness. He required that men work on maintaining the grounds, building new roads, and working on the farms for their first two years of the Agricultural School's five-year program. In his student's recollections they agree with his philosophy saying that the cleaning of the grounds did instill pride because they were "happy to live in a beautiful garden." However, he did not let the boys work alone and often was seen working on the farm himself. Thomas Henry Burrowes believed that a practical approach to farming was necessary and so created an annual harvest reception called Harvest Home when nearby farmers and alumni could come and learn about new farming techniques and machines. In fact, during the Harvest Home in 1870, a group of alumni decided to form a group to meet every Thursday night and so the Penn State Alumni Association was born.

Thomas Henry Burrowes established close relationships with his students, and often took them on camping, hiking, and fishing trips, feeding them his famous Allegheny Stew. He was noted for his, "genial disposition, ready wit and fine conversational powers." It was one of these trips into the mountains that Thomas Henry Burrowes caught a fatal cold. He died in office, on February 25 at the age of 65.

== Burrowes' landmarks and legacy ==
Buried in St. James Churchyard in Lancaster, a monument was erected over his grave. It reads "He gave his best; his giving was princely; his work has been grandly cumulative and will be so through the ages. To no man now living does Pennsylvania owe so great a debt of gratitude." John Hamilton, a colleague of Thomas Henry Burrowes, eulogized him saying, "He came to this college in the darkest period of its history. The number of students had dwindled to a handful. Public confidence had been withdrawn. The institution had become involved in debt....President Burrowes brought with him the trust of the public, because his had been an educational career that was widely known in PA, both in itself and for the success that had attended it. And although he was not in the 65th year of his age, his enthusiasm and natural vigor seemed just as great as it had been years before. His presence reestablished public confidence, the number of students attracted by his reputation very greatly increased, the course of study was reformed, and the institution was put into practicable working condition. During his administration, the experimental farm at the State College was founded and put into operation.

There can be no doubt of our indebtedness to Dr. Burrowes for most of this that we enjoy today, for it he had not assumed control at the period at which he did, in all probability the college would have ceased to exist."

A road named in his honor travels through the borough of State College and the University Park campus and leads to the Nittany Lion Shrine as well as the Burrowes Building.

Academic offices
Preceded by John Fraser	Pennsylvania State University President; 1868–1871	Succeeded by James Calder
