= James Y. McKee =

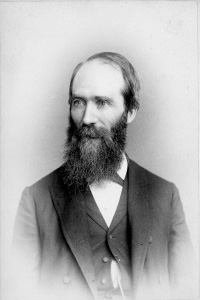

President of the Pennsylvania State University Acting
- In office 1881–1882
- Preceded by: Joseph Shortlidge
- Succeeded by: George W. Atherton

Personal details
- Born: June 20, 1836 Allegheny County, Pennsylvania
- Died: December 24, 1891 (aged 55) Pittsburgh, Pennsylvania

James Y. McKee (June 20, 1836 – December 24, 1891) was acting President of the Pennsylvania State University, serving from the resignation of Joseph Shortlidge in 1881 until 1882.

Academic offices
Preceded by Joseph Shortlidge	Pennsylvania State University President; Interregnum; 1881 – 1882	Succeeded by George W. Atherton
