= List of Middlebury College alumni =

The following is a list of notable Middlebury College alumni, including both graduates and attendees. For a list of Middlebury faculty, refer to the list of Middlebury College faculty.

== Notable alumni ==
Select Middlebury alumni

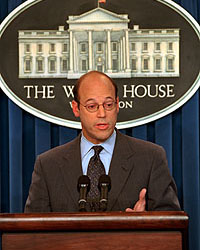
Ari Fleischer, White House Press Secretary for President George W. Bush, class of 1982

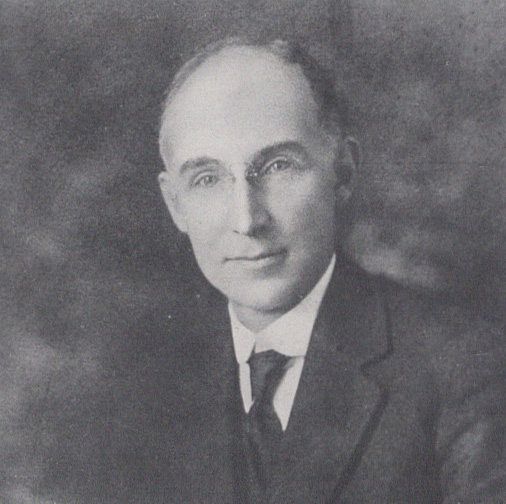
John Martin Thomas, 9th president of Middlebury, 9th president of Penn State, and 12th president of Rutgers University, class of 1890

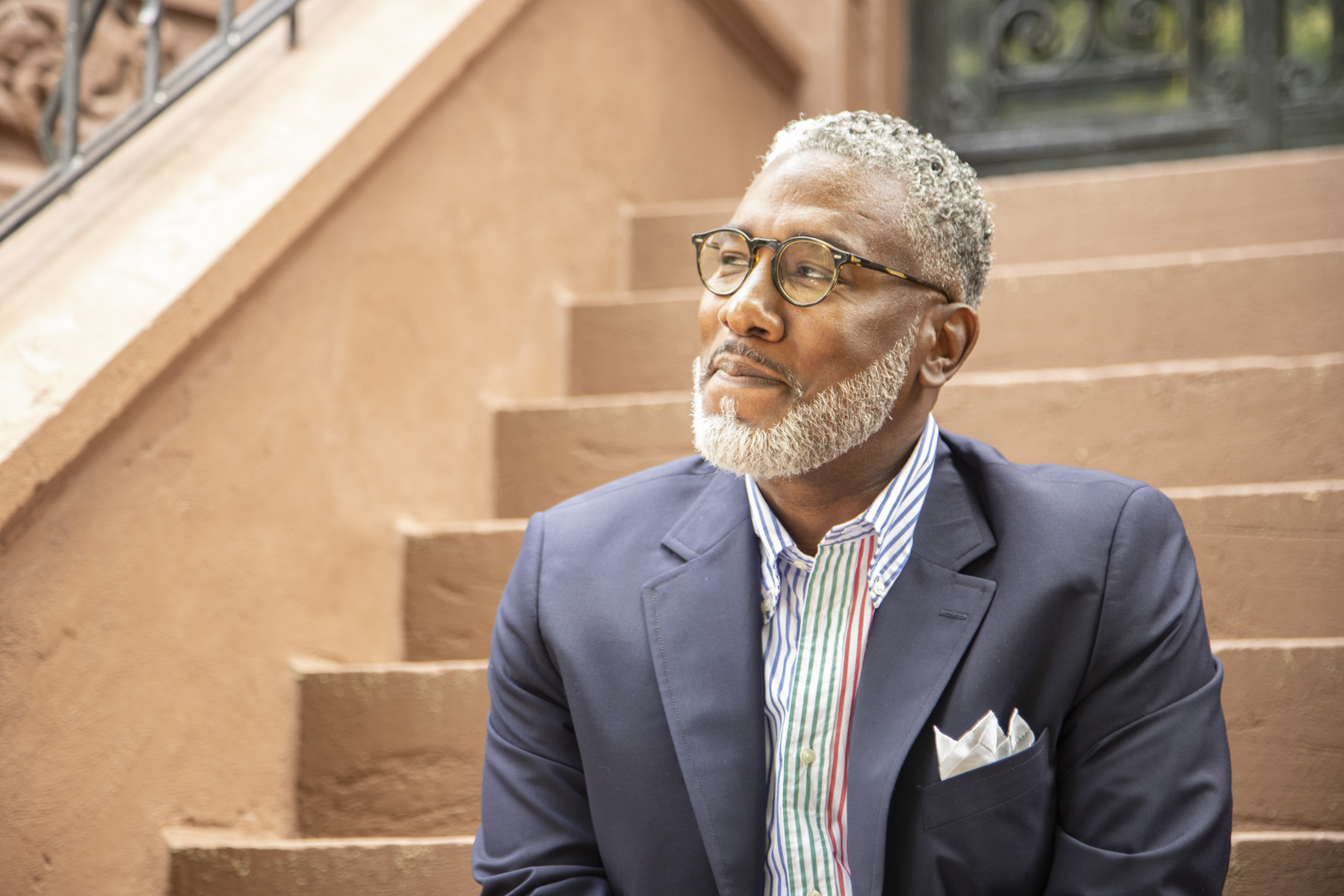
Conrad Tillard, reverend and activist

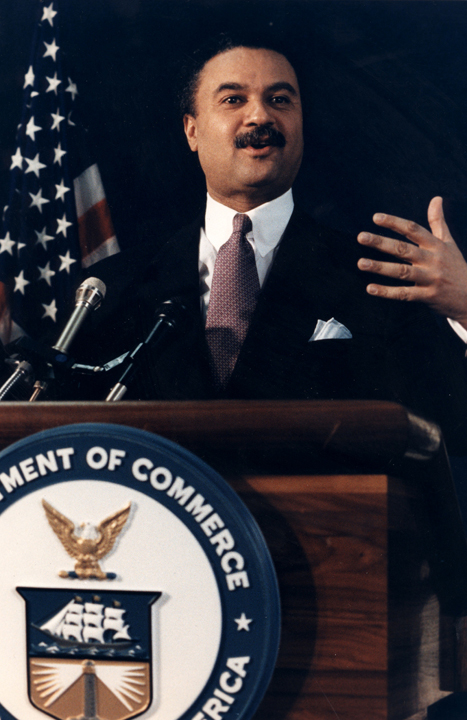
Ronald Harmon Brown, secretary of commerce for President Clinton, class of 1962

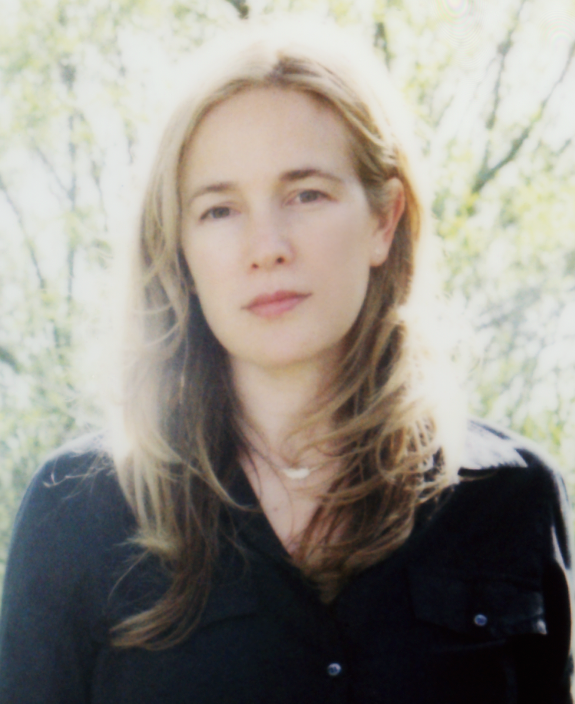
Vendela Vida, novelist, screenwriter, editor of The Believer magazine, and co-founder of 826 Valencia, class of 1993

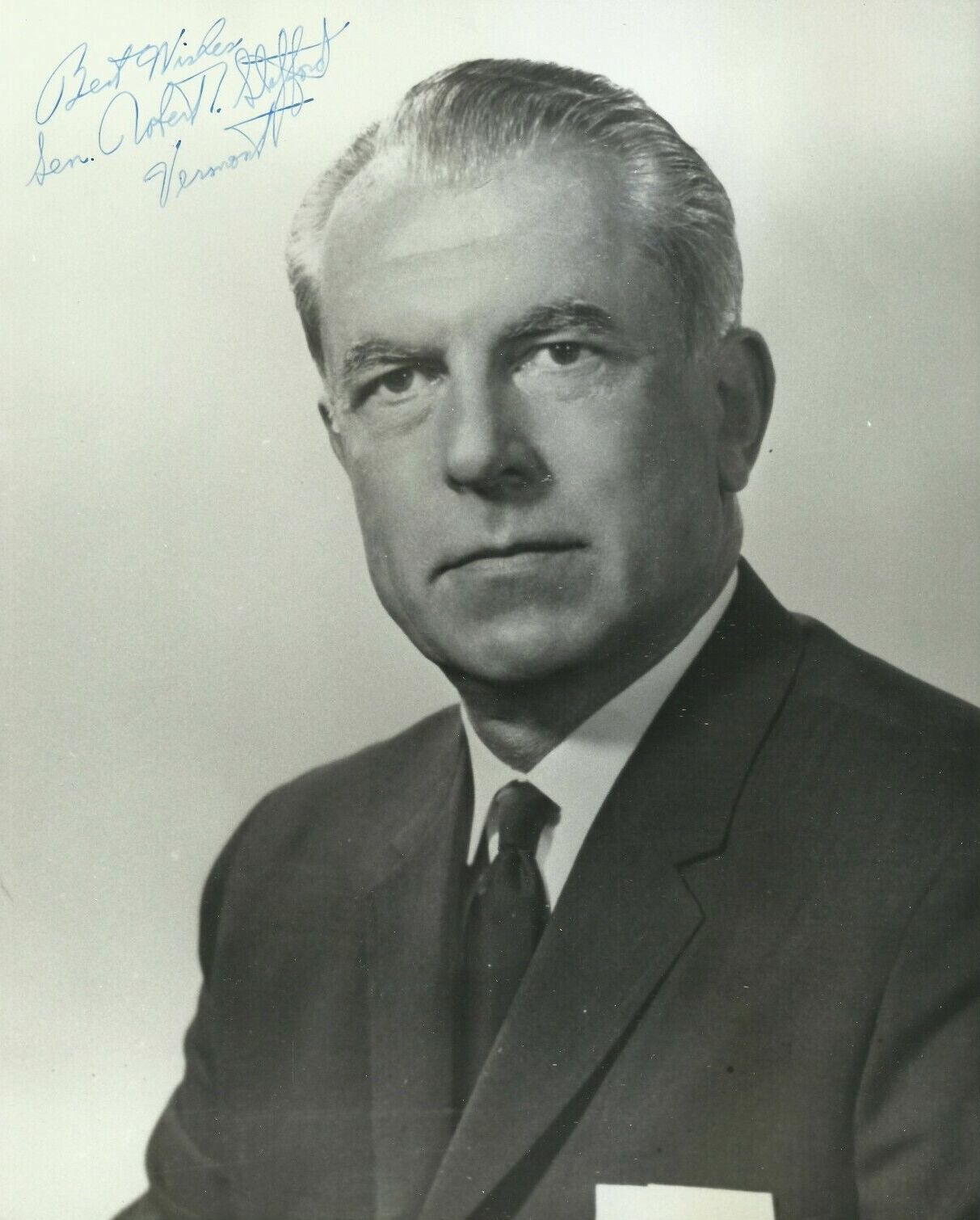
Robert Theodore Stafford, 71st governor of Vermont, U.S. representative, and U.S. senator, class of 1935

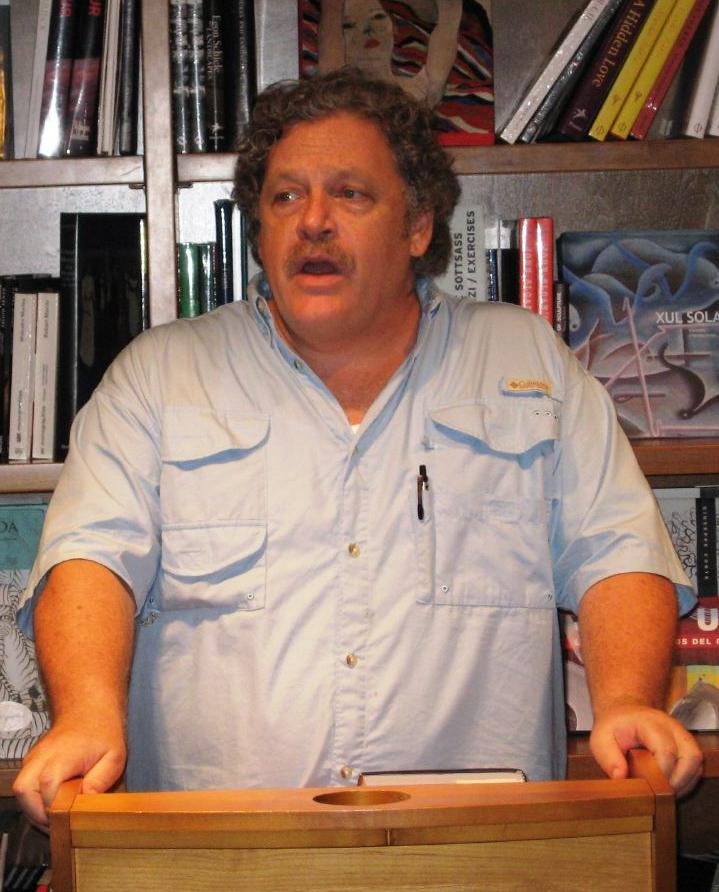
Jeff Lindsay, creator of the Dexter series, class of 1975

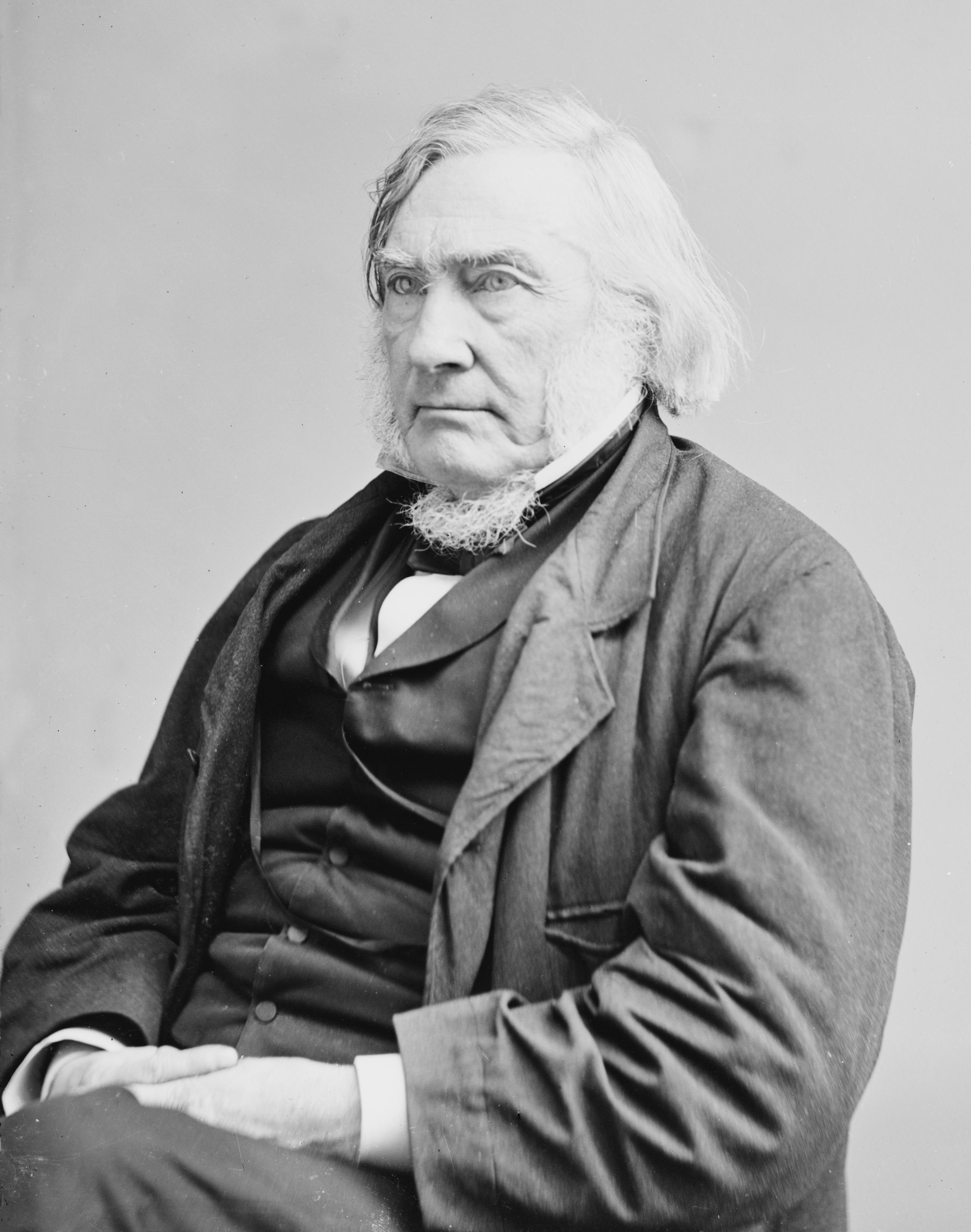
Samuel Nelson, U.S. Supreme Court associate justice, class of 1813

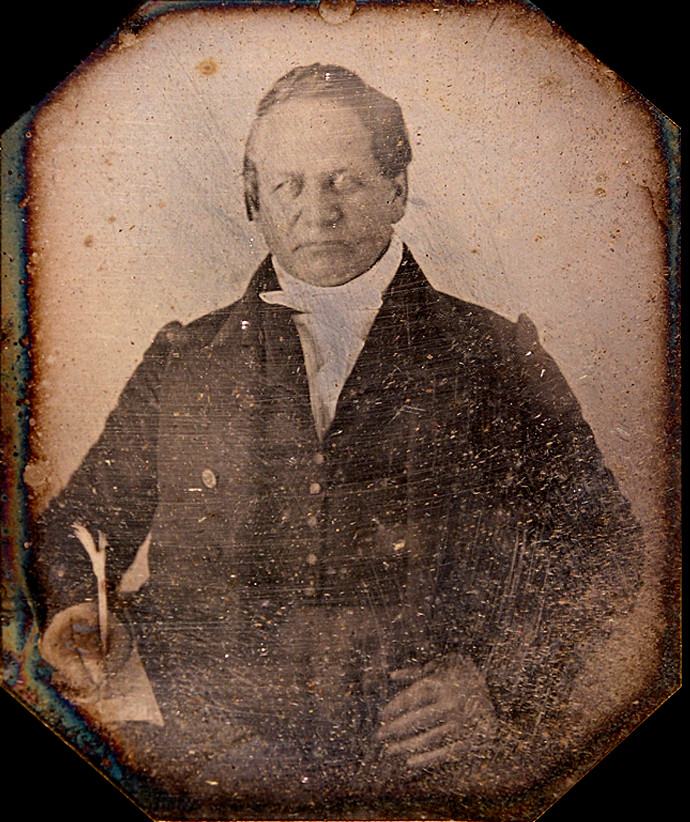
Alexander Twilight, first African-American college graduate and state legislator, class of 1823

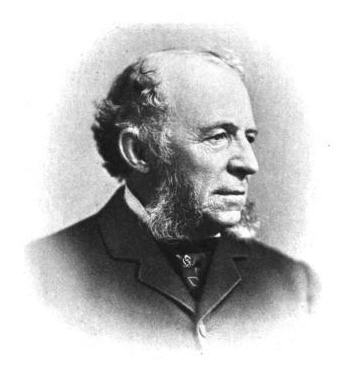
Edward John Phelps, founding member and former president of the American Bar Association, class of 1840

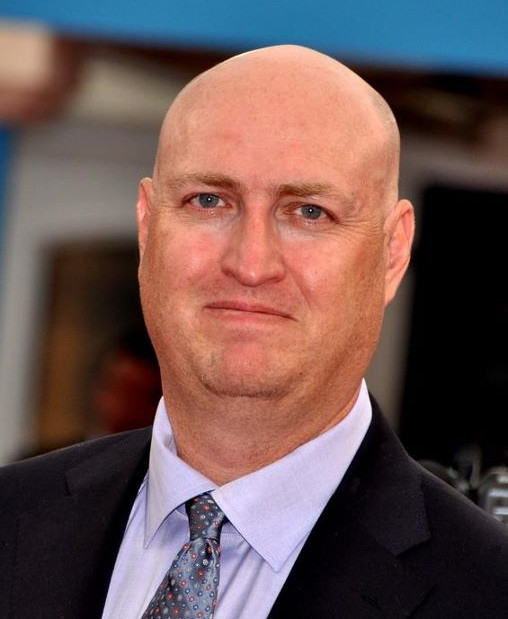
Shawn Ryan, creator of The Shield, class of 1988

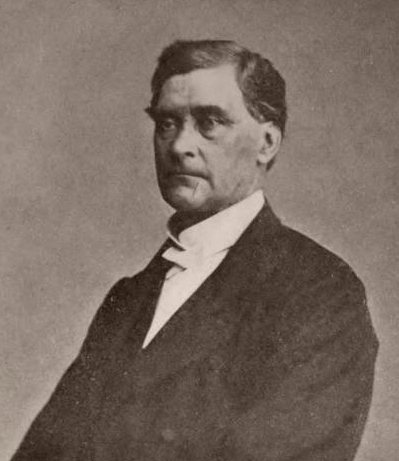
Charles V. Dyer, prominent abolitionist and stationmaster on the Underground Railroad, class of 1830

=== Academia ===
==== College and university presidents ====
- Nathan S.S. Beman 1807 – president of Rensselaer Polytechnic Institute, 1845–1865
- Jonathan Blanchard 1832 – abolitionist and president of Knox and Wheaton Colleges
- Ezra Brainerd 1864 – president of Middlebury College, 1885–1908
- Martin Henry Freeman 1849 – first black president of an American college, later serving as president of Liberia College
- Edward Hitchcock 1846 (DD) – geologist; 3rd president of Amherst College (1845–1854)
- Harvey Denison Kitchel 1835 – Congregationalist minister; president of Middlebury College, 1866–1875
- Joel H. Linsley 1811 – Congregational minister and president of Marietta College
- Carolyn "Biddy" Martin (MA) – 19th president of Amherst College; chancellor of the University of Wisconsin–Madison; provost of Cornell University
- Charles S. Murkland 1884 – first elected president of the New Hampshire College of Agriculture and the Mechanic Arts following the college's move from Hanover to Durham
- Stephen Olin 1820 – educator and minister; first president of Randolph Macon College (1834–1837); president of Wesleyan University (1839–1851)
- John Martin Thomas 1890 – ninth president of Middlebury College, ninth president of Penn State, and twelfth president of Rutgers University

==== Professors ====
- Mary Annette Anderson 1899 – first black woman elected to Phi Beta Kappa; later a professor at Howard University
- John Barlow 1895 – entomologist and college administrator, served 35 years as chairman of the Zoology Department of University of Rhode Island
- Ana Cara 1972 – creolist, translator, and professor of Hispanic Studies at Oberlin College
- Paul O. Carrese 1989 – director of the School of Civic & Economic Thought and Leadership at Arizona State University; author of The Cloaking of Power: Montesquieu, Blackstone, and the Rise of Judicial Activism
- Pamela Chasek 1983 – writer and professor in the Department of Political Science at Manhattan University
- Thomas Jefferson Conant 1823 – Biblical scholar
- Christopher D'Elia 1968 – dean of the College of the Coast & Environment at Louisiana State University
- Edward Diller 1961 (MA) – professor of Germanic Languages and Literature, University of Oregon
- Timothy M. Frye 1986 – chair of the Department of Political Science at Columbia University
- Peter Gries – Harold J. & Ruth Newman Chair in US-China Issues and director of the Institute for U.S.-China Issues at the University of Oklahoma
- Cynthia Huntington 1983 (MA) – poet, professor of English and Creative Writing at Dartmouth College
- Sheila Miyoshi Jager 1985 (MA) – professor of East Asian Studies at Oberlin College
- Edward A. Jones – linguist, scholar and diplomat
- Dan M. Kahan 1986 – Elizabeth K. Dollard Professor of Law at Yale Law School
- Lawrence Kritzman (MA) – scholar, Willard Professor of French, Comparative Literature and Oratory at Dartmouth College
- Jeffrey W. Legro 1982 – political scientist; executive vice president, provost, and professor at the University of Richmond; professor and vice provost for global affairs at the University of Virginia
- Ben Mathes 1981 – professor of Mathematics at Colby College
- Christopher Merrill – poet, essayist, director of the International Writing Program at the University of Iowa
- Martha Merrow 1979 – chronobiologist, director of the Institute of Medical Psychology at LMU Munich
- James Morone 1975 – John Hazen White Professor of Political Science and Public Policy; director of the A. Alfred Taubman Center for American Politics and Policy at Brown University
- Joseph Nevins 1987 – associate professor of Geography at Vassar College
- Avital Ronell 1974 – professor of German, Comparative Literature, and English at New York University
- Stuart B. Schwartz 1962 – George Burton Adams Professor of History at Yale University; chair of the Council of Latin American and Iberian Studies; former Master of Ezra Stiles College
- Suzanna Sherry 1976 – Herman O. Loewenstein Professor of Law at Vanderbilt University Law School
- James Reist Stoner, Jr. 1977 – chair of the Department of Government; professor of political science at Louisiana State University
- Hollis Summers 1943 – poet, novelist, short story writer and editor, professor of English at the University of Kentucky
- Anthony Julian Tamburri – dean of the John D. Calandra Italian American Institute of Queens College, CUNY; professor of Italian & Italian/American Studies
- Enoch Cobb Wines 1827 – minister, prison reformer and professor of Languages at Washington College

=== Activism ===
- Rana Abdelhamid – activist and political candidate from NYC, Harry S. Truman Scholarship recipient
- Conrad Tillard (born 1964) – politician, Baptist minister, radio host, author, and civil rights activist

=== Arts ===
==== Fashion ====
- Tiziana Domínguez – Spanish fashion designer and artist; daughter of designer Adolfo Domínguez
- Alexandra Kotur – fashion journalist, Style Director and contributing editor for Vogue; author of Carolina Herrera: Portrait of a Fashion Icon; co-author of The World in Vogue: People, Parties, Places

==== Fine arts ====
- Peter Gallo 1981 – reclusive artist and writer known for his mixed media works which often combine a variety of unconventional materials
- Robert Gober 1976 – sculptor whose works are exhibited in the Whitney Museum of American Art, the Museum of Modern Art, San Francisco Museum of Modern Art, Solomon R. Guggenheim Museum, the Menil Collection, the Tate Modern and the Hirshhorn Museum and Sculpture Garden
- Alan Gussow 1952 – artist, teacher, author and conservationist inspired by the natural environment
- Alison Knowles (attended) – visual artist known for her soundworks, installations, performances, and publications; was very active in the Fluxus movement, and continues to create work inspired by her Fluxus experience
- Charles Simonton Moffett 1967 – art curator and author
- Nancy Rosen – founded Nancy Rosen Incorporated, an organization which plans and implements public art programs and collections, including the Art-for-Public-Spaces program for the U.S. Holocaust Memorial Museum in Washington, D.C.
- Timothy Rub 1974 – director and CEO of the Philadelphia Museum of Art

==== Literature ====
- John W. Aldridge (summer session 1942) – writer and literary critic, professor of English at the University of Michigan, director of the Hopwood Program, and USIA Special Ambassador to Germany
- Julia Alvarez 1971 – author, poet, and writer-in-residence at Middlebury
- Katherine Arden 2011 – novelist known for Winternight trilogy
- Jane F. Barry 1988 – international women's rights author and principal
- Deni Ellis Béchard (MA) – Canadian-American novelist
- Stacie Cassarino 1997 – poet and author of the collection Zero at the Bone
- Emma Cline – writer and novelist known for The Girls; recipient of the Plimpton Prize
- T Cooper – writer and two-time fellow of the MacDowell Colony
- Marvin Dana (1867–1926) – poet, novelist, and magazine editor
- Frances Frost – poet; novelist; mother of poet Paul Blackburn
- Dwight Garner 1988 – literary critic for The New York Times, former senior editor at the New York Times Book Review
- David Gilbert 1967 – novelist
- Patricia Goedicke 1953 – poet
- Andrew Gross 1974 – author of thriller novels
- Hall J. Kelley 1814 – explorer, settler, and writer; strong advocate for U.S. settlement of the Oregon Country in the 1830s
- Richard E. Kim 1959 – Korean-American writer and professor of literature; author of The Martyred (1964), The Innocent (1968), and Lost Names (1970); Guggenheim Fellow (1966) and was recipient of a Fulbright grant
- Peter Knobler 1968 – author, former editor-in-chief of Crawdaddy magazine
- Jeff Lindsay 1975 – playwright and crime novelist, best known for his novels about sociopathic vigilante Dexter Morgan
- Rebecca Makkai (MA) 2004 – novelist and short-story writer
- Judy Malloy 1964 – poet whose works inhabit the intersection of hypernarrative, magic realism, and information art
- Wesley McNair (MA and M.Litt) – poet, writer, editor, and professor
- Louise McNeill – poet, essayist, and historian of Appalachia
- Emily Mitchell (1997) – Anglo-American novelist
- Wendy Mogel 1973 – speaker and author who looks at parenting problems through the lens of the Torah, the Talmud, and important Jewish teachings
- Jacqueline S. Moore – poet and author of Moments of My Life
- Dan O'Brien – playwright whose plays include The Cherry Sisters Revisited, The Voyage of the Carcass, The Dear Boy, The House in Hydesville, and The Three Christs of Ypsilanti
- Joel Peckham 1992 – poet; scholar of American literature; creative writer
- John Perkins (attended) – activist and author of Confessions of an Economic Hit Man
- Rory Power – author
- Lawrence Raab 1968 – poet
- Lewis Robinson 1993 – writer, author of Officer Friendly and Other Stories
- John Godfrey Saxe 1839 – poet perhaps best known for his retelling of the Indian parable "The Blind Men and the Elephant"
- Johan Theorin (foreign guest student 1985–86) – Swedish journalist and novelist
- Michael Tolkin 1974 – filmmaker and novelist whose screenplays include The Player (1992), which he adapted from his 1988 novel by the same name
- Vendela Vida 1993 – novelist, editor of The Believer magazine
- Anne Walker 1995 – architectural historian and author
- Carol Weston 1979 (MA) – author of fiction and nonfiction books; the "Dear Carol" advice columnist at Girls' Life since the magazine's first issue in 1994

==== Music ====
- Cherine Anderson 2005 – Jamaican actress and dancehall/reggae vocalist
- Maria BC 2019 – ambient musician and singer
- Dispatch 1996 – indie jam band, comprising Chad Urmston, Brad Corrigan, and Pete Heimbold, formed at Middlebury
- Anaïs Mitchell 2004 – folk singer-songwriter and writer of Hadestown
- Oneida 1995 – Brooklyn-based noise rock band co-founded by John Colpitts '95 and Patrick Sullivan '95
- Watermelon Slim (attended) – blues musician, real name Bill Homans
- John Valby 1966 – musician and comedian

==== Television and film ====
- Anna Belknap 1994 – actress, known for her role as Lindsay Monroe on CSI: NY
- Vanessa Branch 1994 – British actress, model, former Miss Vermont, noted for her role in Orbit Gum commercials
- Roscoe Lee Brown (MA) – actor and director, known for his rich voice and dignified bearing
- Jeffrey Bushell 1994 – writer, has written for The Bernie Mac Show, Drawn Together, MADtv, What I Like About You, and Zoey 101
- Kristen Connolly 2002 – actress known for her roles in The Cabin in the Woods and House of Cards
- James Cromwell (attended) – actor noted for his roles in Babe, L.A. Confidential, The Queen, and 24
- Sam Daly 2006 – actor, U.S. production of The Office
- Michaela Dietz 2003 – Korean-American voice actress
- Malaya Drew 1998 – actress known for her roles on The L Word (2008), ER (2006–2007), Las Vegas (2006–2007) and Entourage (2005)
- Lucy Faust – actress and playwright, The Revival, Mudbound and NCIS: New Orleans
- Cassidy Freeman 2005 – actress and singer, known for her role as Tess Mercer in Smallville
- Warren Frost – actor, Twin Peaks, Matlock, The Larry Sanders Show, and Seinfeld
- Justin Haythe 1996 – novelist, short story writer, and screenwriter, screenwriter for The Clearing and the film adaptation of Revolutionary Road
- William Blake Herron 1985 – screenwriter, director, TV creator and show runner, writer-director of A Texas Funeral and co-writer of The Bourne Identity
- Antonio Macia 2000 – screenwriter, writer of Holy Rollers
- Jason Mantzoukas 1995 – comedian, writer, and actor, known for The League and The Dictator
- Emily McLaughlin – soap opera actress
- Amanda Peterson – actress, star of Can't Buy Me Love
- Rodney Rothman 1995 – writer; screenwriter; author of Early Bird; film writer, producer (Forgetting Sarah Marshall and The Year One); television writer (Late Show with David Letterman and Undeclared)
- Shawn Ryan 1988 – creator of the FX television series The Shield and CBS series The Unit
- Jessica St. Clair 1997 – actress and comedian
- Angus Sutherland 2005 – actor, Lost Boys: The Tribe
- Jake Weber 1986 – English actor, known for his role as Michael in Dawn of the Dead, Joe Dubois in Medium, and starring opposite Brad Pitt in Meet Joe Black
- Julia Whelan 2008 – actress, Once and Again
- Jimmy Wong 2009 – actor and musician
- Becky Worley 1992 – journalist; broadcaster; tech contributor for Good Morning America; host and blogger for a web show on Yahoo! Tech

==== Theater ====
- Rob Ackerman – playwright whose plays include Tabletop, which won the 2001 Drama Desk Award for Best Ensemble Performance
- William Burden 1986 – opera singer
- Eve Ensler 1975 – author, playwright, feminist theorist, and peace activist best known for her play The Vagina Monologues
- Rebecca Gilman – playwright
- Dan O'Brien – playwright
- Amanda Plummer (attended) – Tony Award-winning actress

=== Athletics ===
- Nikhil Alleyne – Olympic alpine skier
- Koby Altman 2004 – current general manager of the NBA's Cleveland Cavaliers
- Bob Beattie 1955 – head coach of the U.S. Ski Team 1961–1969, co-founded the Alpine Skiing World Cup
- Hedda Berntsen 1999 – Norwegian world champion skier and 2010 Olympic silver medalist
- John Bower – Nordic combined skier who competed in the 1960s and later went on to become a coach of the American Nordic skiing team for the 1976 and 1980 Winter Olympic team
- H. Adams Carter 1947 (MA) – mountaineer and language teacher
- Chris Cheng (MIIS) 2006 – sport shooter
- Lea Davison 2005 – cross-country mountain biker, member of the U.S. Olympic Team at the 2012 and 2016 Summer Olympics
- Dorcas Denhartog 1987 – Nordic skier who competed at the 1988, 1992, and 1994 Winter Olympic Games
- Ray Fisher 1910 – Major League baseball player who pitched for the New York Yankees and Cincinnati Reds
- Sarah Groff 2004 – triathlete, 2007 ITU Aquathlon World Champion and member of the U.S. 2012 Summer Olympic Team
- Megan Guarnier 2007 – cyclist, winner of 2016 UCI Women's World Tour and 2016 Giro d'Italia Femminile, and member of the U.S. 2016 Summer Olympic Team
- Stone Hallquist – football running back, played for Milwaukee Badgers in National Football League
- Simi Hamilton 2009 – cross-country skier who has competed since 2000, member of the U.S. 2010 Olympic Cross-Country Ski Team
- Steve Hauschka 2007 – NFL placekicker for eight teams
- John W. Hollister (attended) – football player and coach, football coach at Beloit College
- Peter Holmes à Court 1990 – Australian businessman, joint owner of the National Rugby League team South Sydney Rabbitohs together with Russell Crowe; son of the late billionaire businessman Robert Holmes à Court
- Thomas M. Jacobs – Olympic Nordic skier who competed in the 1950s
- Andrew Johnson – member of the U.S. 2006 Olympic Cross-Country Ski team
- Ted King 2005 – cyclist
- Bill Kuharich 1976 – vice president of player personnel for the Kansas City Chiefs
- Garrott Kuzzy 2006 – cross-country skier who has competed since 2001, member of the U.S. 2010 Olympic Cross-Country Ski Team
- Kevin Mahaney 1984 – competitive and Olympic sailor who won a silver medal at the Barcelona Olympic Games in 1992
- John Morton 1968 – Olympic biathlon skier, member of seven olympic teams
- Mike Noonan 1982 – head soccer coach at Clemson University, two-time NCAA National champion (2021, 2023)
- Ali Nullmeyer 2024 – Canadian World Cup alpine ski racer
- Jacquie Phelan 1981–1994 – national mountain bicycle champion (1983, 84, 85); sustainable transit advocate and writer; feminist; founder of Women's Mountain Bike & Tea Society; opened cycling to non-athletic women of all ages; co-founded NORBA and IMBA; Alumni Achievement award winner
- Penny Pitou 1960 – first American skier to win a medal in the Olympic downhill event
- Hig Roberts 2014 – US Ski Team member and two-time national champion in giant slalom and slalom; first openly gay male alpine skier
- Donald Rowe – former coach of the University of Connecticut men's basketball team
- Chad Salmela – current NBC commentator and coach; former member of the US skiing team 1990–1998
- Lia Smith – diver
- Alex Sobel – basketball player for Hapoel Haifa of the Israeli Basketball Premier League
- Chris Waddell 1991 – Paralympic sit-skier and wheelchair track athlete

=== Business ===
- George Arison – founder and CEO of Shift
- Louis Bacon 1979 – hedge fund manager, one of Forbes magazine's 400 wealthiest Americans
- Brendan Bechtel 2003 – CEO of the Bechtel Group, Inc.
- Joseph Beninati 1987 – real estate developer and private equity investor
- Randy Brock 1965 – executive VP, Fidelity Investments; former Vermont auditor of accounts (2005–2007); Vietnam War veteran, recipient of the Bronze Star
- Willard C. Butcher (attended) – chairman and CEO of Chase Manhattan Bank, 1980–1991
- Carlos Calleja 1999 – Salvadoran businessman and politician
- Maciej Cegłowski – businessman; founder of Pinboard
- Roger Chapin – businessman-turned-fundraiser, self-described "nonprofit entrepreneur," founder of numerous charities variously under scrutiny for questionable ethics
- Jim Davis 1966 – chairman of New Balance; co-founder of Major League Lacrosse; one of Forbes magazine's 400 wealthiest Americans
- John Deere (did not graduate) – blacksmith, inventor of the steel plow and founder of John Deere & Company
- Patrick Durkin 1979 – managing director at Barclays
- Jack Fitzpatrick – founder of Country Curtains; Republican member of the Massachusetts State Senate
- Bryan Goldberg – founder of Bleacher Report; founder and CEO of Bustle magazine
- Nelson Z. Graves – founder of N. Z. Graves, Inc. paint and varnish company, real estate developer of Cape May, New Jersey
- A. Barton Hepburn 1871 – U.S. comptroller of the currency and president of Chase National Bank
- Peter Holmes à Court 1990 – Australian businessman; joint owner of the National Rugby League team South Sydney Rabbitohs with Russell Crowe; son of the late billionaire businessman Robert Holmes à Court
- Bill Maris 1997 – CEO of Google Ventures
- Terry McGuirk 1973 – chairman of Major League Baseball's Atlanta Braves and vice chairman of Turner Broadcasting System, where he served as CEO 1996–2001
- Ted Pick – chairman and CEO of Morgan Stanley
- William H. Porter – prominent New York City banker
- Carolyn Reidy 1971 – CEO of Simon & Schuster (2008–2020)
- Felix Rohatyn 1949 – president of Rohatyn Associates LLC; former partner and managing director of Lazard; commander in the Légion d'honneur; member of the Council on Foreign Relations and the American Academy of Arts and Sciences
- Vivian Schiller 1984 (MA) – former president and CEO of National Public Radio; New York Times senior vice president and general manager for NYTimes.com
- Dan Schulman 1980 – president and CEO of PayPal; former CEO of Virgin Mobile USA
- Ron Somers – founder and CEO of India First Group; played a lead role in coordinating the passage of the India–United States Civil Nuclear Agreement
- Christopher Tsai – founder of Tsai Capital; major collector of works by Ai Weiwei; son of financier Gerald Tsai
- John Waldron 1991 – president and COO of Goldman Sachs

=== Journalism ===
- Peter Theo Curtis 1991 – journalist who was held hostage and released by the al-Nusra Front
- Elizabeth Farnsworth 1965 – journalist and co-anchor of PBS NewsHour with Jim Lehrer
- Trip Gabriel – New York Times style editor
- Dwight Garner 1988 – New York Times book critic
- Mel Gussow 1955 – theater critic who wrote for The New York Times for 35 years
- W. C. Heinz 1937 – sportswriter and winner of the Red Smith Award for sports journalism
- Andrea Koppel 1985 – journalist, former U.S. State Department correspondent and Beijing Bureau Chief for CNN, Time4Coffee podcast host, entrepreneur
- Alexandra Kotur – fashion journalist, Style Director and contributing editor for Vogue; author of Carolina Herrera: Portrait of a Fashion Icon; co-author of The World in Vogue: People, Parties, Places
- Bob Lefsetz – music industry journalist
- Dori J. Maynard – president of the Robert C. Maynard Institute for Journalism Education in Oakland, California
- Andrew Meldrum – journalist and former correspondent of The Economist and The Guardian in Zimbabwe, 1980–2003
- Nina Munk 1989 (MA) – journalist and non-fiction author; contributing editor at Vanity Fair; author of Fools Rush In: Jerry Levin, Steve Case, and the Unmaking of Time Warner
- Mark Patinkin 1974 – columnist at the Providence Journal
- Alex Prud'homme 1984 – journalist and author of nonfiction books, including My Life in France, written in collaboration with his great-aunt Julia Child
- Andrew Purvis – journalist, John S. Knight fellow at Stanford University; former bureau chief for Time magazine's Berlin bureau
- Jane Bryant Quinn 1960 – contributing editor for Newsweek; former author of the twice-weekly column "Staying Ahead," syndicated by the Washington Post Writers Group
- Robert Schlesinger – author; opinion editor for U.S. News & World Report; Huffington Post blogger; co-founder of the blog RobertEmmet
- Frank Sesno 1977 – Washington Bureau chief and White House correspondent for CNN; professor of Public Policy at George Mason University and George Washington University
- Vendela Vida 1993 – novelist, journalist, and editor; co-founded and co-edits the monthly periodical The Believer
- David Wolman 1996 – author and journalist; has written for Wired, Newsweek, Discover, National Geographic Traveler, New Scientist and Outside
- Janine Zacharia 1995 – journalist, Middle East correspondent for the Washington Post; former diplomatic reporter for Bloomberg News

=== Law ===
- Charles Minton Baker – served in the Wisconsin Territorial Council and the first Wisconsin Constitutional Convention of 1846; helped with the codification of the laws of the state of Wisconsin; served briefly as Wisconsin Circuit Court judge
- Frederick Howard Bryant 1900 – federal judge on the United States District Court for the Northern District of New York
- John C. Churchill 1843 – lawyer and politician
- Walter H. Cleary 1911 – chief justice of the Vermont Supreme Court
- Albert Wheeler Coffrin 1941 – federal judge on the United States District Court for the District of Vermont
- Brian Concannon 1985 – director of the Institute for Justice & Democracy in Haiti
- George W. F. Cook 1940 – Vermont attorney and politician; president of the Vermont State Senate; United States attorney for the District of Vermont
- Stephen S. Cushing M.A. 1916 – associate justice of the Vermont Supreme Court, 1952–1953
- Charles Davis 1811 – justice of the Vermont Supreme Court
- Walter C. Dunton – justice of the Vermont Supreme Court
- Marilyn Jean Kelly 1961 (MA) – jurist in the US state of Michigan, justice on the Michigan Supreme Court
- Brian T. Moran – United States attorney for the Western District of Washington 2019–2021
- Samuel Nelson 1813 – US Supreme Court associate justice
- Edward John Phelps 1840 – second controller of the United States Treasury; a founding member and president of the American Bar Association
- Daniel Roberts – attorney and president of the Vermont Bar Association
- William K. Sessions III 1969 – chief judge on the United States District Court for the District of Vermont and chair of the United States Sentencing Commission
- Henry Franklin Severens 1857 – federal judge on the United States District Court for the Western District of Michigan and United States Court of Appeals for the Sixth Circuit
- Martha B. Sosman 1972 – lawyer and jurist from Massachusetts; Associate Justice of the Massachusetts Supreme Judicial Court
- Barry Sullivan 1970 – Chicago lawyer and, as of July 1, 2009, the Cooney & Conway Chair in Advocacy at Loyola University Chicago School of Law; former litigation partner at Jenner & Block LLP
- William H. Walker 1858 – justice of the Vermont Supreme Court

=== Military ===
- David A. Christian – retired United States Army captain and former candidate for the Republican nomination in the 2012 United States Senate election in Pennsylvania
- Paul Eaton (MA) – retired United States Army general known for his outspoken criticisms of President George W. Bush's administration
- Charles G. Haines 1816 – adjutant general of New York
- Frederic Williams Hopkins 1828 – adjutant general of the Vermont National Guard, 1837–1852
- Henry Martyn Porter 1857 – American Civil War Union Army officer; colonel and commander of the 7th Vermont Infantry
- James M. Warner (attended) – New England manufacturer, brevet brigadier general in the Union Army during the American Civil War

=== Philanthropy ===
- Joseph Battell – publisher and philanthropist, owner of the Bread Loaf Inn, predecessor to the Bread Loaf School of English
- Nínive Clements Calegari 1993 – CEO of 826 National; founding executive director of 826 Valencia
- Eileen Rockefeller Growald 1974 – philanthropist and fourth-generation member of the Rockefeller family; founder of the Institute for Healthcare Advancement; the Collaborative for Academic, Social, and Economic Learning; the Champaign Valley Greenbelt Alliance; and Rockefeller Philanthropy Advisors
- Dana Reeve 1984 – philanthropist and actress; founder and former chair of the Christopher and Dana Reeve Foundation; wife of actor Christopher Reeve
- Alan Reich 1953 (MA) – founder of the National Organization on Disability
- John Wallach 1964 – founder of Seeds of Peace

=== Politics ===
==== Heads of government ====
- Lado Gurgenidze (attended) – 17th prime minister of Georgia

==== Diplomats ====
- Jehudi Ashmun (attended) – US representative to the Liberia colony in its second decade and its governor (1824–1828)
- John Beyrle – U.S. Ambassador to Russia under President Barack Obama
- Bradford Bishop (MA) – United States Foreign Service officer who has been a fugitive from justice since allegedly murdering five members of his family in 1976
- Kimberly Breier – assistant secretary of state for Western Hemisphere Affairs (2018–2019)
- Lisa D. Kenna – United States ambassador to Peru since 2021
- Earle D. Litzenberger 1979 – former US ambassador to Azerbaijan (2019–2022)
- Román Macaya – Costa Rican scientist, entrepreneur, diplomat, and public servant; served as Costa Rica's Ambassador to the United States (2014–2018)
- Edward John Phelps 1840 – envoy to Great Britain (1885–1889); senior counsel for the United States before the international tribunal at Paris to adjust the Bering Sea controversy
- Felix Rohatyn 1949 – U.S. ambassador to France under President Clinton
- Joel Turrill 1816 – U.S. consul to the Kingdom of Hawaii (1845–1850)

==== U.S. senators and representatives ====
- Eli Porter Ashmun 1807 – Federalist United States senator from Massachusetts, 1816–1818
- Elbert S. Brigham 1903 – U.S. representative from Vermont
- Titus Brown 1811 – U.S. representative from New Hampshire
- Daniel Azro Ashley Buck 1807 – U.S. representative from Vermont
- Alexander W. Buel 1830 – former U.S. congressman from Michigan
- Davis Carpenter 1824 – former U.S. representative from New York
- Sean Casten 1993 – U.S. representative from Illinois
- Calvin C. Chaffee 1835 – doctor and former U.S. representative from Massachusetts, outspoken opponent of slavery
- Barbara Comstock 1981 – former U.S. congresswoman for Virginia's 10th District
- Bill Delahunt 1963 – U.S. congressman from Massachusetts
- John Dickson 1808 – U.S. representative from New York
- Solomon Foot 1826 – former U.S. senator and president pro tempore of the United States Senate during the Civil War
- Calvin T. Hulburd – former U.S. representative from New York
- Rollin Carolas Mallary 1805 – former U.S. representative from Vermont
- James Meacham 1832 – U.S. representative from Vermont
- Frank Pallone 1973 – U.S. congressman from New Jersey
- John Mason Parker 1828 – U.S. representative from New York
- Samuel B. Pettengill 1908 – U.S. representative from Indiana; nephew of William Horace Clagett
- Charles Nelson Pray (attended) – U.S. representative from Montana
- Albio Sires 1985 (MA) – member of the United States House of Representatives from New Jersey's 13th congressional district
- Robert Stafford 1935 – 71st governor of Vermont, U.S. representative, and U.S. senator
- John Wolcott Stewart 1846 – U.S. Senator and Representative from Vermont, and from the family for whom Stewart Dorm on the Middlebury campus is named
- Stanley R. Tupper 1943 – U.S. representative from Maine
- James Wilson II 1820 – U.S. representative from New Hampshire
- Silas Wright 1815 – former chairman of the U.S. Senate Finance Committee, Democratic senator, and governor of New York

==== Governors ====
- Carlos Coolidge 1811 – 19th governor of Vermont; relative of President Calvin Coolidge
- Jim Douglas 1972 – 80th governor of Vermont
- Horace Eaton 1825 – 18th governor of Vermont
- Mark Gordon 1979 – 33rd governor of Wyoming (2019-present)
- William Alanson Howard 1839 – member of the United States House of Representatives from Michigan and governor of the Dakota Territory
- Lyman Enos Knapp 1862 – governor of the District of Alaska, 1889–1893
- John Mattocks 1832 – 16th governor of Vermont
- John A. Mead 1864 – 53rd governor of Vermont
- Stephen Royce 1807 – 23rd governor of Vermont
- William Slade – 17th governor of Vermont
- John Wolcott Stewart 1807 – 33rd governor of Vermont
- James Tufts 1855 – politician and acting governor of Montana Territory in 1869

==== State senators and representatives ====
- Claire D. Ayer – Democratic member of the Vermont State Senate, representing the Addison senate district, majority leader of the Vermont Senate as of fall 2006
- James K. Batchelder 1864 – lawyer and five-term member of the Vermont House of Representatives, including one term as Speaker, 1884–1886
- Michael P. Cahill 1983 – politician who represented the 6th Essex district in the Massachusetts House of Representatives, 1993–2003
- Merritt Clark 1823 – Democratic politician from Vermont; he was elected to the Vermont House of Representatives in 1832–33, 1839, and 1865–66, and to the Vermont Senate in 1863–64 and 1868–69, as well as the 1870 Vermont Constitutional Convention
- George W. F. Cook 1940 – Vermont attorney and politician; president of the Vermont State Senate; United States Attorney for the District of Vermont
- Luther Day – Republican politician in Ohio; was in the Ohio Senate; judge on the Ohio Supreme Court
- Martin Chester Deming 1812 – businessman and National Republican member of the Vermont House of Representatives, 1830–1932
- George Z. Erwin 1865 – former member of the New York State Senate
- Jack Fitzpatrick – founder of Country Curtains and Republican member of the Massachusetts State Senate
- Nicole Grohoski – Democratic member of the Maine House of Representatives
- Emory A. Hebard 1938 – member of the Vermont House of Representatives, 1961–1977 and Vermont State Treasurer, 1977–1989
- Lindsey Holmes 1995 – member of the Alaska House of Representatives
- Brett Hulsey 1982 – Wisconsin consultant and Democratic politician, elected to the Wisconsin State Assembly's 77th district in 2010
- Sylvester Nevins – Republican member of the Wisconsin State Senate
- Heather Sanborn 1997– attorney, businesswoman, Maine Public Advocate, and Democratic member of the Maine Senate
- Nathan B. Smith 1863 – member of the New York State Assembly
- William M. Straus 1978 – member of the Massachusetts House of Representatives
- Horace Holmes Thomas – lawyer, Union Army officer, state legislator including a term as Speaker of the Illinois House of Representatives, and federal customs appraiser
- Alexander Twilight 1823 – first African American to graduate from an American college; first African American elected to public office, serving as a representative in the Vermont House of Representatives

==== Other political figures ====
- Shenna Bellows 1997 – 50th Secretary of State of Maine
- Ron Brown 1962 – former chairman of the Democratic National Committee and U.S. Secretary of Commerce under President Clinton
- Brian Deese 2000 – member of the National Economic Council and special assistant to President Barack Obama for economic policy
- Charles V. Dyer – Chicago abolitionist; Stationmaster on the Underground Railroad
- Justin Elicker 1997 – mayor of New Haven, Connecticut
- Ari Fleischer 1982 – White House Press Secretary for President George W. Bush; field director for the National Republican Congressional Committee
- Beriah Green 1819 – reformer and noted abolitionist
- Henry Hitchcock (did not graduate) – first attorney general of Alabama; grandson of Ethan Allen
- David G. Hooker 1853 – mayor of Milwaukee, Wisconsin
- Ben LaBolt 2003 – White House communications director and senior advisor to President Joe Biden; deputy White House press secretary for President Barack Obama
- Richard P. Mills 1966 – commissioner of education for Vermont and New York
- Lord Ivar Mountbatten – deputy lieutenant of Devon; younger son of the David Mountbatten, 3rd Marquess of Milford Haven
- Torie Osborn 1972 – community organizer, LGBT rights activist and politician
- Alban J. Parker 1916 – Vermont attorney general
- Zina Pitcher 1822 – president of the American Medical Association, two-time mayor of Detroit, member of the Board of Regents of the University of Michigan
- Natalie Quillian – White House deputy chief of staff (2023–present), White House COVID-19 Response Team coordinator (2021–2022)
- Waitstill R. Ranney – Vermont doctor and politician; lieutenant governor of Vermont, 1841–1843
- Kenneth Rapuano 1984 – deputy Homeland Security advisor for President George W. Bush; assistant secretary of Defense for Homeland Defense and Global Security, 2018–present
- Raymond J. Saulnier 1929 – economist; chairman of the Council of Economic Advisors (CEA) under President Eisenhower
- Bert L. Stafford – mayor of Rutland
- Dugald Stewart 1842 – Vermont politician; former state auditor of accounts
- Richard C. Thomas 1959 – secretary of state of Vermont

=== Religion ===
- Hiram Bingham 1839 – missionary in Hawaii
- Irah Chase 1814 – Baptist clergyman
- Reuben Post 1814 – Presbyterian clergyman; served two separate terms as chaplain of the United States House of Representatives (1824 and 1831); served as Chaplain of the Senate of the United States (1819)
- Jeremiah Rankin 1848 – abolitionist, champion of the temperance movement, minister of Washington's First Congregational Church, and correspondent with Frederick Douglass
- Thomas Jefferson Sawyer 1829 – Universalist minister and educator; head of Clinton Liberal Institute; founder of Tufts University
- Byron Sunderland 1838 – Presbyterian minister, author, and Chaplain of the United States Senate during the Civil War
- Enoch Cobb Wines 1827 – 19th-century Congregational minister and prison reform advocate
- Miron Winslow 1813 – Congregationalist missionary in Ceylon

=== Science ===
- Louis Winslow Austin 1889 – physicist known for his research on long-range radio transmissions
- Myrtle Bachelder 1930 – chemist and Women's Army Corps officer, noted for her secret work on the Manhattan Project atomic bomb program, and for the development of techniques in the chemistry of metals
- Arthur H. Bulbulian – pioneer in the field of facial prosthetics
- Roger L. Easton 1943 – principal inventor and designer of GPS; recipient of the National Medal of Technology and Innovation
- Stanley Fields 1976 – biologist and HHMI investigator known for pioneering two-hybrid screening for discovering protein–protein interactions
- Walter W. Granger (honorary doctorate 1932) – vertebrate paleontologist
- Edwin James 1816 – botanist, scholar of Algonquian languages, translator and nature writer on the Long Expedition, U.S. Army surgeon, and first Euro-American settler on record to summit Pikes Peak
- Walter D. Knight 1941 – physicist, known for the discovery of Knight shift
- Henry Schoolcraft – geographer, geologist, and ethnologist, noted for his early studies of Native American cultures, and for his "discovery" in 1832 of the source of the Mississippi River
- Jill Seaman 1974 – physician specializing in infectious diseases for Médecins Sans Frontières (Doctors without Borders) and winner of a 2009 MacArthur Foundation "Genius Award"

=== Fictional ===
- In the John Irving novel A Widow for One Year, Ruth Cole and her friend Hannah Grant are Middlebury alumni.
- On the television show The Simpsons, recurring character Snake Jailbird is depicted as a Middlebury alumnus in the episode "22 Short Films About Springfield."
