= Dufner =

Dufner is a surname. Notable people with the surname include:

- Delores Dufner (born 1939), American sacred music composer, librettist, and organist
- Edward Dufner (1872–1957), American painter
- Jason Dufner (born 1977), American professional golfer

== See also ==
- Dubner
- Küfner
