= List of Middlebury College faculty =

The following is a list of notable Middlebury College faculty, including current and former faculty. For a list of Middlebury alumni, refer to the list of Middlebury College alumni.

== Notable faculty ==
Selected Middlebury faculty

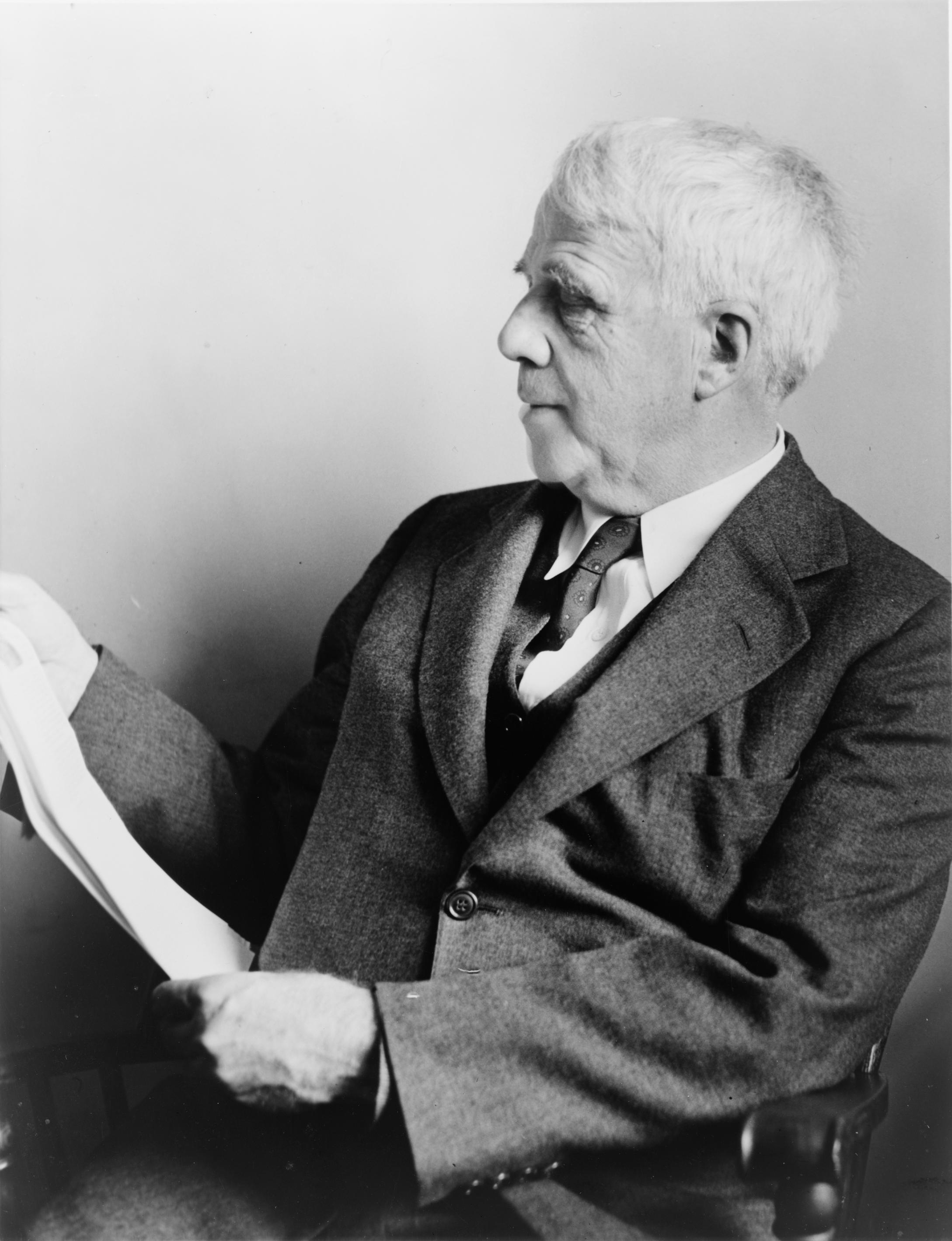
Robert Frost, professor of Poetry at Middlebury's Bread Loaf School of English and a major influence on the Bread Loaf Writers' Conference

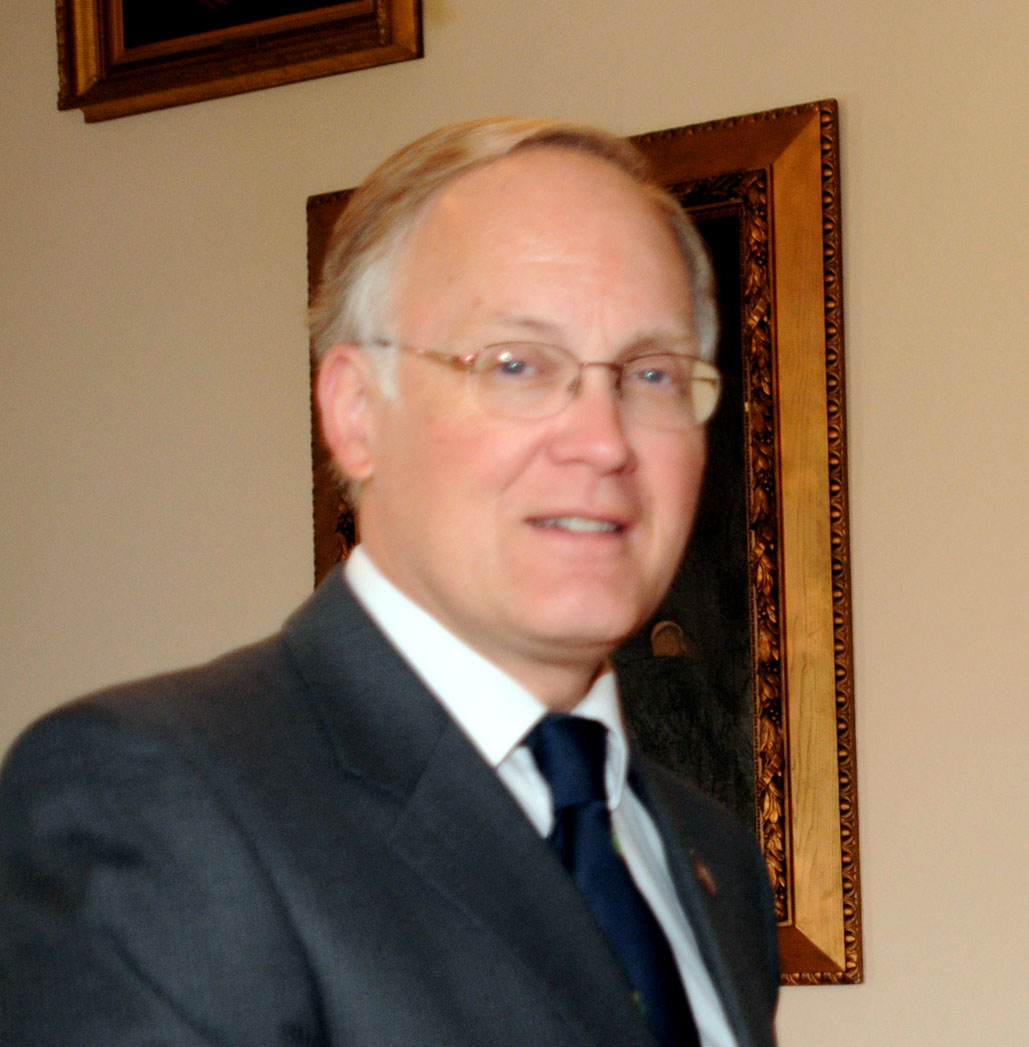
Jim Douglas, 80th governor of Vermont, Middlebury College Executive in Residence

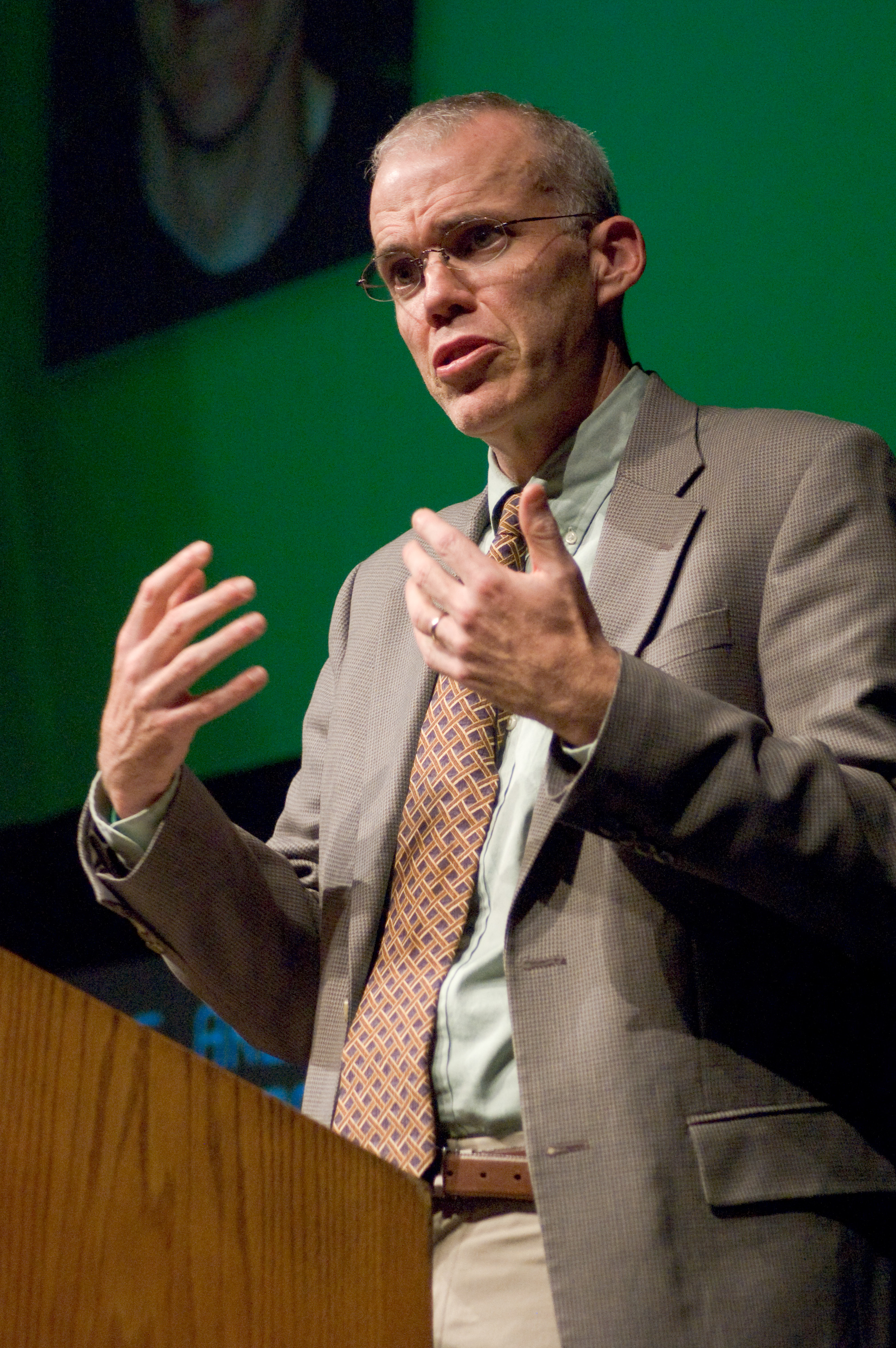
Bill McKibben, author and environmentalist, Schumann Distinguished Scholar

=== Arts ===
- Suzanne Bocanegra – professor of Art
- François Clemmons – Grammy Award-winning singer, Artist-in-residence and Twilight Scholar
- Patrick McNaughton – art historian, instructor of Art History
- Jason Mittell – professor of Film and Media Culture
- Su Lian Tan – composer and flautist, Professor of Music

=== Humanities and literature ===
- Eve Adler – professor of Greek, Latin and Hebrew
- Harold Bloom – taught at Bread Loaf School of English
- John Engels – poet, professor of Literature
- Frank Hugh Foster – professor of Philosophy
- Robert Frost – professor of Poetry at Middlebury's Bread Loaf School of English; a major influence on the Bread Loaf Writers' Conference
- John Gardner – taught at Bread Loaf Writers' Conference
- David Huddle – professor of creative writing, poetry and autobiography at Middlebury's Bread Loaf School of English
- John Irving – taught at Bread Loaf Writers' Conference
- Donald Justice – taught at Bread Loaf Writers' Conference
- Toni Morrison – taught at Bread Loaf Writers' Conference
- Howard Nemerov – taught at Bread Loaf Writers' Conference
- G. Dennis O'Brien – professor of Philosophy, 8th president of the University of Rochester
- Robert Pack – taught English; director of the Bread Loaf Writers' Conference 1973–1995
- Jay Parini – professor of Literature of Writing, co-founder of the New England Review, author of The Last Station
- John Crowe Ransom – taught at Bread Loaf School of English
- Theodore Roethke – taught at Bread Loaf School of English
- Mark Strand – taught at Bread Loaf Writers' Conference
- William Carlos Williams – taught at Bread Loaf School of English

=== Languages ===
- Oskar Seidlin – professor of German
- Mark R.V. Southern – professor of German and Linguistics
- Ghil'ad Zuckermann – professor of Hebrew Linguistics

=== Natural sciences ===
- Charles Baker Adams – professor of Chemistry and Natural History
- Matthew T. Dickerson – professor of Computer Science, scholar of the fiction of J. R. R. Tolkien and the Inklings
- Anne Kelly Knowles – professor of Geography
- Ronald D. Liebowitz – 16th president of Middlebury College, former professor of Geography
- Bill McKibben – environmentalist and Schumann Distinguished Scholar of Environmental Science
- Reuben D. Mussey – professor of Medicine
- John S. Rigden – professor of Physics, former editor of the American Journal of Physics, fellow of the American Association for the Advancement of Science and the National Academy of Sciences
- Frank Winkler – astronomer, Gamaliel Painter Bicentennial Professor of Physics
- Richard Wolfson – Benjamin F. Wissler Professor of Physics

=== Social sciences ===
- Nathaniel Chipman – professor of Law, former United States senator, former federal judge, and former chief justice of Vermont
- David Colander – Christian A. Johnson Distinguished Professor of Economics
- Murray Dry – Charles A. Dana Professor of Political Science
- Paul Monod – professor of History
- Caitlin Myers – professor of Economics
- Allison Stanger – professor of International Politics and Economics
- David Stoll – professor of Anthropology

=== Fellows in Residence ===
- Madeline Kunin – Bicentennial Fellow in Residence and 77th governor of Vermont

=== Middlebury Institute of International Studies at Monterey ===
- Jan Knippers Black – professor of Human Rights
- Avner Cohen – professor of Nuclear History and Strategic Policy
- Russell D. Howard – professor of Counterterrorism and Special Operations
- Beryl Levinger – professor of International Development
- William C. Potter – professor of Nonproliferation Studies; director of James Martin Center for Nonproliferation Studies
- Robert Rogowsky – professor of International Trade and Economic Diplomacy
- Jason Scorse – professor of Environmental Policy Studies; director of the Center for Blue Economy
