= Mark Weston =

Mark Weston may refer to:

- Mark Weston (journalist) (born 1953), American journalist, writer, and speaker
- Mark Weston (athlete) (1905–1978), British field athlete
- Mark Weston (Shortland Street)
