= Beninati =

Beninati is an Italian surname. Notable people with the surname include:

- Joe Beninati (born 1965), American sports announcer
- Joseph Beninati (born 1964), American real estate developer
- Manfredi Beninati (born 1970), Italian artist
