= HHV =

HHV may refer to:

- Help Hospitalized Veterans
- Higher heating value
- Historic Hudson Valley
- Human herpes virus
- Hydraulic hybrid vehicle
