= Patrick McNaughton =

American art historian

- Born: Patrick R. McNaughton; United States
- Occupations: Art historian Educator

Academic background
- Education: University of California, Los Angeles; Yale University
- Thesis: The Bamana Blacksmiths: A Study of Sculptors and Their Art (1977)

Academic work
- Discipline: Art history
- Sub-discipline: African art
- Institutions: Middlebury College; University of California, Santa Cruz; University of Wisconsin; Indiana University

Patrick R. McNaughton is an American art historian and educator. McNaughton is the Chancellor Professor of African Art History Emeritus at Indiana University.

== Career ==
McNaughton graduated from the University of California, Los Angeles with a Bachelor of Arts in Art History in 1966, and continued on to receive a Master of Arts in African Studies in 1971. He then earned another Master of Arts and a Doctor of Philosophy, both in Art History from Yale University, in 1972 and 1977 respectively. There, he wrote a doctoral dissertation on the art of the Bamana blacksmiths.

During the 1975 and 1976 academic year, McNaughton began his teaching career in the field of art history as an instructor at Middlebury College. In the following year, he joined the University of California, Santa Cruz as a lecturer. In 1977, McNaughton was named Assistant Professor of Art History at the University of Wisconsin. He was promoted to the Associate level in 1983, but moved to Indiana University in that same year. McNaughton would remain there for the rest of his career. In 1994, he received a Guggenheim Fellowship. In the following year, McNaughton became Professor of African Art in 1995, and six years later, his professorship was endowed as the Chancellor Professor of African Art History. He retired in 2017 and was given the title of Emeritus.

A scholar of African art, McNaughton focuses his research on Malian arts.

== See also ==
- List of Guggenheim Fellowships awarded in 1994
- List of Middlebury College faculty
- List of University of California, Los Angeles people
- List of University of Wisconsin–Madison people
- List of Yale University people
