= Dubner =

Dubner or Dübner is a surname. Notable people with the surname include:

- Gloria Dubner (born 1950), Argentinean astrophysicist
- Harvey Dubner, engineer living in New Jersey, noted for his contributions to finding large prime numbers
- Johann Friedrich Dübner (1802–1867), German classical scholar (naturalized a Frenchman), was born in Hörselgau, near Gotha
- Stephen J. Dubner (born 1963), American journalist who has written four books and numerous articles
