= Gloria Dubner =

Argentina astrophysicist (born 1950)

Gloria Mabel Dubner
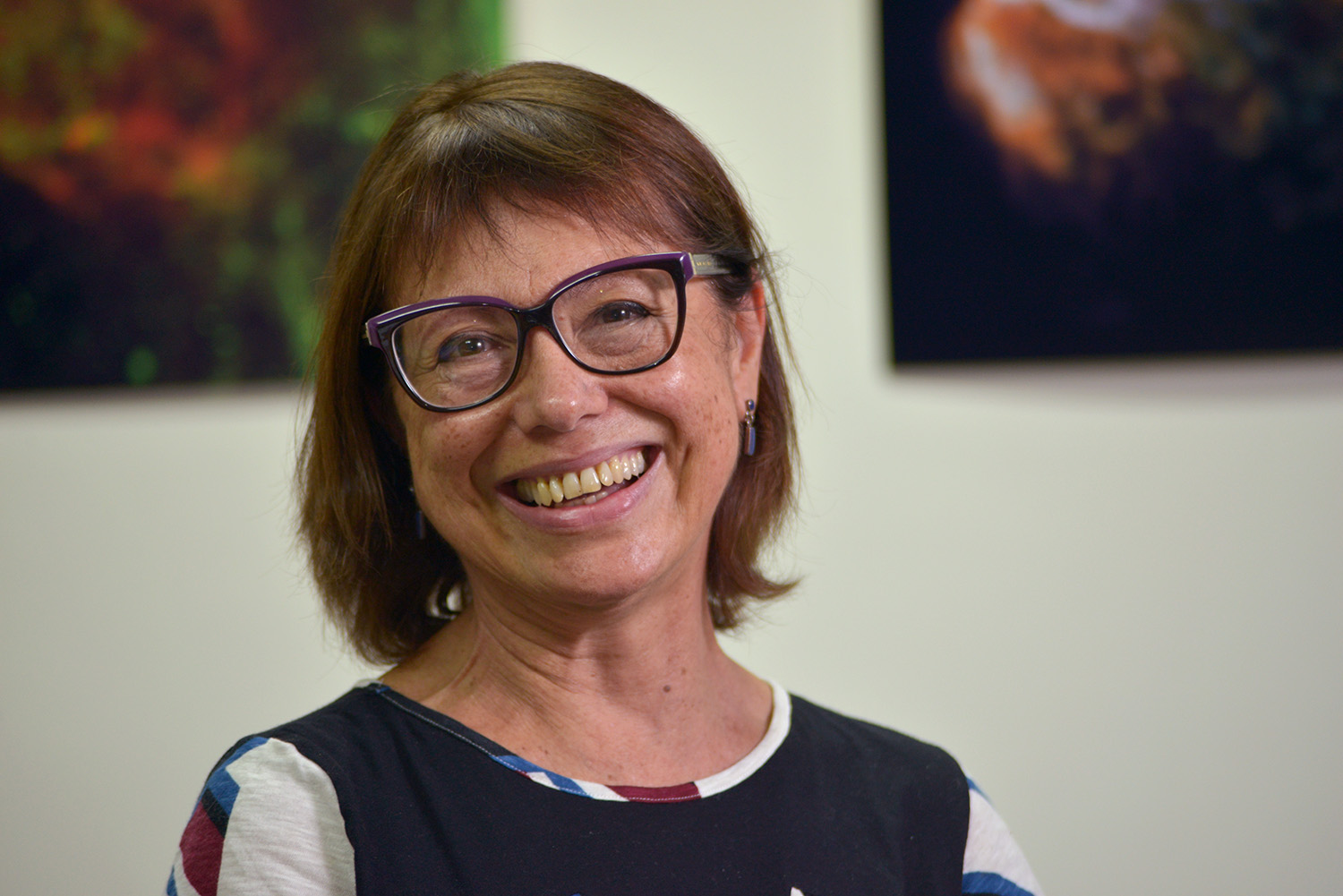
- Born: May 5, 1950 (age 76); Chajarí, Entre Ríos, Argentina
- Education: University of Buenos Aires, Licensure degree, 1974; National University of La Plata, PhD, 1982
- Known for: Leading the team that produced the highest quality image of the Crab Nebula
- Scientific career
- Fields: Astrophysics
- Workplaces: Instituto de Astronomía y Física del Espacio; National Scientific and Technical Research Council; Argentine Institute of Radio Astronomy
- Doctoral advisor: Fernando Raúl Colomb

Gloria Dubner (born May 5, 1950) is an Argentinian astrophysicist and director of the Instituto de Astronomía y Física del Espacio in Buenos Aires and a senior researcher at the National Scientific and Technical Research Council. She is known for her research on supernovas.

== Education ==
Dubner was born on May 5, 1950, in the city of Chajarí, located in the Entre Ríos Province in Argentina. She received her Licentiate degree in physics in 1974 from the University of Buenos Aires at the age of 23. She then attended National University of La Plata, where she received her PhD in physics in 1982 under the mentorship of astronomer and Guggenheim Fellow Fernando Raúl Colomb.

== Research and career ==
=== Career trajectory ===
Between 1975 and 1987, Dubner worked at the Argentine Institute of Radio Astronomy. In 1988, she began working at the Instituto de Astronomía y Física del Espacio (IAFE). In 1997, she also was appointed as a researcher at the National Scientific and Technical Research Council, continuing her study of supernovas. In 2009, she became the director of IAFE and also serves as the director of the Supernovas and Interstellar Environment group.

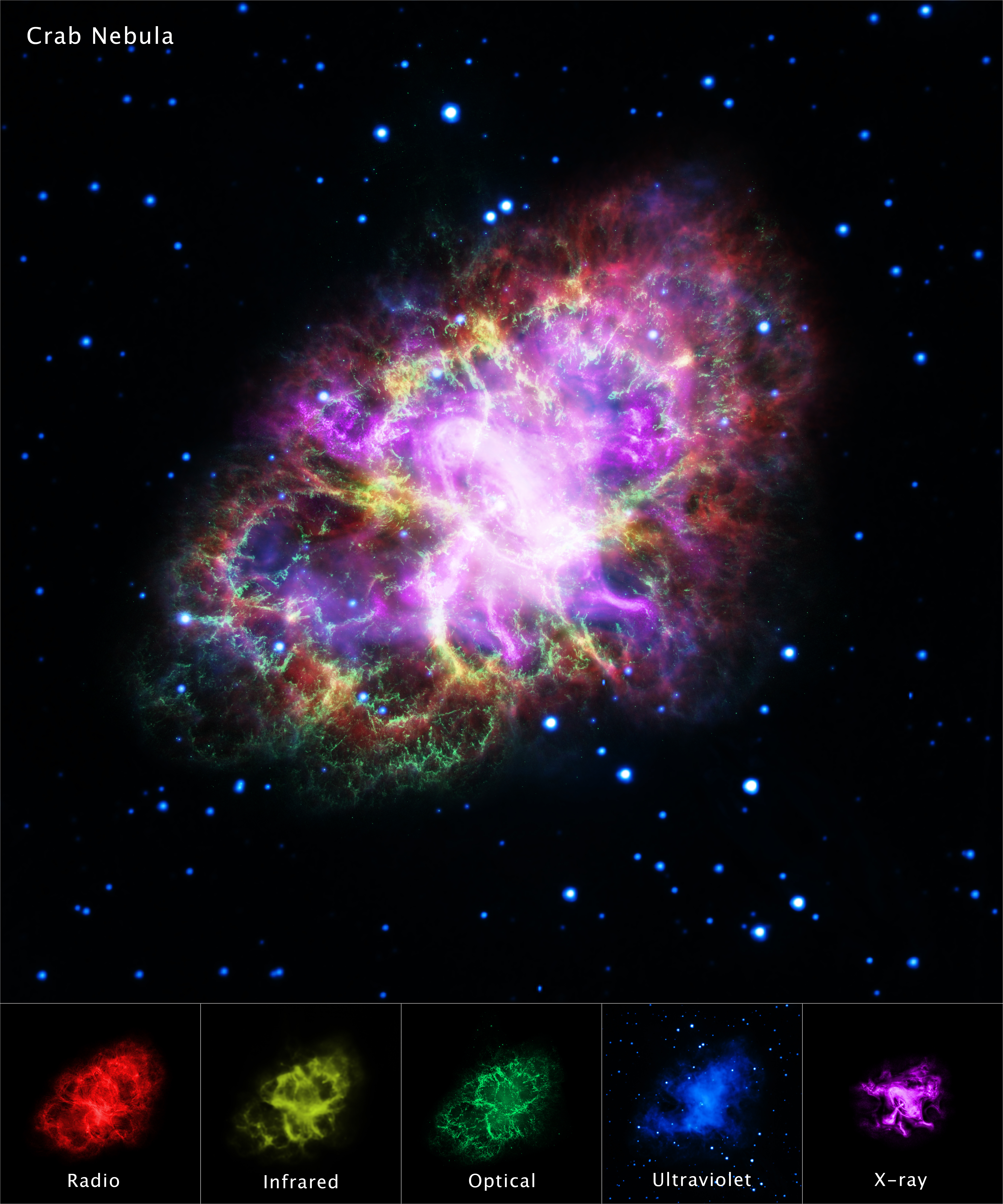
Image of the Crab Nebula generated by the collaboration led by Gloria Dubner.

=== Research contributions ===
Dubner has participated in a number of international collaborations to study galactic supernova remnants. For instance, in 1994, she and her American collaborators Frank Winkler and W. Miller Gross were awarded a National Science Foundation grant to image the expanding shell of gas left over after a star explodes using data collected from radio telescopes in the US and Argentina.

Starting in 2015, Dubner also led a collaboration between five observatories that led to the production of the most detailed image produced of the Crab Nebula, a bright supernova explosion first observed by Chinese astronomers in 1054. The collaboration leveraged data collected at different wavelengths to create a composite image using: infrared data generated by the Spitzer Space Telescope from NASA's Jet Propulsion Laboratory, visible light data from the Hubble Space Telescope, ultraviolet data from the XMM-Newton operated by the European Space Agency, radio image and X-ray data from NASA's Chandra X-ray Observatory, and radio data from the Very Large Array operated by the National Radio Astronomy Observatory.

== Leadership and recognition ==
Dubner is an active member of the International Astronomical Union (IAU), serving on a variety of commissions including the Working Group for Historic Radio Astronomy, the Division for Interstellar Matter and Local Universe, and the Commission for Astrochemistry. In 2006, she served on the Organizing Committee to report advances in the field of radio astronomy between 2002 and 2005. In 2012, she was part of the organizing committee of the IAU's XXVIII General Assembly for Women in Astronomy Meeting. In June 2008, the minor planet 9515 Dubner was named in her honor, recognizing her achievements at the IAU. The planet was first discovered at the observatory in El Leoncito National Park in 1975. In 2023 she won the Platinum Konex Award as the most important physicist in Argentina.
