= Shift Technologies (online marketplace) =

Online marketplace for used cars

Shift Technologies, Inc.
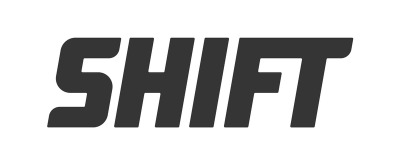
- Type: Public
- Traded as: OTC Pink: SFTGQ (in 2023); Nasdaq: SFT (2020-23)
- Industry: E-commerce, Automotive industry, transportation industry
- Founded: 2014; 12 years ago
- Founders: George Arison, Minnie Ingersoll, Christian Ohler, Joel Washington, and Morgan Knutson
- Headquarters: San Francisco California, United States
- Area served: San Francisco Bay Area and Greater Los Angeles, California

Shift Technologies, Inc. was an American company that sold used vehicles online and also maintained a consignment-based online marketplace for buying and selling used cars. Founded in 2014, Shift was based in San Francisco's Mission District. As of October 2022, the company offered its services in the San Francisco Bay Area, Greater Los Angeles, and Portland, OR. On October 6, 2023, Shift Technologies announced its intentions to file for Chapter 11 bankruptcy. As of that date, its final two locations in Oakland and Pomona, California, and its website are no longer in operation.

== History ==
Shift was founded in 2013 by: George Arison, Toby Russell, Minnie Ingersoll, Christian Ohler, Joel Washington and Morgan Knutson. The company was incorporated in 2014, and first launched in San Francisco in 2015.

The company initially served as an intermediary that bought and sold used cars on a consignment basis. The company then began acquiring cars outright and reselling them on its platform direct to buyers, removing the peer-to-peer consignment model.

As a private company, Shift received funding from Lithia Motors Inc., Goldman Sachs Investment Partners (GSIP), Draper Fisher Jurvetson (DFJ), Highland Capital Partners, SV Angel, Great Oaks Venture Capital, DCM Ventures and others. As of 2019, Shift has raised approximately $300 million, a mix of debt and equity.

In June 2020, Shift announced that it would engage in a merger with a special-purpose acquisition company (SPAC) called Insurance Acquisition Corp., then a public company listed on the Nasdaq under the ticker symbol INSU. Following the completion of the merger with Insurance Acquisition Corp. in October 2020 it was listed under the ticker SFT with a valuation of $415.9 million.

In 2021, Shift posted $637 million in revenue, which represented over 3 times year-over year growth.

In 2022, Shift announced an agreement to acquire the dealer listing marketplace assets of Fair Technologies, which will enable dealers and independent sellers to list their cars alongside Shift's own inventory. The acquisition closed on May 12, 2022.

On August 9, 2022, Shift announced that it planned to merge with used-vehicle consignment company CarLotz. The merger was completed on December 9, 2022.

On October 6, 2023, Shift Technologies announced its intentions to file for Chapter 11 bankruptcy. As of that date, its final two locations in Oakland and Pomona, California, and its website are no longer in operation.

=== Business model ===
Shift bought and sold used cars directly to and from consumers through its ecommerce platform. It facilitated financing options, inspections, Department of Motor Vehicles interactions, detailing, pricing and merchandising. Once Shift acquired a car, it inspected and repaired it through its regional reconditioning centers. From there, the company listed cars on its website where consumers could purchase the car online. All cars sold through Shift received a 150-point inspection prior to being sold, and included a seven-day, 200-mile return policy.
