= Andrew Purvis =

Andrew Purvis is a journalist. In 2010 he became a John S. Knight fellow at Stanford University. He is a former bureau chief for Time magazine's Berlin bureau. He was working for Time as early as 1991. Purvis has also written for the Smithsonian magazine.

== Personal ==
Purvis was born and raised in Montreal.

== Career ==
He began his career in journalism in 1983 as a city reporter for the Western News in Vancouver, British Columbia. Four years later he joined the Vancouver Sun where he was responsible for reporting on science. In 1989 he began working as a medical reporter for Time magazine. In 1992 he became the Africa bureau chief and later served bureau chief in Canada, the Balkans, Eastern Europe, Turkey and Germany.

== Education ==
He received his bachelor's degree from Middlebury College and his master's degree from Columbia University School of Journalism.
