= Mark Weston (journalist) =

American journalist, writer, and speaker (born 1953)

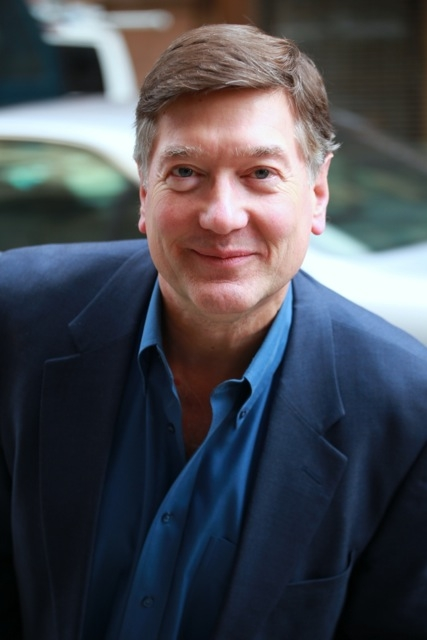
- Born: July 26, 1953 (age 73)
- Occupations: Author, Journalist, Speaker
- Writing career
- Genres: Politics and History
- Notable works: Giants of Japan: The Lives of Japan’s Greatest Men and Women, Prophets and Princes: Saudi Arabia from Muhammad to the Present

Mark Weston (born July 26, 1953) is an American journalist, writer, and speaker, as well as the author of five books, including "The Runner-Up Presidency: The Elections that Defied America's Popular Will," (Lyons Press, 2016), Giants of Japan: The Lives of Japan’s Greatest Men and Women (Kodansha 1999), a work the Los Angeles Times called a "superb new book,” and Prophets and Princes: Saudi Arabia from Muhammad to the Present (Wiley 2008), which Britain’s New Statesman praised as “always intelligent.”

== Biography ==
Weston grew up in Armonk, New York and graduated from Brown University with a B.A. in History. He spent a year at the London School of Economics, then earned a J.D. degree from the University of Texas. He has been a lawyer for ABC Television and a journalist for ABC News, and has written articles for the New York Times, The Washington Post, the Los Angeles Times and the New York Daily News. His one-character play, Meet George Orwell has been performed at Trinity College, Oxford and the John Kennedy Presidential Library Theatre in Boston, among other venues.

In 1991, Weston won enough money on TV’s Jeopardy! to start a company that makes geographical jigsaw puzzles for children. He sold his firm three years later to a larger puzzle company, F.X. Schmid, then lived with a Japanese family near Tokyo while researching Giants of Japan. Former Vice President Walter Mondale wrote the book’s foreword, and Foreign Affairs called it “vivid, an excellent introduction to Japanese history.” Giants of Japan went into paperback in 2002, and again in 2008. Weston has also written a children’s book, Honda: The Boy Who Dreamed of Cars, that Lee & Low Books published in 2008.

In 2004, Weston was a visiting scholar at the King Faisal Center for Research and Islamic Studies in Riyadh, Saudi Arabia. He completed his next book, Prophets and Princes: Saudi Arabia from Muhammad to the Present, four years later. Wyche Fowler, a former US ambassador to Saudi Arabia, wrote the foreword, and Saudi Aramco World said Weston “writes sensitively about the post-9/11 era.” Weston’s interest in the Muslim world began when he lived in Lahore while writing his first book, The Land and People of Pakistan (HarperCollins 1992).

Weston's interest in the Middle East and Far East began with a 9th grade class in non-Western studies that Herb Klinger taught at Byram Hills High School, Armonk.

Weston is the son of writers. His father, William Weston, wrote and produced television documentaries, including The Soviet Woman for ABC News in 1963, and The Last Word, a Peabody award-winning talk show, for CBS in the mid-1950s. His mother, Marybeth Little Weston, was a poet, and the garden editor of House & Garden magazine during the 1970s. His sister, Carol Weston, is also a writer, the author of a dozen books of fiction and advice.
