= Carol Weston =

American writer (born 1956)

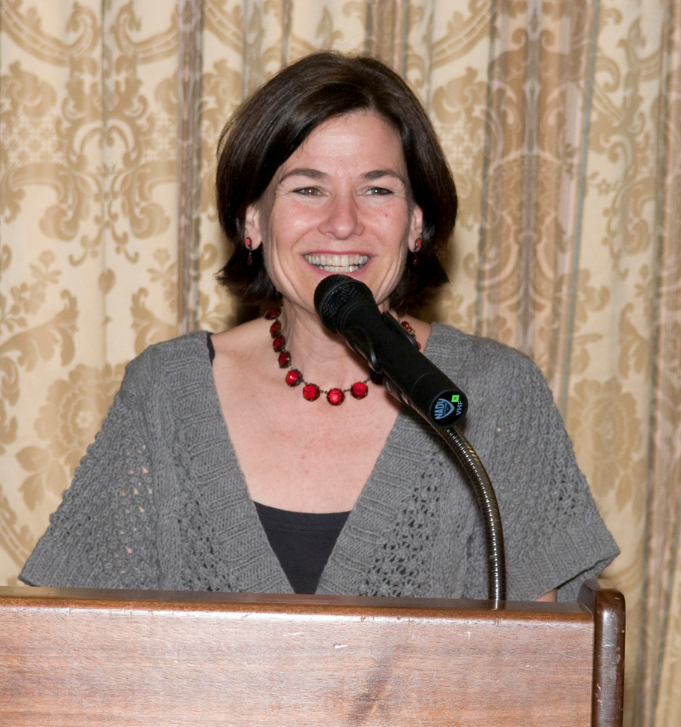
- Carol Weston at the New York Society Library in 2009
- Born: Carol Weston; September 11, 1956 (age 69); New York
- Occupation: Author
- Spouse: Rob Ackerman
- Writing career
- Genres: Children's literature and advice column
- Website: www.carolweston.com

Carol Weston (born September 11, 1956) is an American writer. The author of sixteen books, both fiction and non-fiction, she has been the "Dear Carol" advice columnist at Girls' Life since the magazine's first issue in 1994. Her newest book is Speed of Life, which received starred reviews in Kirkus, Publishers Weekly, School Library Journal, and Booklist. The New York Times Book Review called it "perceptive, funny, and moving."

About Ava and Pip (Sourcebooks Jabberwocky 2014), The New York Times Book Review said, "This is a book about sisterhood, but also a love letter to language." Also in this series: Ava and Taco Cat (2015) and AVA XOX (2016).

== Biography ==
At Yale University, Weston majored in French and Spanish comparative literature, graduating summa cum laude in 1978. Her senior thesis was on "Don Juan and Woman" and she was a member of the Elizabethan Club. She earned her master's degree in Spanish from Middlebury College in 1979. Weston also studied at Byram Hills High School in Armonk, New York, spending her senior year in France with School Year Abroad in 1974.

Weston's first book, Girltalk: All the Stuff Your Sister Never Told You, (HarperCollins 1985), came out in four editions and was translated into many languages, including Mandarin, Cantonese, Russian, Vietnamese, Romanian, Bulgarian, Indonesian, Latvian, and Polish. Her first novel, The Diary of Melanie Martin, (Knopf 2000), was translated into Italian and Czech, and became a four-book series set in Italy, Holland, Spain, and New York.

Weston speaks at schools and been a guest on many national television shows, including The View, Today, Oprah, and CNN Español. Her online advice for adults and girls can be found at "Howdini" and on her YouTube Channel "GirltalkWithCarol". She is a judge of the Young Writers Award at the New York Society Library.

Weston's other books include For Girls Only, For Teens Only, Private and Personal, How to Honeymoon, Melanie Martin Goes Dutch, With Love From Spain, Melanie Martin", "Melanie in Manhattan, and a "memoir" called From Here to Maternity. Of For Girls Only, USA Today said, "There are so many dumb advice books that it's a pleasure to find one that really works."

Weston's first national byline was in Seventeen when she was 19. Her essays, articles, quizzes, and reviews have appeared in The New York Times, Chicago Tribune, CNN, Yale Magazine, Publishers Weekly, Brides, Parents, American Way, Middlebury Magazine, Cigar Aficionado, Cosmopolitan, Glamour, Redbook, McCall's, and elsewhere. She has published over fifty letters in The New York Times including this letter about Facebook.

Weston is the daughter of writers. Her father, William Weston, was a writer, director, and producer of documentaries including The Soviet Woman and the Peabody-winning television show The Last Word. Her late mother, Marybeth Weston Lobdell, was an author and the garden editor of House & Garden. Her brothers are Eric Weston and author Mark Weston.

Weston and her husband, playwright Rob Ackerman, met in Madrid, Spain, and have lived in Manhattan since 1985. They have two daughters, Emme and Lizzi Ackerman.

== Selected works ==
- Girltalk: All the Stuff Your Sister Never Told You (1985, 1991, 1997, 2004, Four Editions) (HarperCollins)
- Girltalk About Guys (1987) (HarperCollins)
- How to Honeymoon (1986) (HarperCollins)
- From Here to Maternity (1991) (Little, Brown)
- Private and Personal (2000) (HarperCollins)
- The Diary of Melanie Martin (2000) (Knopf)
- Melanie Martin Goes Dutch (2002) (Knopf)
- For Teens Only (2003) (HarperCollins)
- The Girls’ Life Awesome Advice Guide to Everything (2003) (Scholastic)
- With Love From Spain, Melanie Martin (2004) (Knopf)
- For Girls Only (2004, 2008, Two Editions) (HarperCollins)
- Melanie in Manhattan (2005) (Knopf)
- Ava and Pip (2014) (Sourcebooks Jabberwocky)
- Ava and Taco Cat (2015) (Sourcebooks Jabberwocky)
- AVA XOX (2016) (Jabberwocky Sourcebooks)
- Speed of Life (2017) (Jabberwocky Sourcebooks)
