= George Arison =

Georgian-born American businessman

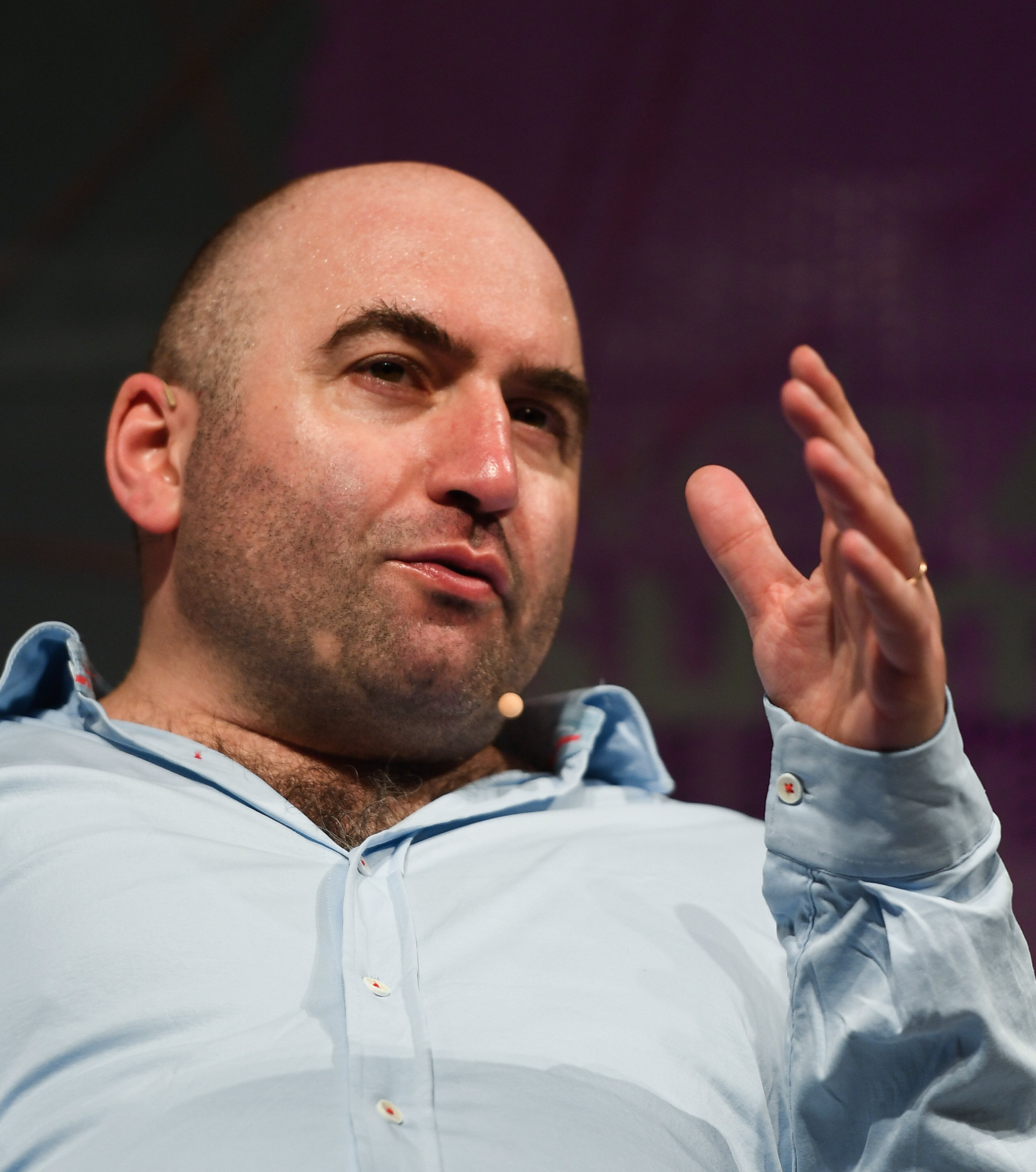
- Arison in 2019
- Born: Irakli Areshidze (ირაკლი არეშიძე); 1977 (age 48–49); Tbilisi, Georgian SSR, Soviet Union
- Education: Middlebury College (BA)
- Occupations: Entrepreneur; businessman
- Title: Founder of Shift; CEO of Grindr
- Spouse: Robert Luo (m. 2019)
- Children: 2

George Arison (born Irakli Areshidze, Georgian: ირაკლი არეშიძე; in 1977) is a Georgian-born American businessman and investor. He is the founder and co-CEO of Shift. Prior to Shift, in 2007, he co-founded Taxi Magic, known today as Curb (RideCharge, Inc.). As a political scholar and activist, he is considered for strong pro-democracy views for Georgia in its post-Soviet transition. Arison is currently the CEO of Grindr.

== Early life and education ==
Arison was born Irakli Areshidze in Tbilisi in Georgia in 1977. He moved to the United States at the age of 14, first settling in Maine. Arison claims to be the "first student from the Soviet Union allowed to attend a private U.S. high school without a government sponsorship". In 2000, he graduated from Middlebury College in Vermont, with a bachelor's degree in political science, having studied under political scientist Murray Dry.

== Career ==
=== Early career ===
After graduating from Middlebury, between 2000 and 2004, Arison moved to Washington D.C. to pursue a career in politics, founding a think tank focused on building democracy in his home country of Georgia. He went to Tbilisi to help manage an election campaign there.

He also worked briefly for Boston Consulting Group (BCG) alongside his fellow Middlebury alum Toby Russell. In 2007, he co-founded Taxi Magic, today known as Curb (RideCharge, Inc.), which uses mobile technology to organize transportation, on demand. In the same year, Arison authored the book ‘’Democracy and Autocracy in Eurasia," published in 2007.

=== Shift ===
In 2014, Arison co-founded Shift, an online, peer-to-peer, marketplace for buying and selling used cars. Shift acts as "an agent between used car buyers and sellers." In 2014, Arison secured a $23.8 million investment, primarily from chief investors DFJ and Highland Capital Partners, as well as SV Angel and Great Oaks VC, along with individuals like Lars Rasmussen of Google Maps and Hans Robertson of Meraki.

In 2015, Arison made a deal with Goldman Sachs, which led to a $50 million investment in Shift. The investment's purpose was to expand the company's services beyond Silicon Valley and Los Angeles to compete with market leaders like Carmax and Craigslist. Arison said at the time: "We think that any city with 250,000 people or more could have an awesome Shift marketplace. We don’t want to make a lot of money on the car itself. Marketplaces win when they offer a better product for less money." Between 2017 & 2018 BMW iVentures, Alliance Ventures, and Lithia Motors participated in multiple rounds of investment (Series C & D) which brought together $178 million in equity and debt.

In October 2020, Arison led Shift through a merger with a Special Purpose Acquisition Company (SPAC) called Insurance Acquisition Corp, which brought an additional $300 million to the company and resulted in Shift becoming a publicly traded company at Nasdaq.

=== Political activity and commentary ===
In May 2016, when Donald Trump was criticized for his policies by businesspeople in Silicon Valley, Arison was included, saying, "We all very strongly believe in immigration and bringing very skilled, awesome people to the U.S. and welcoming them. Google wouldn’t exist if it wasn’t for (Russian-born) Sergey Brin and Tesla wouldn’t exist if it wasn’t for Elon Musk."

In the same year, Arison was a speaker for the Clinton Global Initiative. He has also contributed to numerous publications, including the Christian Science Monitor, The Wall Street Journal, and The Washington Post.

In 2020, Arison also publicly supported the CARES Act, considering it "a huge win for small business owners" during the coronavirus pandemic.

=== Grindr ===
In September 2022, Arison was named CEO of gay dating app Grindr prior to the company going public through a merger with Tiga Acquisition Corp. Arison has stated publicly his plans for the organisation and a change to the company offerings via an introduction to a multi-tier paid subscription model and increase investments on app monetisation. In July of 2023, employees at Grindr announced a union campaign to which Arison responded to by instituting a return to office policy. This move has been used as a common union busting tactic.

As CEO of Grindr, he unsuccessfully lobbied against provisions of the UK's Online Safety Act 2023 requiring adult dating apps to verify users' ages. He argued that age verification should instead be handled by Apple's App Store and Google Play, saying they already possess the information needed to confirm users' ages. He said the UK requirements increased compliance costs and led around 7% of Grindr's monthly active users in the UK to stop using the app because they were unwilling to provide personal information directly to a dating service.

=== Controversies ===
On October 2022, Arison faced backlash for Tweets that resurfaced where he showed support for conservative politicians who have criticized various LGBTQ+ community policies such as Donald Trump and Virginia Governor Glenn Youngkin. These resurfaced as he became the CEO of Grindr.

=== Investments ===
Currently, he is an investor in following early-stage startups; Shipper, Carrot Fertility, Pulsar AI, AutoLeap, and TravelBank.

== Personal life ==
In early 2019, Arison married Robert Luo. In fall of the same year, the couple had two children named Luka and Emilia via surrogacy.
