= Jason Scorse =

Jason Scorse is an associate professor of Environmental Policy Studies at the Middlebury Institute of International Studies. Scorse is also the director of the Center for the Blue Economy.

== Biography ==
Scorse received his Ph.D. in Agricultural and Natural Resource Economics from University of California Berkeley in 2005 with a specialization in environmental economics and policy, international development, and behavioral economics.

Scorse was featured in Fortune magazine and CNN Money to explain surfonomics which measures the market value of a good surf break.
