= Rob Ackerman (playwright) =

Contemporary American playwright (born 1958)

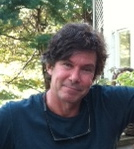
- Ackerman in 2011
- Born: Rob Ackerman; December 1, 1958 (age 67); Columbus, Ohio
- Occupation: Playwright
- Spouse: Carol Weston
- Children: Lizzi Ackerman, Emme Ackerman
- Writing career
- Notable works: Tabletop, Volleygirls, Dropping Gumballs on Luke Wilson

Rob Ackerman (born December 1, 1958) is a contemporary American playwright and screenwriter. His plays include Tabletop, which won the 2001 Drama Desk Award for Best Ensemble Performance, Volleygirls, which won the New York Musical Theater Festival Best in Fest, Call Me Waldo, Dropping Gumballs on Luke Wilson (directed by Theresa Rebeck in 2019 and produced by Working Theater at A.R.T. in New York), and Loyalty. In 2021, Ackerman wrote an opinion piece for CNN called "I'm a prop master, and I see red flags everywhere", about the fatality on the movie set of Rust in New Mexico.

== Early life and education ==
Ackerman was born and raised in Columbus, Ohio. He graduated from Columbus Academy. He is a Phi Beta Kappa graduate of Middlebury College, where he majored in Theater and Spanish. He earned his M.F.A. in Stage Directing at Northwestern University.

== Career ==
Ackerman's first success was Tabletop, staged at the American Place Theatre in 2000. John Simon, writing for New York Magazine, called it "acidly funny" and "spot-on about the making of a T.V. commercial." Ackerman's other plays include Disconnect] (2005, Working Theater, Classic Stage Company), Icarus of Ohio (2008, NYU Tisch School of the Arts), Volleygirls (2009, American Conservatory Theater), and Call Me Waldo (2012, Working Theater, Off Broadway and Kitchen Theater, Ithaca). His debut play, Origin of the Species, became a movie starring Amanda Peet, Michael Kelly, and Jean Louisa Kelly, and directed by Andrés Heinz, who wrote the original screenplay that became Black Swan. Ackerman won an award for Screenwriting at the Huntington International Independent Film Festival. He and Sam Forman along with Carol Weston have written a full-length screenplay for her novel Speed of Life. His current project is Stargazer, a feature film written with Kate Ginna and directed by Alan McIntyre Smith and starring Matt Bogart, Ginna, and Lei Nico.

Volleygirls was developed and produced by Monica Raymund under the direction of Neil Patrick Stewart with songs by Sam Forman and Eli Bolin. In 2013, it was staged as part of the New York Musical Theater Festival and won Best of Fest, Outstanding Ensemble, and Most Promising New Musical. It later received the New World Stages Development Award and was workshopped at the University of Florida and performed at Grace Church School. Ackerman and Forman and Bolin also collaborated on a musical commissioned and produced by Grace Church School titled In the Air in 2016.

Ackerman's work has been published by Dramatists Play Service, Smith and Kraus, Vintage Books, and Playscripts, Inc. It has been nurtured at Yaddo, Flux, The Lark, Access Theatre, At Hand Theatre, and Dorset Theatre Festival. For 25 years, he worked as property master for the Saturday Night Live Film Unit, working on such shorts as Complicit, Conway, Karate Meet, and Grouch.

== Personal life ==
He currently lives in Manhattan with his wife, author Carol Weston. They have two daughters, Emme and Lizzi Ackerman.
