= Enoch Cobb Wines =

American Congregational minister and prison reform advocate

Dr. Enoch Cobb Wines
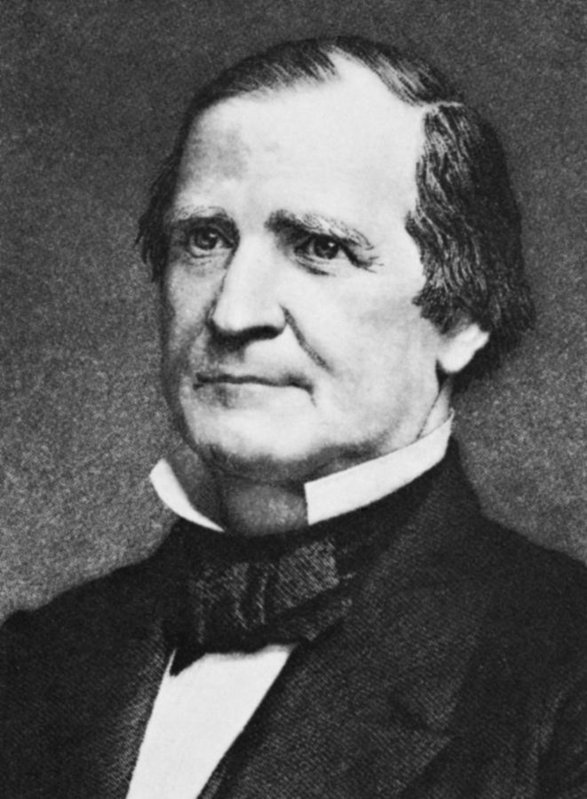
- Born: 17 February 1806; Hanover Township, NJ
- Died: 10 December 1879
- Resting place: Laurel Hill Cemetery, Philadelphia, PA
- Education: Middlebury College
- Known for: Education, Prison Reform

Enoch Cobb Wines (February 17, 1806 – December 10, 1879) was an American Congregational minister and prison reform advocate. He was born at Hanover Township, New Jersey, and graduated at Middlebury College in 1827. After teaching for some years he studied theology and began to preach in 1849. He served in a number of widely different positions in his lifetime. The foremost of them were: pastor at Cornwall, Vermont and East Hampton, Long Island; professor of languages in Washington College, Pennsylvania (1853); and president of St. Louis University in 1859. In 1862 he became secretary of the New York Prison Association, and of the National Prison Association in 1870. In 1871–72 he organized in London the first international congress on prison discipline.

Dr. Enoch Cobb Wines of the faculty of the Philadelphia Central High School from 1838 to 1841 became the first teacher of Ethics in an American High School in 1839.

Amongst his publications are:

- Two Years and a Half in the Navy (1832)
- Hints on Popular Education (1838)
- A peep at China in Mr. Dunn's Chinese collection : with miscellaneous notices relating to the institutions and customs of the Chinese, and our commercial intercourse with them (1839)
- Commentaries on the Laws of the Ancient Hebrews (1852)
- The Prisons and Reformatories of the United States and Canada (1867)
- Transactions of the National Congress on Penitentiary and reformatory Discipline (1871)
- Report on the International Penitentiary Congress of London (1872)
- Transactions of the Third National Prison Reform Congress (1874)
- Transactions of the Fourth National Prison Congress (1877)
- The Actual State of Prison Reform Throughout the Civilized World. Stockolm (1878)
- State of Prisons and Child-Saving Institutions (1880)
