= Jack Fitzpatrick (businessman) =

American businessman and politician

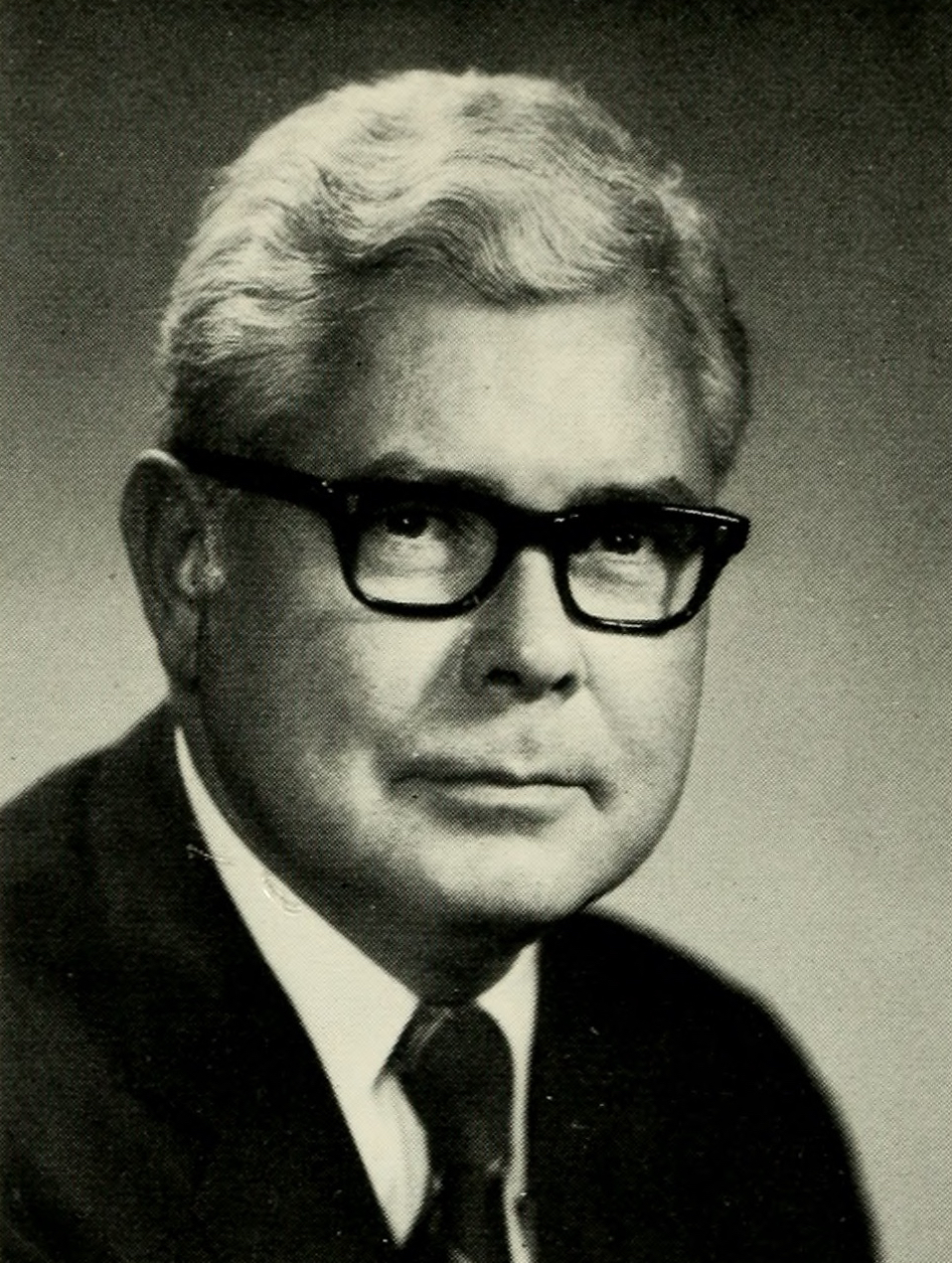
Portrait of John Hitchcock Fitzpatrick

John Hitchcock Fitzpatrick (April 5, 1923 – July 23, 2011) was an American businessman and politician from Massachusetts.

Born in Quincy, Massachusetts, Fitzpatrick grew up in Rutland, Vermont. He served in the United States Army during World War II. After the war, Fitzpatrick went to Middlebury College and in 1951 received his law degree from Boston University. He worked in his family's retail business. Eventually Fitzpatrick and his wife founded Country Curtains. From 1973 until 1980, Fitzpatrick served in the Massachusetts State Senate as a Republican.
