= Country Curtains =

American retail home curtain business

Country Curtains was a retail home curtain business founded in 1956 by Jane and Jack Fitzpatrick in Whitman, Massachusetts. They started their business from their dining room table selling unbleached narrow muslin curtains. It was Jack’s idea to sell unbleached muslin ruffled curtains through the mail, reminiscent of their Vermont heritage. At the time, these curtains were not readily available in stores, but Jack suspected he would find a market if people knew where to buy them.

For their first ad, Jane sketched the curtains and Jane and Jack wrote the copy together. Each afternoon, Jane visited the post office to mail the curtain orders that had been received the previous day. The Fitzpatricks soon developed a strong following of customers.

Early on, Jack kept his job with the Lincoln Stores; however, in 1957, he was transferred to Pittsfield, Massachusetts. That is what brought the Fitzpatricks to Stockbridge, Massachusetts, and with them came Country Curtains. Country Curtains continued to operate out of the Fitzpatricks’ dining room until Country Curtains moved to the Red Lion Inn on Main Street in Stockbridge in 1969. The Fitzpatricks saved the inn from demolition, preserving a historic building while accommodating Country Curtains’ need for more space.

In 1976, the Fitzpatricks formed the Housatonic Curtain Company (HCC), a separate manufacturing arm producing products for only Country Curtains. Today, the factory produces 50% of Country Curtains’ line.

In 1981, Country Curtains moved to its current location in Lee, Massachusetts. The construction of the distribution center was accompanied by the first color catalog. In later years, the distribution center tripled in size to hold the growing business.

In 1996 Country Curtains launched a website.

By 2015, the small independent company had begun to suffer from the competition of companies like Amazon and Wayfair. In October 2017, Country Curtains shareholders voted to liquidate the company, and its retail stores, catalog and internet operations ceased operations at year end.

In February 2018, the Vermont Country Store purchased Country Curtains’ designs.

== Product line ==
In addition to curtains, panels, shades and top treatments, Country Curtains offered curtain rods and home decorating accessories such as bedding, rugs, lamps, and prints.

Along with a number of retail stores, the company maintained its flagship store on Main Street in Stockbridge, Massachusetts. It was located in the historic Red Lion Inn, which the Fitzpatricks purchased in 1968 and renovated extensively to house the growing Country Curtains business.

Country Curtains retail stores were located from New Hampshire to Virginia, and as far west as Chicago.

Retail stores

- Connecticut: Avon, South Windsor, Westport
- Delaware: Greenville
- Illinois: Naperville
- Maryland: Annapolis, Towson
- Massachusetts: Beverly, Pembroke, Stockbridge, Sturbridge, Sudbury
- New Hampshire: Newington
- New Jersey: Far Hills, Marlton, Ridgewood, Shrewsbury
- New York: Fishkill, Manhasset, Rochester
- Ohio: Solon
- Pennsylvania: Warrington
- Rhode Island: Cranston
- Vermont: South Burlington
- Virginia: Fairfax, Richmond
