= Küfner =

Küfner is a German surname. Notable people with the surname include:

- Matthias Küfner (born 1981), German footballer
- Robert A. Küfner (born 1988), German entrepreneur, author and investor
