= Roger Chapin =

Roger Chapin is an American businessman turned fundraiser living in San Diego, who calls himself a "nonprofit entrepreneur", according to Forbes magazine. He has launched more than 20 charities, and until 2009 was the president of Help Hospitalized Veterans, an American charity, whose stated purpose is, "Making time live for America's hospitalized veterans." The New York Times has labelled two of the organizations he founded, Help Hospitalized Veterans and Coalition to Salute America's Heroes as being " among a dozen military-related charities given a grade of F in a study last December by the American Institute of Philanthropy, a nonprofit watchdog group. These and other charities have collected hundreds of millions of dollars from kind-hearted Americans and squandered an unconscionable amount of it on overhead and expenses—70 percent or 80 percent, or more."

== Background ==
Chapin, 76 in 2008, is a graduate of Middlebury College, Middlebury, Vermont and a veteran of the U.S. Army Finance Corps.

Among Chapin's private accomplishments, he was a successful real estate developer in San Diego County, founder of “Fun Art” creative coloring sets, founder of USAopoly—creator and distributor of the very popular special editions of the board game Monopoly. Chapin is married to Elizabeth and they have four children and two grandchildren. They are longtime residents of San Diego, California.

Chapin founded Help Hospitalized Veterans (HHV) after a successful business career. Chapin has also founded Coalition to Salute America's Heroes Foundation in Ossining, New York, the project G.I. Gift Pac, and Citizens for a Drug Free America, and is active in other advocacy endeavors and community works. According to Forbes magazine, early in its reporting on Chapin and his works, there have been dozens of organizations, often with similar and fast-changing names and goals.

In March 2009, in a commentary in the Washington Times, Chapin wrote of the risks of negotiating with Iran and the possibilities of Iran launching an electromagnetic pulse weapon against the United States. Hoping to "prevent a looming nuclear doomsday," Chapin proposed a two part plan:

1. Urgently initiate a massive buildup of the conventional weaponry needed to destroy Iran's nuclear facilities and wipe out its retaliatory capabilities as well as arm Israel to the teeth. Also station Aegis anti-missile ships along our coasts while beefing up homeland security and taking steps to mitigate the effects of an EMP attack. To do any less would be totally irresponsible and reckless.
2. Launch a massive series of preemptive strikes on Iran as soon as possible and send in special ops forces to ensure the mission was accomplished.

At the time, Chapin was identified as "founder and president of Make America Safe, a new San Diego–based policy and educational organization focused on the threat posed by radical Islamics to U.S. national security."

== Criticism ==
On September 3, 2007, a Forbes magazine article by William P. Barrett titled "Shell Game" reported that Chapin and his wife Elizabeth are accused of spending the money raised by their non-profit organizations to fund their own lifestyles, vehicles, and real estate investments—rather than to benefit troops or wounded veterans at the 97% efficiency rate that the charity claims.

Other Forbes reporting in regard to the HHV organization claims that of every dollar given, only nine cents went to therapeutic arts-and-crafts kits for wounded GIs (a primary purpose of the charity), while another five cents went towards associated overhead and for counselors to visit hospitals and nursing homes. Forty-seven cents of spending was for direct-mail expenses, with the remainder going for the salaries of the charity staff, etc.

On November 9, 2007, ABC News reported that Chapin and his wife, as founders and employees of the charitable organization, Help Hospitalized Veterans, paid themselves more than half a million dollars a year in salary. The American Institute of Philanthropy claims that of the $70 million that HHV received in contributions last year, only 31% went to the charitable cause, leading to a grade of "F" from the watchdog group.

According to Daniel Borochoff, the president of AIP, "[Chapin] is a charity entrepreneur. He's very good at setting up charities that don't do so much charitable but bring in lots, lots of money."

AIP followed up on Chapin with an article in its December 2010 issue of the Charity Rating Guide & Watchdog Report. According to AIP, “After enjoying years of generous, multiple six-figure salaries and perks paid with the charity's funds, such as use of a $444,600 condo in northern Virginia owned by HHV, access to a $17,000 country club membership, and large reimbursements for hotel, restaurant, and other expenses, Chapin's retirement from HHV was marked by a $1.9 million payout to the exiting president.”

After the Washington Times commentary ran in March 2009, Forbes found that Chapin's new foundation had been incorporated in 2008 and granted IRS 501(c)3 non-profit status in 2009. Forbes also noted at this time that a lawsuit against two former employees of Coalition to Salute America's Heroes Foundation, Raymond and John Clifford, had been reinstated. Both sides were then involved in pre-trial activities. "The lawsuit says the Cliffords, fired by Chapin in 2007, took 'confidential financial information' and made disparaging remarks about the coalition to reporters. The nonprofit seeks unspecified money damages and a court order barring further disclosures. The Cliffords assert a First Amendment right to speak out and say they've done nothing wrong."

In 2010, looking at the latest 2008 figures, Forbes again found high fund-raising expenses relative to actual program work at the Coalition. Of "$26.2 million spent for calendar year 2008, ... the Coalition by its own accounting spent just $5.7 million--22 cents of every dollar--on its two signature programs." Looking at Chapin's own financial gain and management position, Forbes found he "received total compensation of $364,000 from [HHV] but reported drawing no pay from the other organizations. The [HHV] Web site says he retired in August 2009 and left its board; a protégé, Mike Lynch, assumed Chapin's presidency. Chapin's current pay arrangements with his nonprofits haven't been revealed." Also:

"the $25 million in contributions received represented a 15% drop from 2007;
"although the Coalition plays up its efforts to provide injured soldiers with homes, only four residences were provided during 2008, at a total cost of $403,000;
"and the Coalition paid nearly as much, $358,000, in fees to Williams and Connolly, the high-profile Washington law firm it hired to sue John and Raymond Clifford."

In August 2012 the California Attorney General's office sued HHV, saying that Chapin and his successor, Michael Lynch, "grossly overpaid" and approved lavish perks for themselves from donated funds. According to the attorney general, when Chapin retired in 2009, the charity's board retroactively inflated his annual salary in order to justify giving him a $2 million retirement pension.
