= Frank Winkler =

P. Frank Winkler, Jr. is an astronomer and noted subject-matter expert on supernova. He received his doctorate from Harvard and is currently the Gamaliel Painter Bicentennial Professor in Physics at Middlebury College located in Middlebury, Vermont.

== Career overview ==
Winkler received his bachelor's degree from the California Institute of Technology and his doctorate from Harvard University. He began teaching at Middlebury College in 1969 and is currently the Gamaliel Painter Bicentennial Professor Emeritus of Physics.

Dr. Winkler has calculated the distance for the brightest supernova event recorded in human history, SN 1006, as being ~7,200 light years distant.

Winkler has received multiple U.S National Science Foundation Grants for Supernova research, one of which was for a continued collaboration between astronomers from Argentina and the United States for research that focused on imaging Supernova Remnants. Frank Winkler is also a member of the International Astronomical Union.
