= Joseph Beninati =

American businessman

Joseph P. Beninati
- Born: 23 February 1964 (age 62); Bronx, New York City, U.S.
- Education: Choate Rosemary Hall; Middlebury College (B.A., 1987)
- Occupations: Real estate developer, private equity investor
- Children: 3

Joseph P. Beninati (born February 23, 1964) is a Texas-based entrepreneur, real estate developer, and private equity investor. During his 37-year career, he has developed residential and commercial real estate projects across the Southeast and Northeast.

== Recent projects ==
In 2020, Beninati wrote the business plan for what would become Double B Development and the Beninati Family Office became founding investors in this company.

In 2021, Double B developed a 140,000-square-foot industrial site in Sanford, Florida, that sold at a record-setting price to the global private equity firm KKR.

Wyld Oaks began in 2021 and Beninati began a series of appearances before Judge Lori V. Vaughan of the United States Bankruptcy Court for the Middle District of Florida to structure a global settlement to purchase the first 202 acres out of bankruptcy for what would become Wyld Oaks.

In 2023, Wyld Oaks sold 88 acres of its then 303 acres to an affiliate of Clarion Partners, the $79 billion real estate firm owned by Franklin Templeton. The record sales price achieved by Wyld Oaks allows Clarion’s development partner Cadence to construct 1.5 million feet of industrial buildings that will create thousands of jobs next door to Wyld Oaks.

Wyld Oaks used the record sales proceeds to pay off 100% of its debt and own the remaining 215 acres free and clear. Wyld Oaks was highlighted as #4 among the top 10 biggest Central Florida land deals of 2023 according to GrowthSpotter, the real estate-focused arm of the Orlando Sentinel.

In 2024, the massive mixed-use project located in Apopka, Florida, broke ground on the 215-acre mixed-use development that features approximately 4 million square feet of hotels, multifamily, condominiums, retail, food & beverage, boutique office, public parks, and an outdoor entertainment venue.

== Early life and education ==
Beninati was born into an Italian-American family in the Bronx, New York. His father worked at the Saturday Evening Post before opening his own photo processing lab. Beninati was a foot messenger in Manhattan while a teenager for his father’s photography business. He learned to drive during summer family visits in Texas. He was a football player who graduated from college preparatory school Choate Rosemary Hall and then earned his B.A. in 1987 at Middlebury College in Vermont, where he was a political science major.

== Early career ==
Upon graduating from college, Beninati began his career on Wall Street as an investment banker for Dean Witter Reynolds.

In 1990, he began an investment banking boutique, Beninati & Wood, Inc. His firm advised a New York financier on the restructuring of C3, Inc., and the acquisition of Telos Corporation (both defense industry contractors).

=== Telos Corporation ===
After the merger of C3 and Telos, he became chief financial officer in May 1992. Beninati became the chairman of Telos from 1994 to 1995. Telos was awarded a $1 billion contract with the U.S. Army during his tenure. Other Telos clients included the Department of Defense and the National Security Agency.

Beninati resigned from Telos to form Antares Investment Partners.

=== Antares Investment Partners and Greenwich Technology Partners ===
In 1996, Beninati, along with longtime friend and fellow Choate alumnus, Jim Cabrera, founded Antares Investment Partners. A substantial part of the early business was devoted to private equity.

In 1997, Antares made a founding investment in a network engineering company called Greenwich Technology Partners. Beninati served as the chairman and CEO for six years with clients such as JP Morgan, Dow Jones, ESPN, and Credit Suisse, and investors such as Juniper Networks and Chase Capital Partners.

In 2002, the company was named the 9th fastest growing company by Inc. Magazine.

In 2002, Beninati resigned as CEO and Greenwich Technology Partners was sold in 2003.

=== Real Estate ===
Beninati and Antares began focusing on real estate development in 2002. By 2006, the firm’s real estate portfolio value was $4.5 billion. The firm owned or co-owned properties located in Fairfield County, Connecticut, and Westchester County, New York, with Goldman-Sachs & Co., hedge funds, investment bankers, and other institutional investors.

In 2002, Antares purchased Pickwick Plaza, in Greenwich, CT, for $120 million. At the time, this was the highest price ever paid for a suburban office building, and all the leases were up for renewal. Antares renovated the commercial building and rented it to hedge funds and other finance firms. They sold it in 2007 for $235 million, about twice the purchase price.

One of Mr. Beninati’s most significant mixed-use accomplishments was co-founding Harbor Point in Stamford, CT, in 2003. For the Harbor Point development project on the Stamford, Connecticut waterfront, Antares acquired 82 acres of land for $171 million with a $3.5 billion redevelopment plan to create a master-planned community comprising five distinct neighborhoods. In 2008, after completing his vision in assembling and entitling this land, Beninati introduced a fellow Young President’s Organization member to lead the project’s vertical construction. In 2018, the Stamford Advocate reported that this was “one of the largest redevelopment projects in the nation.” By 2018, 4,200 multifamily units had been built at Harbor Point. Fifteen years after founding the project, the Beninati Family Office sold its interests in the project to realize one of its most successful investments to date.

In 2004, Antares purchased and began operating the Delamar Hotel on the Long Island Sound in Greenwich, Connecticut. The hotel was listed as one of the 80 best small hotels in the world by Conde Nast in 2003.

Antares also developed and built residential estates in Greenwich, CT. One home, called Two Fountains, sold in 2007 for $11 million. The other became the Lake Carrington site and sold for $13.75 million. A third, Stone Chase, won a HOBI award in 2007 for “best spec home over $9 million.”

In 2007, the firm purchased the US Tobacco building in Greenwich, Connecticut, for $130 million, and undertook a $70 million renovation of the structure with architectural firm Perkins Eastman. Antares won a TOBY award for this building.

Beninati was the founder and chairman of Bauhouse Group, a New York City real estate development and investment firm founded in 2012. Bauhouse is named after the Bauhaus style, an architectural movement in Europe prior to World War II.

During the fall of 2013, Beninati began an assemblage at 515 West 29th Street, the only property bordered by the High Line Park on two sides. The firm purchased the commercial building on the property for $24.4 million and purchased another $6 million in air rights. In March 2014, the firm completed the 43,000-square-foot assemblage of the property. The property was approved for residences and ground-floor retail.

The project, named 515 Highline, secured a $35 million construction loan. The Corcoran Group was named the sales agent for the property. Soo Chan, founder of Singapore-based architecture design firm, SCDA, was the designer of the building, which featured an art wall on the eastern facade. The curtain wall was manufactured in Italy. The 12-unit condo building opened for sales in 2015, with prices between $4.5 and $6 million for three-bedroom residences at about $2,500 per square foot. Larger penthouse units and duplex units were also offered over $20 million.

In March 2015, Bauhouse Group announced an assemblage on 58th Street off Sutton Place. The firm planned to raze four buildings and build a 1,000-foot tall 269,000-square-foot condo building designed by architect Norman Foster.

== Controversies ==
In 2007, Antares was sued for rent hikes in their condominiums, Greenwich Oaks and Greenwich Place. Antares obtained the buildings for $223 million, a Connecticut real estate record at the time.

In December 2007, a construction company called William Paul Inc. sued Antares. The owner said that Antares did not pay him the full profit share and management fees that he was entitled to. The suit was dropped, and no payments were made to the plaintiff.

In 2008, three investors in Antares Mansions sued for repayment of the $4.5 million invested in the project. The suit was settled.

In June 2021, a Texas federal bankruptcy judge discharged 100% of all specious New York State court claims by a creditor against Mr. Beninati personally, as well as the Beninati Family Office’s substantial assets. The creditor used a 2016 New York state court judgement against Mr. Beninati personally to thoroughly examine and unsuccessfully attack Mr. Beninati’s family office assets in a Texas federal court.

== Philanthropy ==
The Beninati Family Office supports the Tunnel to Towers Foundation and St. Jude Hospital.

Beninati endowed for Choate Rosemary Hall the Beninati Family Scholarship which is awarded each year.

In 2007, Beninati was given the co-Man of the Year award by March of Dimes Connecticut Chapter. In addition, Antares contributed the land for the construction of the Waterside School in Stamford, Connecticut.

== Honors and awards ==
Beninati was named an Entrepreneur of the Year by Ernst & Young during his time at Greenwich Technology Partners.

Inc. Magazine named Beninati and Antares in their 30 Under 30.

Antares was awarded Deal of the Year for its purchase of 100 West Putnam in Greenwich, Connecticut, and the redesign of that building earned it a BOMA building award.

Beninati was a member and board member of Young Presidents' Organization–Fairchester Chapter.

== Personal life ==
Joe Beninati met his wife at Choate and they married in 1990 and have three sons. He and his wife reside in Texas and Florida.
