= Pennsylvania State University Glee Club =

The Pennsylvania State University Glee Club is a choral ensemble at Pennsylvania State University (Penn State). The Glee Club is one of the top choral ensembles at Penn State and considered to be one of the best of its kind in the country. Founded in 1888, the Penn State Glee Club is the oldest student organization at Penn State consisting of 40-50 undergraduates and graduates from all colleges at the university. The Glee Club performs several concerts each year and frequently goes on tour, both domestically and internationally. The Glee Club performs a variety of music from Broadway to Classical music, and has its place in Penn State tradition by singing University fight songs and performing at numerous events. The Glee Club performs Penn State fight songs including Fight On, State, The Nittany Lion, Hail! Oh Hail!, and the Penn State Alma Mater. Dr. Christopher Kiver is the current director of the Penn State Glee Club.

== History ==
The Penn State Glee Club was started by nine students who came together to form the Penn State Glee Club and Banjo and Mandolin Society. At the time, the group was all-male. Led by Dr. George C. Butz, the Glee Club begun their touring tradition in 1889 going to the nearby towns of Bellefonte, Tyrone, Huntingdon, Altoona, Clearfield, Philadelphia, and Williamsport, Pennsylvania.

Following Butz’s direction, the Glee Club fell under the new leadership of Frank Peabody Atherton in 1889, followed by E.F. Davis in 1890. Charles M.H. Atherton then begun directing the Glee Club in 1893 until 1912. Under Atherton’s direction, the Glee Club performed music as well as comedic skits.

The Glee Club was next led by the first director of music at Penn State, Clarence C. Robinson who led the Glee Club from 1912-1922. Under Robinson’s direction, the Club went on a coast-to-coast tour via the Santa Fe Railroad. By this time the Glee Club had grown to about fifty members and included the select group, the Varsity Quartet. The Club also won many intercollegiate glee club competitions.

Dean Grant became the next director in 1922. The Glee Club continued to win several Pennsylvania State Championships and compete in the Intercollegiate Glee Club Eastern Division Contests, including champions in 1927 and 1935. In 1928 the Glee Club took its first European tour through places like England and France. The annual Mother’s Day Concerts were popular in attendance during this time. In 1934 the Hi-Lo’s were formed as a small ensemble. Originally known as the Hy-los, the members were a select group from the membership of the Glee Club.

Frank Gullo was the next director and began his leadership in 1940 while Grant was on leave and officially became director in 1942. However, in 1945 with most men fighting in World War II, the Glee Club became inactive, but quickly resumed when the war was over. Besides the inactive period, the Glee Club kept its tradition of touring. The Glee Club began a transition from strictly comedic repertoire to begin singing more Renaissance pieces and English madrigals; however the novelty and humorous selections remained. Gullo ended his leadership in 1967 and was succeeded by Lewis Spratlan. Spratlan began a new Glee Club tradition of regularly joining with women’s choruses in joint concerts. In 1967, Douglas Miller became the new director of the Glee Club. Miller also founded the Penn State Concert choir and Chamber Singers.

In 1970, Bruce Trinkley became the next and longest running director of the Glee Club. For 35 years, until 2005, Trinkley continued many Glee Club traditions including the spring break tours and varied musical selection.

In 2005, Dr. Christopher Kiver began his direction of the Penn State Glee Club. Through his direction, the Glee Club has made many appearances in state, regional, and national conferences. Although historically performing mainly at Penn State’s Schwab and Eisenhower Auditorium's, respectively, the Glee Club now performs their on-campus concerts in the School of Music's Recital Hall. Dr. Kiver also began a new tradition, In Low Voice (formerly, Men of Song), where many growing young men were invited from across the region to spend a day with the Glee Club to experience collegiate music making which, over the years, grew to include more and more middle and high school students every year.

In 2024, the Penn State Glee Club celebrated their 135th anniversary with a reunion concert at Eisenhower Auditorium on Saturday, October 26. Over 130 current and former Glee Club members performed.

== Directors ==
| Name | Years of Service |
|---|---|
| Dr. George C. Butz | 1888 |
| Frank Peabody Atherton | 1889 |
| E. F. Davis | 1890–1893 |
| Charles Morgan Herbert Atherton | 1893–1912 |
| Clarence C. Robinson | 1912–1922 |
| Richard W. Grant | 1922–1940 |
| Frank Gullo | 1940–1967 |
| Lewis Spratlan | 1967–1969 |
| Dr. Douglas Miller | 1969–1970 |
| Bruce Trinkley | 1970–2005 |
| Dr. Christopher Kiver | 2005 - |

== Hi-Lo's ==
Formed in 1934, the Hi-Los are a small subset of the Glee Club. The Hi-Los perform for many special occasions across the university. The group performs a cappella with light hearted and often comedic tunes. The Hi-Los have provided entertainment for University Presidents, alumni, donors, and others for more than 80 years. Many pieces performed by the Hi-Los have been arranged either by members of the Hi-Los or the Glee Club at large. In 2024, the Hi-Lo's celebrated their 90th anniversary at the reunion concert, along with the Glee Club's 135th anniversary.
