= Pennsylvania State University Libraries =

Library system

Coordinates: 40.79822°N 77.86609°W

Penn State University Libraries
- Location: Main Library, Penn State University Park, Pennsylvania, United States
- Type: Academic library
- Established: 1857
- Branches: 14 subject libraries at Penn State University Park and libraries at 22 other Pennsylvania locations

Collection
- Size: 6 million

Access and use
- Circulation: 894,155

Other information
- Director: Faye A.Chadwell, Dean of University Libraries and Scholarly Communications
- Employees: 576
- Website: https://libraries.psu.edu/

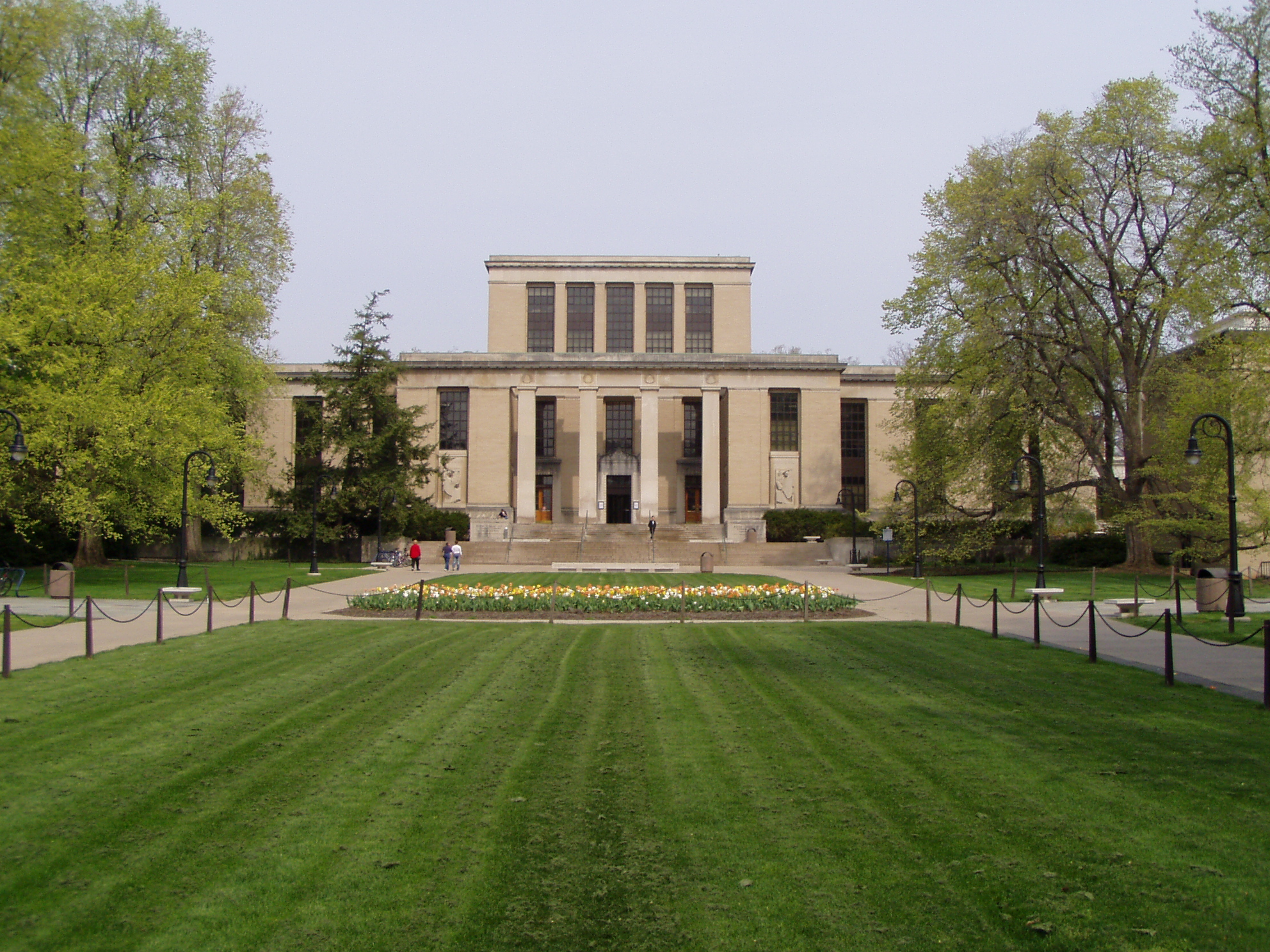
Pattee Library

The Penn State University Libraries consists of 36 libraries at 22 locations in Pennsylvania. The two main buildings on Penn State's University Park campus are the Pattee and Paterno libraries.

== History ==
The library's first permanent location was in Old Main, with 1,500 books in agriculture and the sciences. In 1904, the library was moved to the Carnegie Building (then "Carnegie Library"), which provided a 50,000 book capacity.

By 1940, the library's collection had grown to 150,000, overcrowding Carnegie by three times its capacity. The library was permanently moved to the Pattee Library building. By the 1960s, the collection had grown to 800,000 books.

The Pattee Library was renovated in the late 1990s, and in 2000, it was rededicated along with the new Paterno Library, a portion of which comprises the former East Wing of Pattee. Today, there are 14 libraries at the University Park campus alone, boasting a collection of over 5.4 million volumes.

Since 2000, the library also runs publishing services, including an Open Publishing program.

== Pattee Library ==
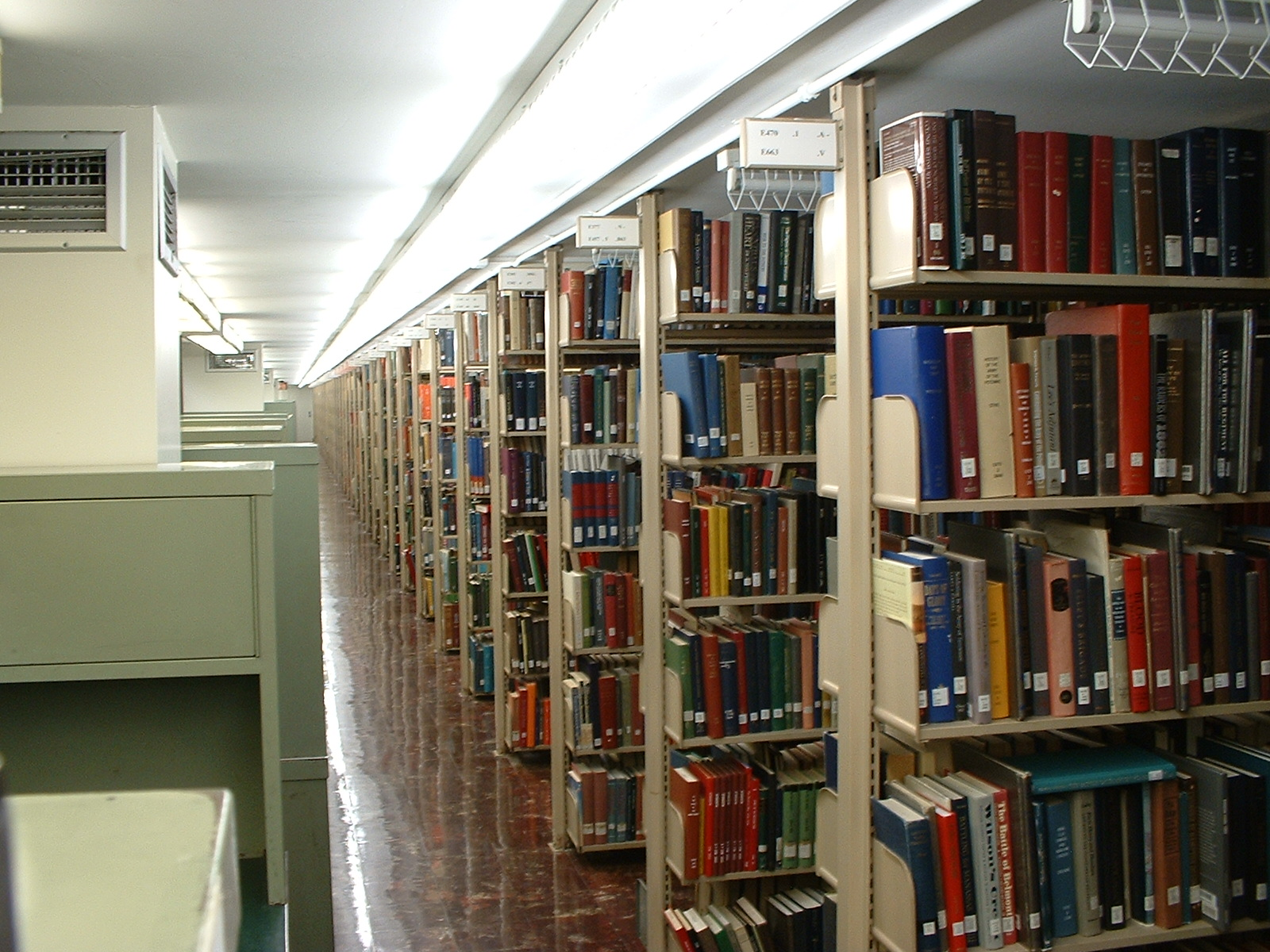
The Stacks

Pattee Library is named after Fred Lewis Pattee, who is widely regarded as the first professor of American Literature (1895–1928), and author of the Penn State Alma Mater. Pattee Library was built as part of a Public Works Administration-General State Authority project. Its construction took place over 1937–1940. Between 1940 and 1973, the library was expanded three times. The "Stacks" or Stack Building was added in 1953, "West Pattee" in 1966, and "East Pattee" in 1973. A renovation which included the construction of the Paterno Library began in 1998, and was completed in 2000.

The Pattee Library includes the circulation area for both libraries, which connects the original mall entrance with the Curtin Road entrance. In fall 2010, a Reading Room housing the Leisure Reading Collection on the first floor of Pattee Library opened in the Tombros/McWhirter Knowledge Commons. Another major feature of Pattee, on the second floor, is the Paterno Family Humanities Reading Room, a large reading room reminiscent of historical libraries, and the design was based on images of the New York Public Library legal collections room.

Pattee Library is home to the Arts and Humanities Library, Music and Media Center, Library Learning Services, Maps Library, Media Commons, Digitization and Preservation, Course Reserves Services, Disabilities Services, and News and Microforms Library.

It is located in the Farmers' High School Historic District added to the National Register of Historic Places in 1981.

== Paterno Library ==
In 1983, as Penn State football coach Joe Paterno was being honored for his first national championship, he gave a speech challenging the university's board of trustees to make Penn State number one in academics as well as athletics. He specifically targeted the need for a top-quality library, stating, "Without a great library, you can't have a great university." In 1993, he and his wife Sue, began a campaign which raised $13.75 million for the construction of a new library. The groundbreaking for the Paterno library, which took place in April 1997, named it in their honor. Paterno has also donated several millions of his own money towards the library.

Construction was completed in fall 2000, and the building was dedicated on September 8, 2000. It is connected to the Pattee Library, and shares a common circulation desk. The former East Wing of Pattee forms a portion of the Paterno Library. Paterno Library is home to the Business, Education and Behavioral Sciences, Life Sciences, Social Sciences, and Special Collections libraries.

Following Paterno's death in 2012 and the release of a report by former FBI Director Louis Freeh that concluded that Paterno concealed knowledge of assistant football coach Jerry Sandusky's sexual abuse of multiple children, some called for his name to be removed from the library. The university removed a statue of Paterno from outside Beaver Stadium, but university President Rodney Erickson, did not order the library to be renamed, saying it "remains a tribute to Joe and Sue Paterno's commitment to Penn State's student body and academic success, and it highlights the positive impacts Coach Paterno had on the University."

== Other Libraries ==
- Other libraries at the University Park campus include:
  - Architecture and Landscape Architecture Library (Stuckeman Family Building)
  - Earth and Mineral Sciences Library (Deike Building) This library is named in honor of Fletcher L. Byrom, a college alumnus.
  - Engineering Library (ECoRE Building)
  - Physical and Mathematical Sciences Library (Davey Building)
  - There are 22 additional libraries in the system, each in a separate campus location of the Penn State University.
- Penn State Harrisburg Library

== See also ==
- Penn State University Press
