= Beaver Stadium =

Home stadium of the Penn State Nittany Lions. University Park, Pennsylvania

- Happy Valley
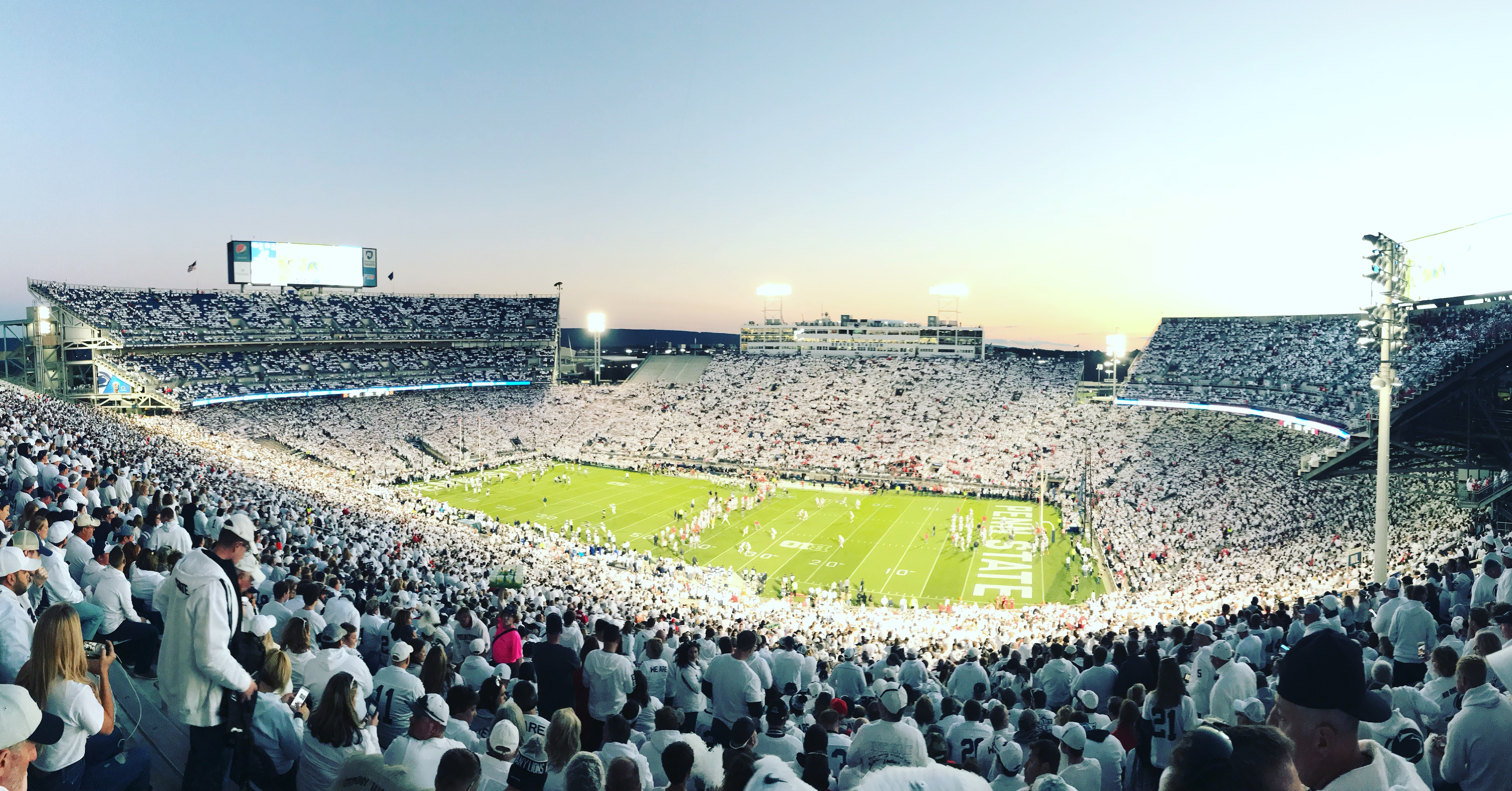
- Beaver Stadium during a night game in 2018
- Interactive map of Beaver Stadium
- Full name: West Shore Home Field at Beaver Stadium
- Address: 1 Beaver Stadium; University Park, Pennsylvania
- Location: Pennsylvania State University
- Coordinates: 40.8121°N 77.8560°W
- Operator: Pennsylvania State University
- Seating type: Stadium seating
- Capacity: 106,304 (2025–present) Former capacity: List: 106,572 (2011–2024); 107,282 (2001–2011); 93,967 (1991–2001); 83,370 (1985–1991); 83,770 (1980–1985); 76,639 (1978–1980); 60,203 (1976–1978); 57,538 (1972–1976); 46,284 (1969–1972)
- Executive suites: 60
- Type: College football stadium
- Event: College football
- Surface: Natural grass
- Scoreboard: LED Videoboards
- Screen: 2
- Record attendance: 114,419 (October 10, 2026, vs. USC)

Construction
- Groundbreaking: 1959
- Opened: 17 September 1960; Capacity 69,000
- Renovated: 2026 New upper concourse added on West stands and new LED field lighting added 2025 New West stands constructed 2024 New videoboards added to both end zones 2008 Marquee boards added 2001 New 10,000 seat upper deck in the South end zone, 60 enclosed skybox suites added to East stands 1985 Walkways and ramps added 1984 Field lights added
- Expanded: 1969, 1972, 1976, 1980, 1985, 1991, 2001, 2011, 2024–2027
- Cost: $1.6 million ($17.4 million in 2025 dollars) $93 million (2001 expansion)
- Architects: Michael Baker Jr, Inc. HOK Sport (2001 expansion); Populous (2024–2027 renovation)
- Project managers: Barton Malow, AECOM Hunt, Alexander Building Construction Co. (2024–2027 renovation)

Tenants
- Penn State Nittany Lions (NCAA); Football (1960–present); Men's soccer (1960–1971)

Website
- gopsusports.com/beaverstadium

Beaver Stadium is a college football stadium on the campus of Pennsylvania State University in Penn State University Park. It has been home to the Penn State Nittany Lions football of the Big Ten Conference since 1960, though some parts of the stadium date back to 1909. It was also the site of university commencements until 1984. The stadium, as well as its predecessors, is named after James A. Beaver (1837–1914), a governor of Pennsylvania (1887–91), president of the university's board of trustees, and native of nearby Millerstown. The stadium is part of College Township and has a University Park address.

Beaver Stadium has an official seating capacity of 106,572, making it currently the second-largest stadium in the Western Hemisphere and the fourth-largest in the world. Its natural grass playing field is aligned northwest to southeast at an approximate elevation of 1,150 feet (350 m) above sea level.

Beaver Stadium is widely known as one of the toughest venues for opposing teams in collegiate athletics. In 2008, it was recognized as having the best student section in the country for the second consecutive year. In 2019, it was named student section of the year by a committee of ESPN broadcasters and writers.

In 2016, Beaver Stadium was voted the number-one football stadium in college football in a USA Today poll, garnering over 41 percent of the vote. In March 2019, USA Today conducted another poll asking voters to decide the best stadium in the United States during "Bracket Madness", which coincided with the 2019 NCAA basketball tournament. Hundreds of thousands of fans voted for their favorites throughout the week. In the championship match-up, Beaver Stadium beat Kansas’ Allen Fieldhouse to claim the title of "Ultimate Stadium".

Since 2025, the stadium has been officially named West Shore Home Field at Beaver Stadium after Penn State entered into a naming rights deal with West Shore Home.

Beaver Stadium was the first to have its interior included in Google Street View.

== History ==
=== Predecessors ===
Until 1893, Penn State teams participated in sporting events on Old Main lawn, a large grassy area in front of the primary classroom building of the time. Beaver Field, a 500-seat structure located behind the current site of the Osmond Building, was the first permanent home for Penn State's football team, and the first game played there was a Penn State victory over Western University of Pennsylvania (now the University of Pittsburgh) on November 6, 1893. In 1909, New Beaver Field opened just northeast of Rec Hall, roughly in the current location of the Nittany Parking deck. It served as Penn State's stadium until 1959. During the 1959-60 offseason, the entire 30,000 seat facility was dismantled and moved half a mile to the east end of campus. It was then reassembled, bolted onto a modern upper grandstand, and named Beaver Stadium. The "new" stadium seated 46,284 people; it roughly corresponds to the lower level of the current facility.

=== Expansions ===
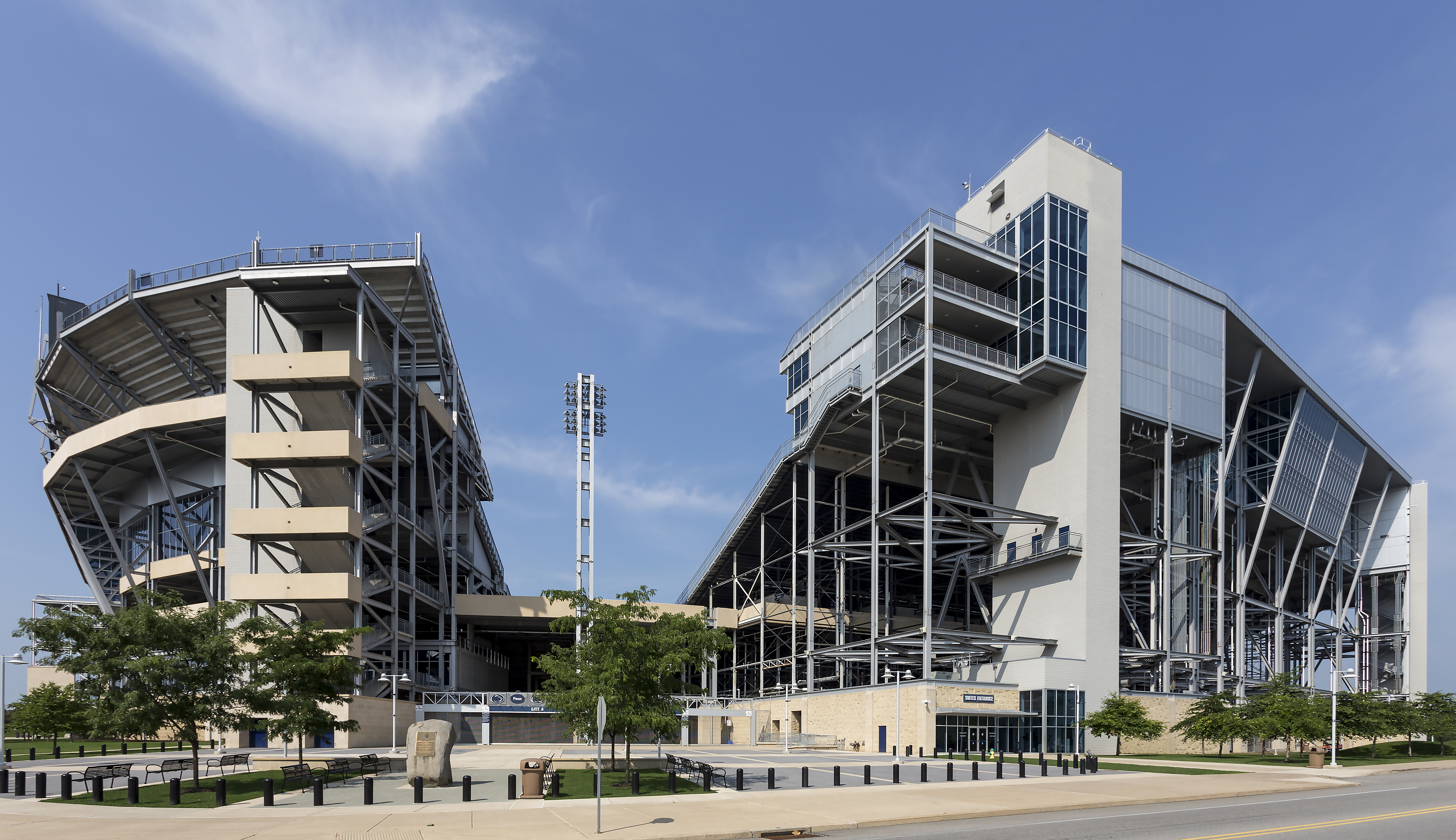
Beaver Stadium seen from the east in August 2014

The stadium has been expanded six times, reflecting Penn State's rise to national prominence under Joe Paterno, then the team's head coach, more than doubling in size in the process. Expansions in 1972 brought capacity to 57,538. Another expansion in 1976 increased capacity to 60,203. In 1978, 16,000 seats were added when the stadium was cut into sections and raised on hydraulic lifts, allowing the insertion of seating along the inner ring of the stadium where the track had previously been located, raising capacity to 76,639. This expansion is particularly noticeable, as there's a distinct color change when crossing from the original, New Beaver Field steel grandstands onto the newer, stone and concrete additions. In 1980, maximum capacity increased to 83,770. Beaver Stadium hosted its first night football game on September 25, 1982, when Penn State played the University of Nebraska Cornhuskers. While the game was scheduled for a 3:45 p.m. kickoff, CBS anticipated the contest would conclude after sunset and contracted Musco Lighting to provide temporary portable lights for the broadcast. The Nittany Lions won the game 27–24, a victory that proved pivotal in the program's first national championship season. The game is particularly noted for a controversial 15-yard sideline completion from Todd Blackledge to tight end Mike McCloskey during the final minute; despite replays suggesting McCloskey had stepped out of bounds before the catch, the play stood and set up the winning touchdown. Permanent lighting was not installed at the stadium until 1984.

In 1985, walkways were added around the tops of the end zones and entry ramps at the stadium's corners resulted in lowering the capacity to 83,370. An expansion was completed for the 1991 football season, placing an upper deck addition over the north end zone and raising capacity to 93,967.

A major and somewhat controversial construction project took place in 2001, raising the stadium's total capacity to 107,282. An upper deck was added to the south end of the stadium, blocking the view of neighboring Mount Nittany (which had sentimental value for some fans), but making Beaver Stadium the second-largest stadium in the nation, behind Michigan Stadium in Ann Arbor, Michigan.

In 2006, the stadium underwent major structural and aesthetic upgrades. Old steel beams supporting the upper seats in the east, north and west were replaced and strengthened, and new railing was installed, stronger than the old railing which collapsed following the 2005 Ohio State game.

In 2007, over 22,000 student tickets sold out in 59 minutes. In 2008, when tickets were sold by grade, tickets allotted for junior students sold out in 90 seconds, and those for sophomores and freshmen sold out in under three minutes each.

In 2011, the stadium capacity was reduced from 107,282 seats to 106,572 to comply with the Americans with Disabilities Act.

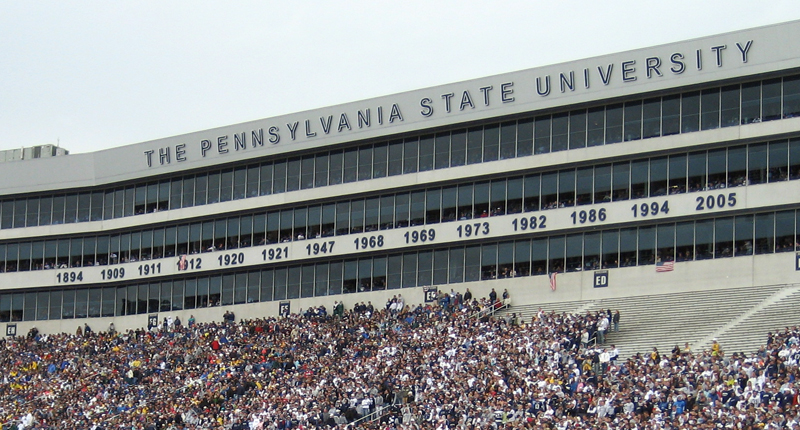
The suites on the east end of the stadium in September 2016

The appearance of the stadium has been enhanced with the addition of large blue letters spelling out "The Pennsylvania State University" on the west-facing suites, and a list of Penn State's undefeated, national championship, and Big Ten championship years underneath. 2012 is the exception, which was added to this list during the November 24, 2012 game against Wisconsin to honor the team that played after sanctions were passed down during the aftermath of the Jerry Sandusky scandal. Nine markers depicting the various traditions of Beaver Stadium, including the Penn State Blue Band, the student section, and the blue buses which bring the team to the stadium, have been placed around the stadium as well. In late October, the walls surrounding the field were refaced with Pennsylvania limestone. An iron gate has replaced the old chain-link face at the players' entrance into the stadium. On the new gate the words "PENN STATE" appear in blue.

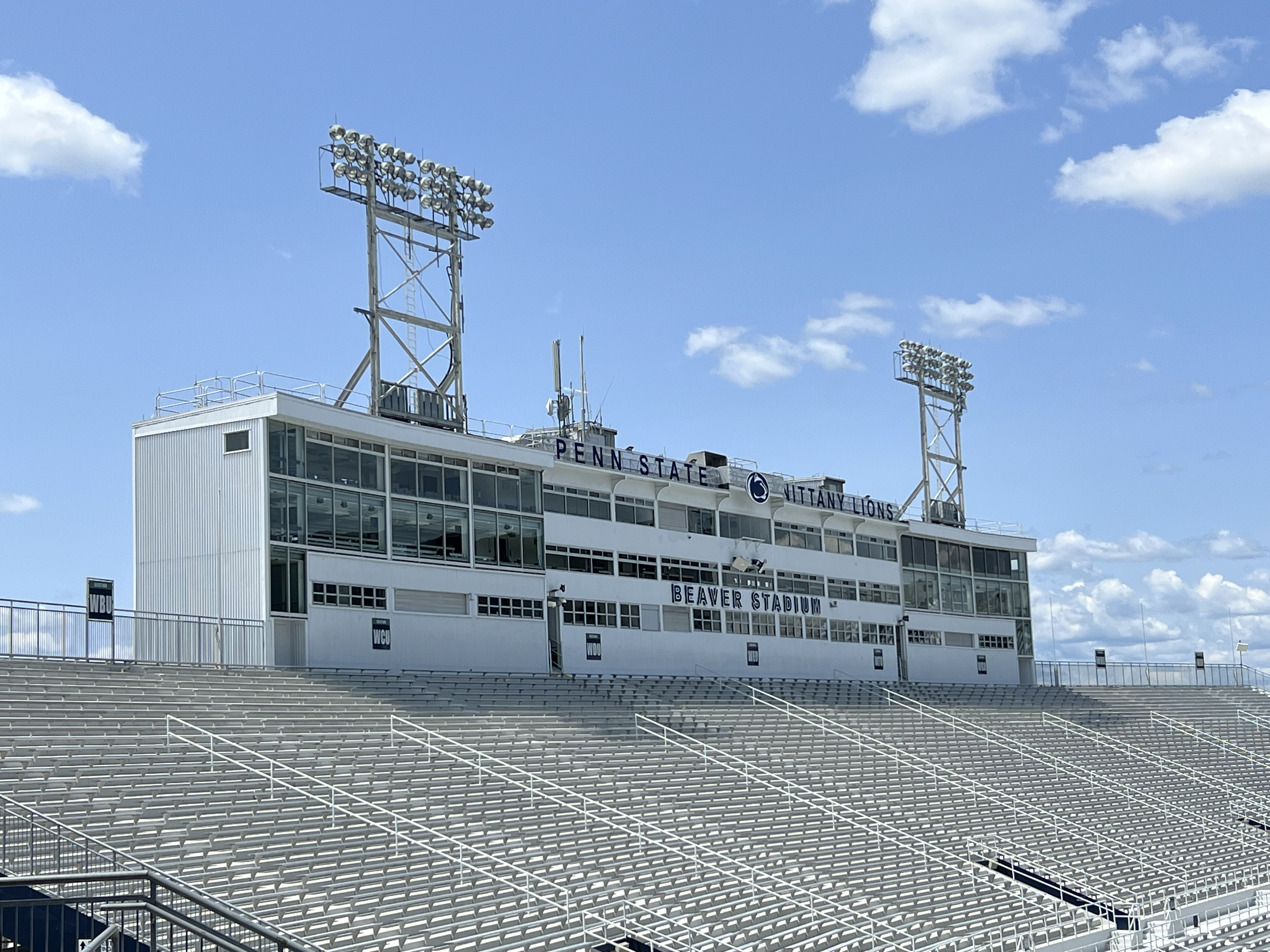
The former press box on the west end of the stadium in July 2023

The Penn State Office of Physical Plant and Athletic Department expanded the north and south video boards to HD video boards and because parts were no longer available for the old boards. The area of the new video screens dedicated to game replays and game-related video is much larger than the screens they replaced. The renovation expanded the size of the video boards by eliminating the current game clock and lamp matrix display. The boards were only the second of their kind at the time of their installation and are 4K UHD. The project was completed prior to the first home game of the 2014 season. The boards cost approx. $10 million. Located on the back of each scoreboard is an LED Nittany Lion logo that is illuminated at night. Starting with the 2015 season, fireworks are launched from the top of each scoreboard when the team takes the field.

In the fall semester of 2015, university officials stated that they are seeking options to renovate or replace Beaver Stadium in the next 10 years. Officials state that there is a recognized need in an upgrade in the facilities. The stadium remains antiquated, despite multiple expansions and the additions of luxury boxes and HD scoreboards. Outdated plumbing requires complete winterization each November. Elevators are small and sluggish while concourses are narrow. The stadium lacks concession options and still uses bleachers. The limitations prevent wider use of the venue; the university would like to expand the number of events held at Beaver Stadium, such as major concerts and a long-discussed potential hosting of the NHL Winter Classic. Many fans are opposed to replacing Beaver Stadium due to the history and tradition but many agree that there is a need for renovation.

On September 8, 2021, Penn State dedicated a Chair of Honor for all prisoners of war/missing in action (POW/MIA) service members in the "SLU" section of the stadium, above the student section, where it will remain empty in perpetuity. This chair was unveiled during the Nittany Lions' first home football game of the season against Ball State on September 11.

Beaver Stadium exterior in October 2026

On May 21, 2024, the Penn State Board of Trustees approved a renovation of Beaver Stadium, which will grow revenue-generating opportunities, transform the fan and community experience, and fuel the future funding for all 31 athletics programs at Penn State. The vote was 26-2, with three abstaining. The approved renovations will enable year-round use of Beaver Stadium, further driving economic growth and development in the surrounding region. Including the first stage of the Beaver Stadium renovation, which was approved in May 2023, the total project will cost no more than $700 million and will be completed before the 2027 college football season. This multi-year project is financed and paid for entirely by Intercollegiate Athletics. A part of the renovation, dedicated to the scoreboards, was completed before the Kent State game.

On the morning of January 4, 2025, the west end press box was demolished with controlled explosives. It was originally built at New Beaver Field and was moved to the current Beaver Stadium in 1959. It was significantly expanded in 1980.

On March 10, 2025, the Penn State Board of Trustees announced the sale of the stadium's naming rights to West Shore Home, a Mechanicsburg, Pennsylvania-based home remodeling company owned by Penn State alumni. The 15-year deal officially renamed the stadium to West Shore Home Field at Beaver Stadium.

== Attendance records ==
An aerial view of Beaver Stadium in July 2026

A record crowd of 114,419 witnessed Penn State's 31-23 loss to USC, on October 10, 2026.

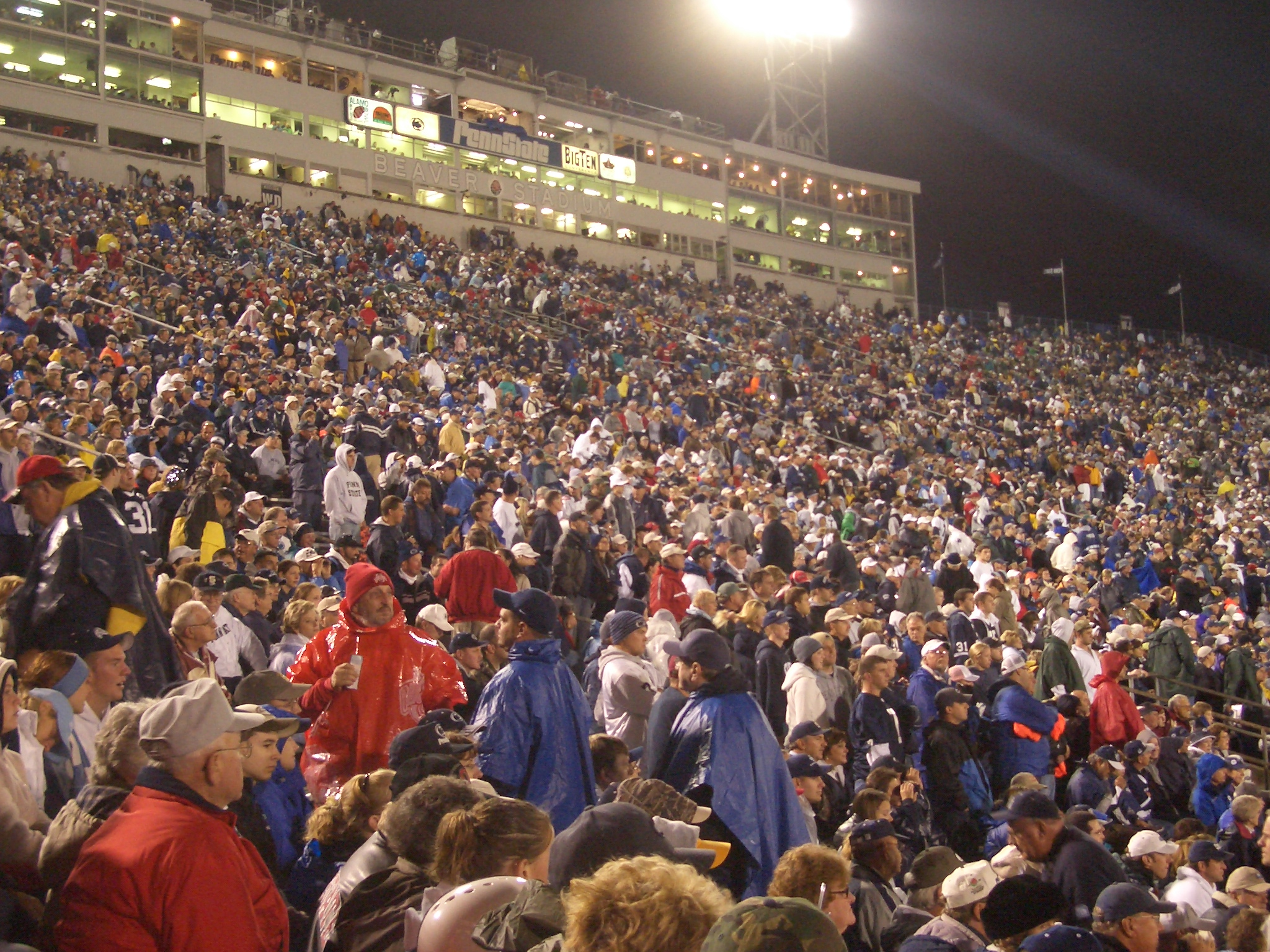
On October 8, 2005, 109,839 attendees at Beaver Stadium witnessed the Nittany Lions defeat Ohio State 17 to 10, in what was then the second-largest crowd in college football history.

In 2002, Penn State set an NCAA record for most fans to ever watch a college football team over the course of a single season at home. Beaver Stadium hosted 8 games in 2002, and averaged 107,239 per game totaling what was at the time an NCAA record of 857,911 in total home attendance. Penn State averaged 95,977 fans in attendance both home and away over the 13 game schedule which broke the all time full season attendance NCAA record at 1,247,707 spectators over the course of the 2002 campaign.

=== All-time Beaver Stadium records ===
Rank	Attendance	Date	Game result
1	114,419	October 10, 2026	Penn State 23, USC 31
2	111,030	November 2, 2024	Penn State 13, Ohio State 20
3	111,019	September 27, 2025	Penn State 24, Oregon 30 (2OT)
4	110,889	September 29, 2018	Penn State 26, Ohio State 27
5	110,856	November 11, 2023	Penn State 15, Michigan 24
6	110,830	September 23, 2023	Penn State 31, Iowa 0
7	110,823	October 21, 2017	Penn State 42, Michigan 13
8	110,753	September 14, 2002	Penn State 40, Nebraska 7
9	110,747	September 2, 2023	Penn State 38, West Virginia 15
10	110,669	October 19, 2019	Penn State 28, Michigan 21
11	110,233	November 9, 2024	Penn State 35 Washington 6
12	110,134	October 27, 2007	Penn State 17, Ohio State 37
13	110,078	September 8, 2007	Penn State 31, Notre Dame 10
14	110,047	October 5, 2024	Penn State 27, UCLA 11
15	110,033	November 7, 2009	Penn State 7, Ohio State 24
16	110,017	October 18, 2008	Penn State 46, Michigan 17
17	109,958	September 18, 2021	Penn State 28, Auburn 20
18	109,911	September 28, 2024	Penn State 21, Illinois 7
19	109,898	September 9, 2017	Penn State 33, Pittsburgh 14
20	109,865	November 5, 2005	Penn State 35, Wisconsin 14
21	109,845	November 22, 2008	Penn State 49, Michigan State 18
22	109,839	October 8, 2005	Penn State 17, Ohio State 10
23	109,813	October 22, 2022	Penn State 45, Minnesota 17

=== Attendance record by Beaver Stadium capacity ===
Capacity	Record	Broken Date	Game result
46,284	50,144	November 21, 1964	Pittsburgh 0, Penn State 28
48,284	52,713	October 11, 1969	West Virginia 0, Penn State 20
57,723	61,325	September 13, 1975	Stanford 14, Penn State 34
60,203	62,554	September 17, 1977	Houston 14, Penn State 31
76,639	78,019	November 4, 1978	Maryland 3, Penn State 27
83,370	86,309	October 22, 1983	West Virginia 23, Penn State 41
93,967	97,498	November 9, 1997	Michigan 34, Penn State 8
107,282	110,753	September 14, 2002	Nebraska 7, Penn State 40
106,572	111,030	November 2, 2024	Ohio State 20, Penn State 13
106,304	114,419	October 10, 2026	USC 31, Penn State 23

== Traditions ==
=== Chants ===
"WE ARE!"..."PENN STATE!" is perhaps the most well-known chant across campus; "We Are Penn State" conveys the university's sense of unity and school pride. At Beaver Stadium, the chant is often relayed across the stadium in a "WE ARE!"..."PENN STATE!". Penn State call and response, with each side of the grandstand chanting one half of the motto. This is typically followed by a similar "THANK YOU!"..."YOU'RE WELCOME!" chant. It is also featured in Penn State's White Out games, which use Zombie Nation's Kernkraft 400 as the fight song instead of Fight On, State.

"Let's Go, P-S-U" - A more recently started chant which plays during a performance of The Hey Song by the Penn State Blue Band prior to every game.

=== Tailgating ===
Tailgating is very popular outside Beaver Stadium. Alcohol is permitted in all areas around Beaver Stadium and is sold inside the stadium on home football games, as of 2022. In August 2019, Penn State was ranked #15 by tailgater magazine for the "tailgate culture" that surrounds Beaver Stadium on gameday. The magazine stated that "win or lose, the university offers an incredible tailgate environment" for over 100,000 fans, referencing traditions related to Penn State football such as camping outside Beaver Stadium for Nittanyville to making ice cream stops at the Berkey Creamery.

=== Student section "S-Zone" ===
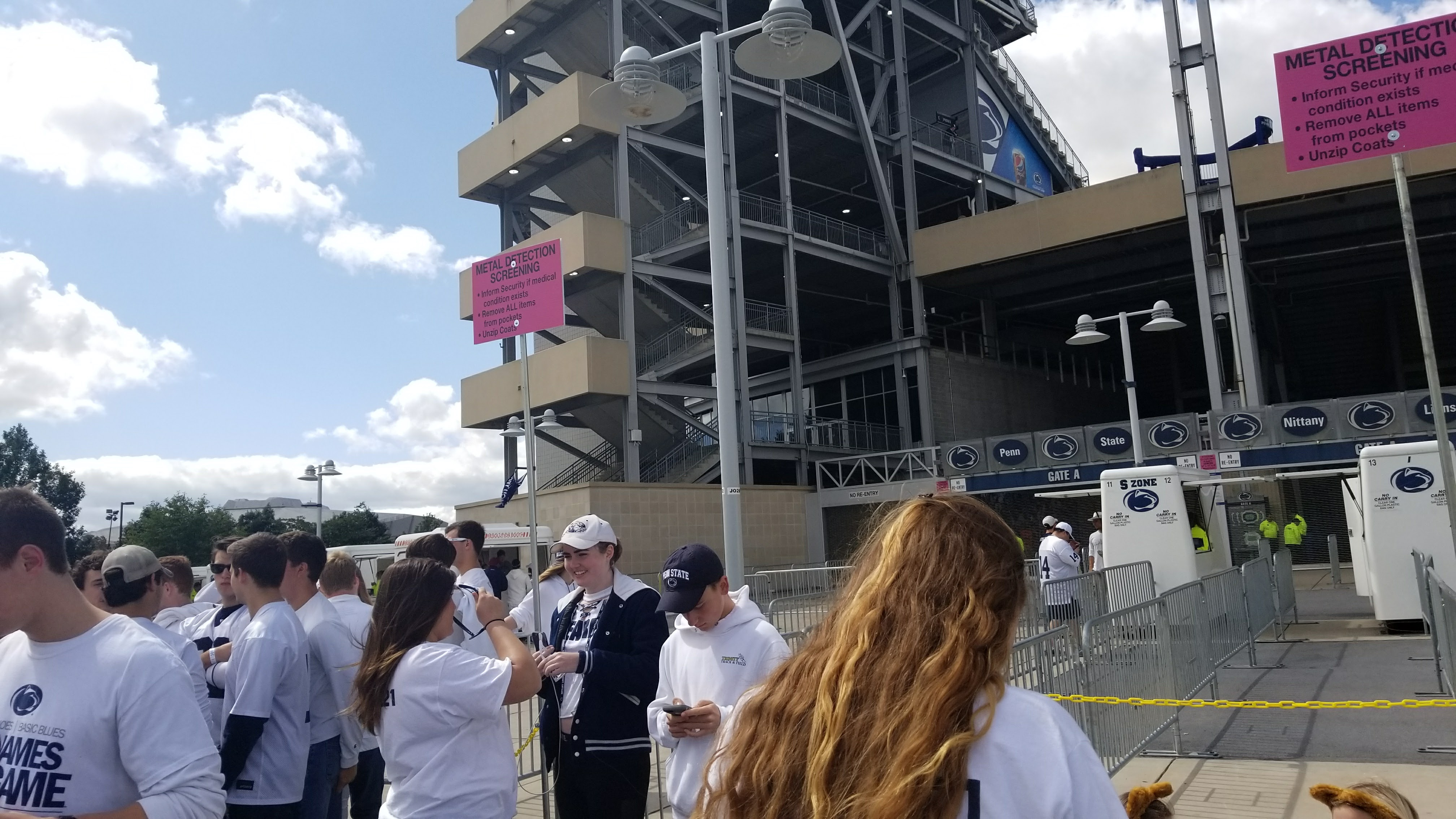
Students wait at The "S-Zone" entrance outside Gate A in September 2017

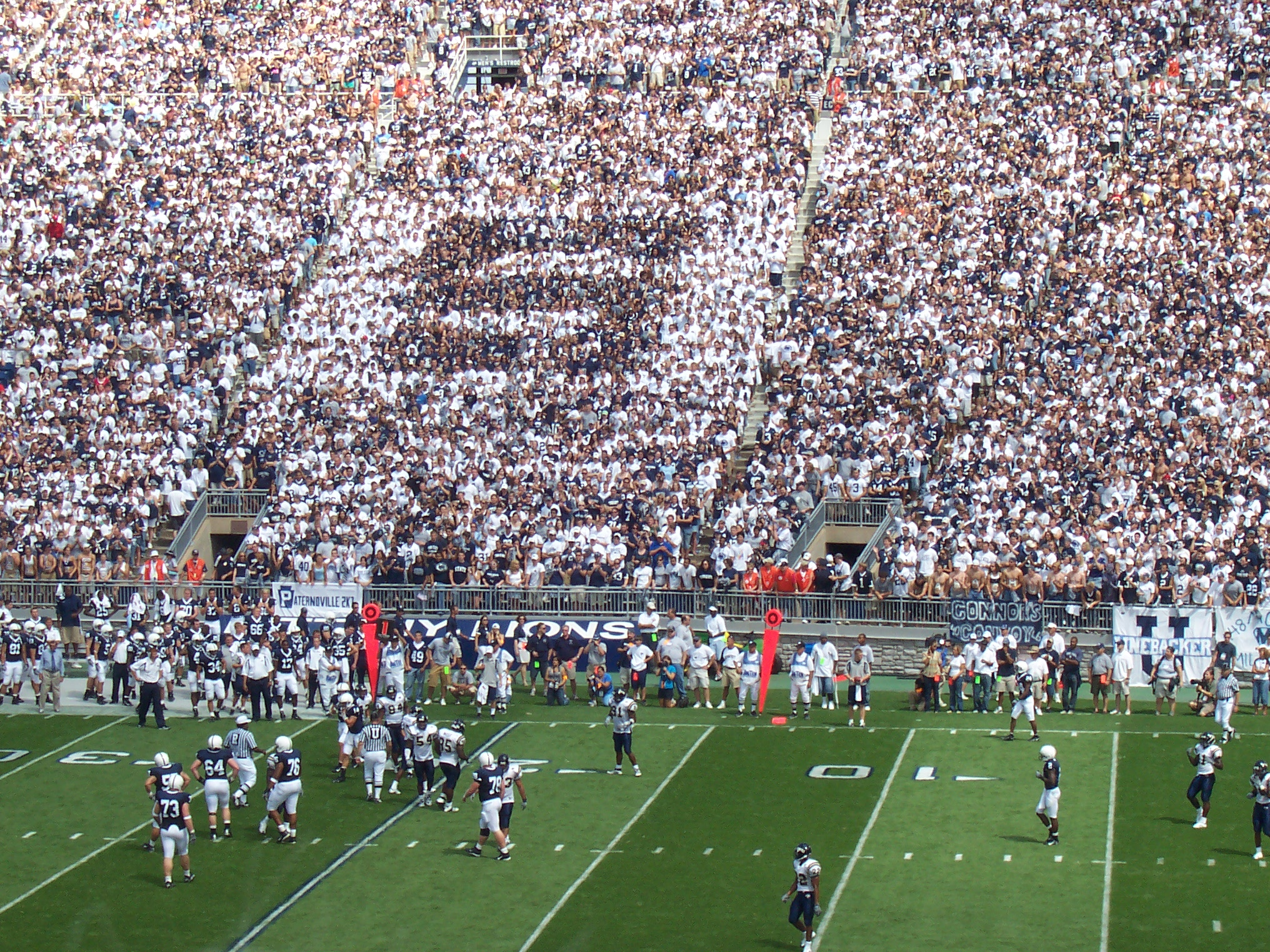
The "S-Zone", dressed to form the letter "S" in September 2007

The "S-Zone" within the student section is another tradition at Beaver Stadium. A small section behind the end zone are all given white and blue shirts supplied by the Pennsylvania State University Lion Ambassadors to create an "S" in the student section. The "S-Zone" was moved from the 20 yard line to its current location at the beginning of the 2011 football season, as the student section was shifted over to between the 10 yard lines. For the 2008, 2011, 2013, 2018, and 2023 Homecoming Games, the "S-Zone" was black and pink, in honor of the original Penn State colors. On April 21, 2007, for the Annual Blue and White Game (Spring Scrimmage), the "S-Zone" was converted to a "VT-Zone", in honor of the victims of the massacre that took place on April 16, 2007, at Virginia Tech.

=== Nittanyville ===
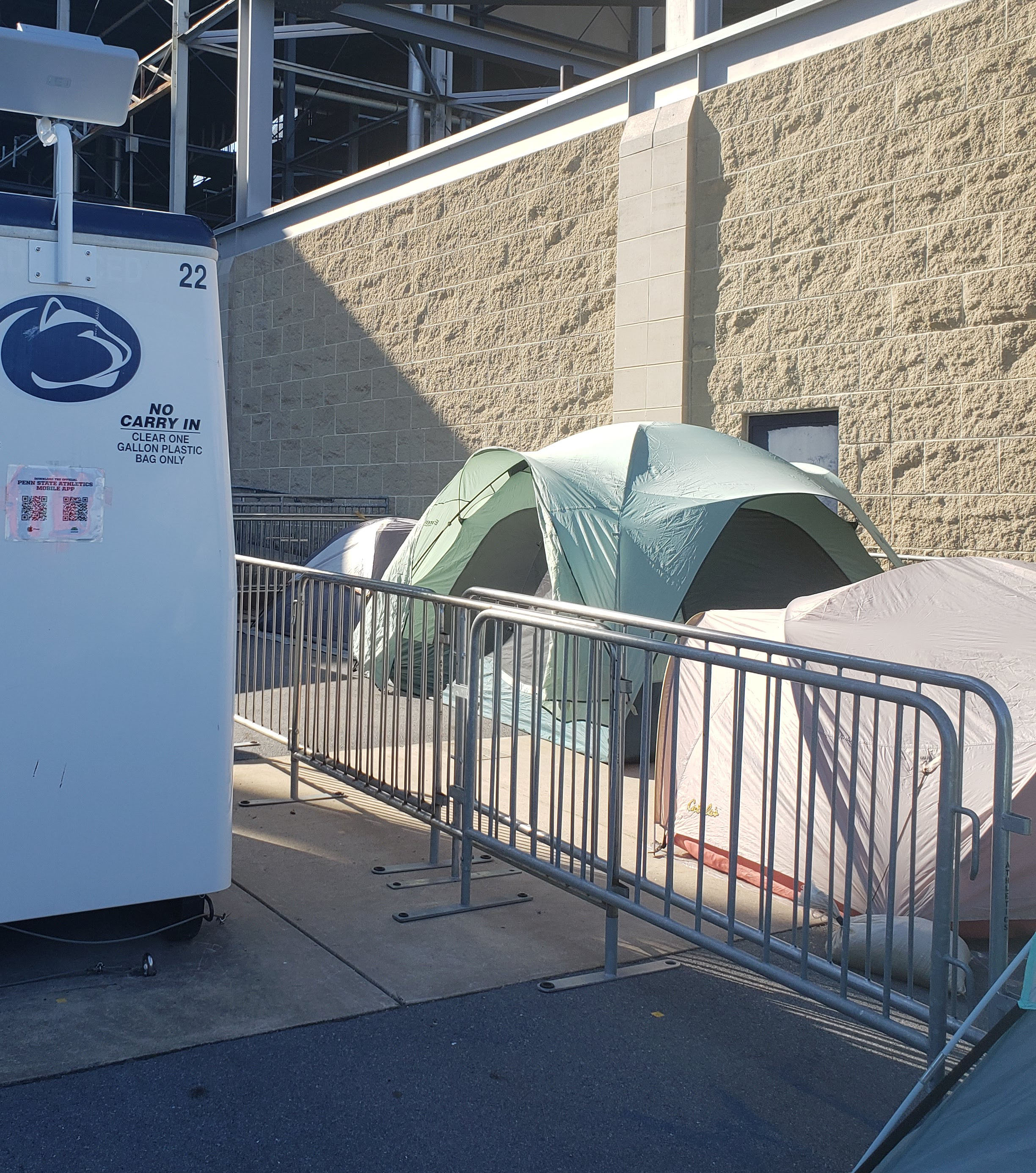
"Nittanyville" tents a few days before the White Out game against Ohio State in November 2019

Starting with the October 2005 game against Ohio State, students have camped out outside Gate A to obtain good seats for home games; "Nittanyville" is a recognized university club with rules of conduct. It was originally known as "Paternoville". During whiteout games, a special week-long camping starts on Monday instead of the usual Wednesday or Thursday.

=== White Out games ===
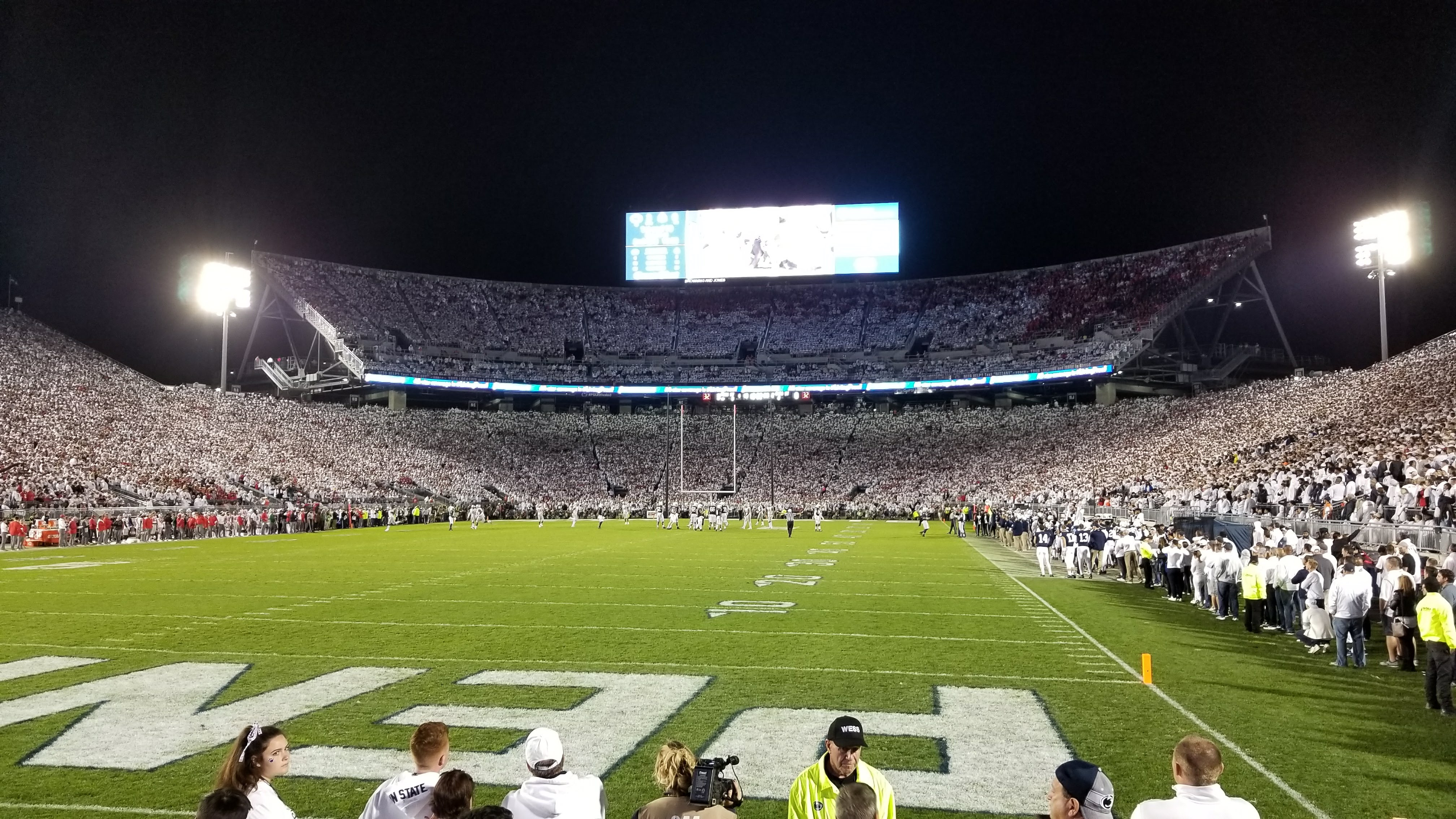
The 2018 Whiteout game against Ohio State

After failed experiments with "Code Blue" during the down year of 2004, a localized version of the "Winnipeg White Out" made national headlines during the 2005 game versus Ohio State. In this game, despite 40 °F (4 °C) temperatures and a misty rain, nearly every student, along with many other fans, wore a white shirt to the game, creating a sea of white. This was deemed a success, as the student section was declared "The best in the country." by ESPN analyst Kirk Herbstreit, and the Nittany Lions won the game in an intense defensive battle, 17–10. The student section was widely credited with aiding the defense, which kept the Buckeyes' future Heisman Trophy winning quarterback, Troy Smith, in check by intercepting a pass and recovering a decisive fumble in the final minutes. Smith was forced to call several timeouts during the game due to inability to communicate with his offense on the field.

In 2007, for the Notre Dame game, a full-stadium "White House" was declared. While it is widely believed that this change was a result of the National Hockey League's Phoenix Coyotes notifying the university that the phrase "White Out" was trademarked by the franchise during their time as the Winnipeg Jets, the "White House" moniker was invented to remind the crowd that everyone, and not just the student section, was to wear white. The newly christened "White House" was also deemed a success, as nearly every Penn State fan in attendance wore white, and the Lions won, 31–10. In 2008, the "White House" was met with similar success, a 38–24 win over Illinois. From 2012 to 2019, the full-stadium "White Out" games have been against either Ohio State or Michigan. In 2021, the first Southeastern Conference (SEC) team, the Auburn Tigers played during the "White Out", the Nittany Lions won 28–20.

=== Zombie Nation ===
Zombie Nation is a tradition that was started during the 2004 football season. After the Nittany Lions make a big play, (typically on defense) the stadium blasts the song "Kernkraft 400" by Zombie Nation which ignites 107,000 into a frenzied blur all bouncing up and down in unison, waving towels and shakers wildly chanting "WE ARE PENN STATE!" during the break in the melody of the song. The tradition gained national attention in 2005, after Penn State's 17–10 victory over Ohio State, which at the time, delivered the second highest audience for a regular season college football game ever on ESPN. Zombie Nation along with the "Penn State Whiteout", have been direct influencers of Beaver Stadium being home to what many consider the best student section in college football. Since the tradition began, both Zombie Nation and the "Whiteout" have since spread to encompass the entire stadium.

=== Tunnel entrance ===
The tunnel entrance is a Nittany Lions tradition in which the head coach leads the team from the locker room under the South side of the stadium to the tunnel to a closed metal gate reading "PENN STATE" in bold Arial font. When the team arrives at the gate, the Nittany Lion opens the gate and motions for the team to walk through it, as if welcoming the team to the field. The team then lingers until four minutes are left on the pregame clock, and then the head coach leads the team through the tunnel created by the Blue Band.

=== Fast and slow wave ===
The Penn State Student Section initiates a wave during sporting events. After the wave passes around the stadium twice, the student section slows down the wave to about a fourth the speed of the normal wave. After the slow wave passes, the wave speeds up to over twice the speed of the normal wave. The wave has, on occasion, been reversed in direction following the fast wave.

=== Blue Band traditions ===
==== The Flip ====
After the Penn State Blue Band has entered the field and played the first eight bars of "The Nittany Lion", the Blue Bands Drum Major does a high-stepping, stiff-legged sprint in between rows of band members from the goal line to the 50 yard line, where they do a front flip. Legend states that if the drum major lands the flip, the team will win that afternoon. They then perform another flip while running towards the end zone. After they stand back up, they and the Nittany Lion, who is holding the baton, take five high-steps toward each other, meeting 5 yards deep in the end zone. The Lion and Drum Major both place both hands on the baton in alternating order (in the same manner children choosing teams with a baseball bat would) and then throw the baton onto the ground. They then salute each other, embrace arms, and then both excitedly run towards the student section, where they are cheered enthusiastically.

==== Floating Lions ====
The Blue Band performs "The Nittany Lion" and makes its way from its "PSU" formation to roll into spelling "LIONS" as it marches across the field. Once reaching the other side, the band reverses the "LIONS" to be readable to the east side of the stadium, while playing "Fight On, State". This is known as the "trademark drill" of the Blue Band.

== See also ==
- List of NCAA Division I FBS football stadiums
- Lists of stadiums
