= John Ozell =

English translator and accountant

John Ozell (died 15 October 1743) was an English translator and accountant who became an adversary to Jonathan Swift and Alexander Pope.

He moved to London from the country at around the age of twenty and entered an accounting firm, where he was successful in managing the accounts of several large entities, including the City of London itself. He was a Whig and probably a dissenter who associated with the prominent figures of the whig establishment in the 18th century. He was particularly associated with Joseph Addison and the "little senate" that met at Button's Coffee House in Covent Garden.

He was financially well off, due to his accounting work. He died on 15 October 1743, a lifelong bachelor.

== Works ==
Ozell taught himself several contemporary languages and had a good grounding in Latin and Greek from school. He began to act as a translator in addition to his work in accounting. Ozell's translations were not very strict, but they were of a better quality than those of his contemporaries.

In 1705, Jonathan Swift's Battle of the Books had appeared as a preface to A Tale of a Tub. The Battle of the Books was part of a general quarrel of the ancients and the moderns, where the question was between ancient authors (Homer, Virgil, Horace, and Aristotle) and contemporary ones and whether contemporary philosophy and science had surpassed what could be gathered from the classics. Swift's version of the Battle has all contemporary authors, and he names several of them, swept away by the ancient authors that they glossed. The Battle was based on Le Lutrin by Boileau, and Ozell performed his own translation of Le Lutrin in 1708. In his version, the contemporaries being blasted away were Tory authors, and, in particular, William Wycherley.

Boileau was a great favorite of the "ancients" camp and the Scriblerus Club in particular. In 1711 through 1713, Ozell published The Works of Monsieur Boileau. He thus took the French neoclassicist for the Whig side. This infuriated the Tory defenders of Wycherley, and both Jonathan Swift and Alexander Pope struck back at Ozell. In 1708, Pope wrote Epigram, Occasion'd by Ozell's Translation of Bioleau's Lutrin and said, "those were slander'd most whom Ozell praised." Swift satirized Ozell in the Introduction to Polite Conversation, and Pope mentioned Ozell again in The Dunciad. In that poem, Dulness shows her champion her powers of conception and

"How, with less reading than makes felons 'scape,
Less human genius than God gives an ape,
Small thanks to France and none to Rome or Greece,
A past, vamp'd, future, old, reviv'd, new piece,
'Twixt Plautus, Fletcher, Congreve, and Corneille,
Can make a Cibber, Johnson, or Ozell." (I. 235-40)

In 1712, he translated Anne Dacier's French retelling of the Iliad into blank verse. He was also at pains to express his anti-Catholicism with a translation of the life of Veronica of Milan, whom he termed a saint, in 1716 (just after a Jacobite uprising), and he took a political stance by translating Paul de Rapin's Dissertation sur les Whig et les Torys with a pro-Whig slant.

In 1728, the Dunciad Variorum appeared, and, the same year, Richard Bundy published a translation of Histoire romaine, depuis la fondation de Rome, a work Ozell was planning to translate. Ozell wrote a long treatise enumerating Bundy's mistakes and Pope's villainy, and he took out an ad to attack his enemies.

In 1738, Ozell translated L'Embarras des richesses (The Embarrassment of Riches) by Léonor Jean Christine Soulas d'Allainval, in so doing popularising the English phrase 'an embarrassment of riches'.
