= Lion Fanfare and Downfield =

"Lion Fanfare and Downfield" is a fight song medley of Pennsylvania State University. It is performed at every home football game by the Penn State Blue Band, during their pregame show.

The "Lion Fanfare" is performed with a fanfare step; it follows the traditional Blue Band high step, but the changing between feet is more crisp, and performed at half time. The piece consists of a high-intensity fanfare performed with a 45-degree snap to the left, 90-degree snap to the right, and another 45-degree snap back to the left. The fanfare segues directly into "Downfield", during which the entire band marches to midfield to the tune of "The Nittany Lion".
