= Florence Atherton Spalding =

American composer and music teacher (1859–1933)

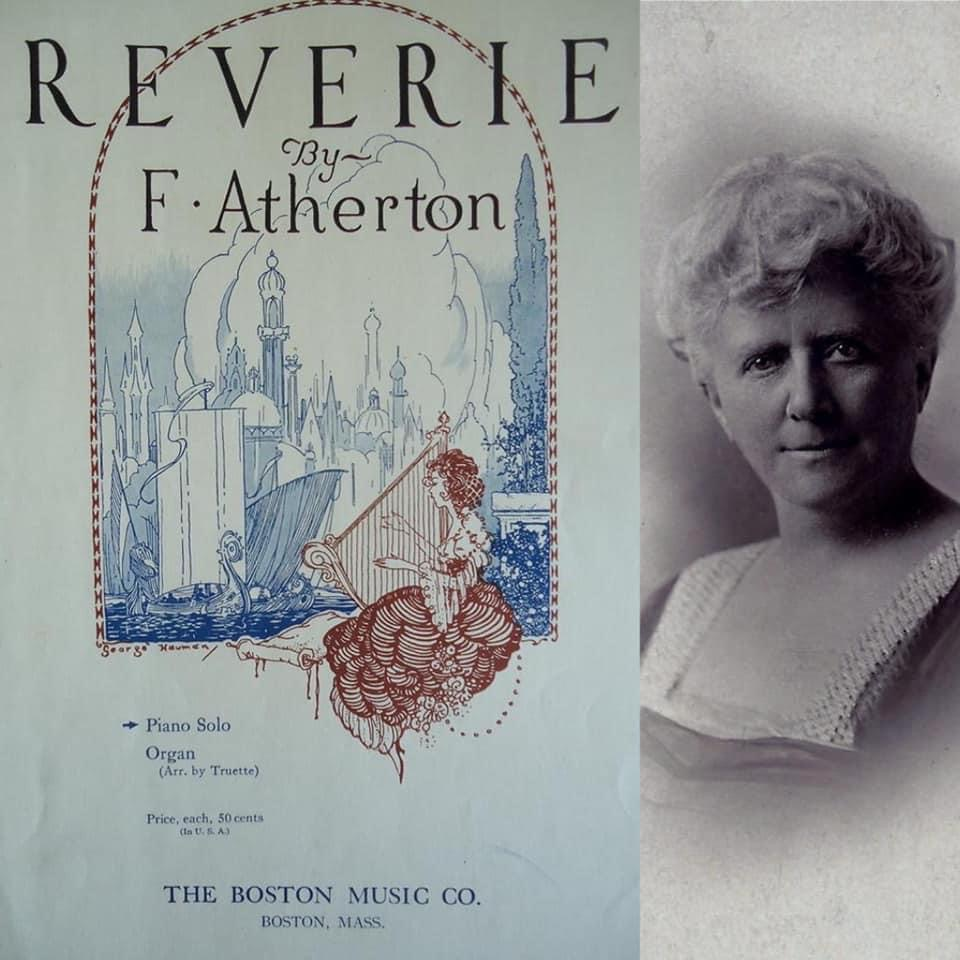
- Spalding and the sheet music to her "Reverie", Boston Music Co., pre-1910
- Born: Florence Atherton Faxon; September 10, 1859; Boston, Massachusetts, U.S.
- Died: December 13, 1933 (aged 74); Lynn, Massachusetts, U.S.
- Occupations: Composer; music teacher
- Years active: 1881–1916
- Style: Parlor music
- Spouse: George Frederick Spalding (m. 1885)
- Children: 5
- Family: Percy Lee Atherton (cousin)

Florence Atherton Spalding (September 10, 1859 – December 13, 1933) was an American composer and music teacher from Boston, Massachusetts.

== Early life ==
She was born Florence A. Faxon in 1859, the daughter of Edward Faxon (1824–1886) and Eliza Otis Pope (1824–1869), a musically gifted and prosperous family with connections that descended from Myles Standish and other colonial figureheads.

Spalding grew up in an environment that played a big emphasis on musical composition. Her father was a member of the Handel and Haydn Society of Boston and was an accomplished tenor singer, and later served as director. By profession, he was a dealer in the supplies of piano manufacture. Since her father was a key member of the Handel and Haydn Society, she would have witnessed the preparations for the celebrations marking the effective date of the Emancipation Proclamation on January 1, 1863, followed by the society's golden jubilee in 1865, which consisted of a five-day festival of nine concerts, employing a chorus of 700. Two years later, the New England Conservatory of Music was established.

At the age of nine, her mother died, and, in 1870, her father remarried to Lucretia Eddy Holland. Spalding focused her effort into writing music. When she was 13, in 1872, the World's Peace Jubilee and International Musical Festival was taking place in Boston.

== Career ==
By 1881, at the age of 20, she had been published by Oliver Ditson, founder of Oliver Ditson and Company, one of the major American music publishing houses of the late 19th century. Under the name F. Atherton, (Note: Many of Spalding's compositions were initially published as "F. Atherton", prior to being copyrighted by her as Florence Atherton Spalding. Her use of the Atherton name had caused some confusion for biographical researchers of the Philadelphia composer Frank Peabody Atherton, the son of George W. Atherton.) she published some of her earliest compositions, such as "St. Botolph March".

By now, she was a prominent music teacher in Boston and an acclaimed composer of pieces for piano, organ and voice. She chose a professional name that wasn't her birth name. She continued to publish her works under the name Florence Atherton.

Atherton was her middle name, a legacy inherited from her maternal ancestors. During her formative years, Samuel Atherton (1815–1895) was highly involved in the Stoughton Musical Society, the oldest in the country, which had been set up by a number of male singers in honor of her great grandfather William Billings. Samuel Atherton, like many in her family, had moved from Stoughton, Massachusetts, to Boston. He was instrumental in building up Boston reputation in the arts during this period, particularly once elected to the Massachusetts House of Representatives in 1867.

After Ditson's death in 1888, she was published by another Boston house, Allan & Co., immediately followed in 1901 by C. W. Thompson & Co., a relationship which lasted the rest of her professional career. Her "Reverie" for piano became a lasting success. It was then arranged for orchestra and organ.

She later, upon marriage at age 26, published under the name of Florence Atherton Spalding. Less than 12 months later, her father died. As Mrs. Spalding, she would have followed the inauguration of the Peabody Mason Concerts in 1891. Her composition "Liebestraum" was submitted, allegedly without her knowledge, to the World's Columbian Exposition of 1893, which was referred to at the time as the Chicago World's Fair. Her composition was well received and she was awarded a medal and diploma. By 1901, she was widely known across the country, with the widening availability of parlor sheet music.

One of her legacies has been as the composer of music to accompany words and poem by others, such as "Bewildering Eyes", words by Thomas Ball; "Sing Me a Low Sweet Song", a poem by Hildegarde Hawthorne; "Challenge of the Rose", words by Thomas Bailey Aldrich; and "Tipperary in the Spring", a poem by Denis Aloysius McCarthy. All were first published in with musical compositions by Spalding, between 1898 and 1905.

She gave a number of lectures on the life of Richard Wagner, in conjunction with Kate Wardell Buck, the wife of Benjamin Buck.

Spalding later composed the music for a New York operetta called Lady Nancy, which ran during the 1904 season, although Lady Nancy had been performed as early as 1896 in the Maugus Club Theatricals. Spalding continued to write and publish new compositions up to 1916.

Her musical accompaniments in the form of a duet, with a reader and Spalding on piano, continued to be programmed events around a number of towns in Massachusetts.

=== Performances of her compositions by others ===
- Roland Hayes: During his 1916 performance at Boston's Jordan Hall he played "Lieberatraum" ("Dream of Love"), supported by violinist Wesley Howard and Lawrence Benjamin Brown on the keyboard. He continued to play her songs during his long career.
- Gustav Strube: During the 1901 summer season at the Boston Pops Orchestra in the newly inaugurated Boston Symphony Hall, he delivered one of her waltz compositions called "Traumwelt: Dream-World".

=== Incomplete list of compositions ===
- "St. Botolphs March" (1881)
- "Reverie" (1890)
- "O Liebestraum" ("Dream of Love")
- "Bewildering Eyes"
- "Challenge of the Rose"
- "The Way to Sleepy Town"
- "Tipperary in the Spring"
- "Traumwelt: Dream-World" (1901)
- "March On! Over There" (1918)
- "Norwegian Romance" (1916)

== Personal life ==
She married George Frederick Spalding (1859–1946; of Newton, Massachusetts), at the age of 26, in Lynn, Massachusetts, on November 18, 1885. He was a Harvard graduate of 1883 who commenced a shoe manufacturing business immediately after completing his studies and became a successful Boston merchant.

The couple had five children: Atherton Spalding (1887–1955); Margaret "Peggy" Spalding (1898–1917), who committed suicide; Rosamond Spalding (1891–1976); Robert E. Spalding (1893–1966); and the youngest, John Varnum Spalding (1897–1979), who would be the associate justice of the Massachusetts Supreme Judicial Court from 1944 to 1971.

She died on December 13, 1933, after a short illness, and was buried at Pine Grove Cemetery, Lynn, Massachusetts.

Her musical ancestors included William Billings, a composer of marches during the Revolutionary period. Her cousin was the renowned Boston composer Percy Lee Atherton. Both had compositions at the turn of the 1900s which were performed by the Boston Pops Orchestra.
