= Frank Peabody Atherton =

American musician and composer (1868–1911)

- Born: January 24, 1868; Virden, Illinois, U.S.
- Died: June 16, 1911 (aged 43)
- Occupation: Composer

Francis Peabody Atherton (January 24, 1868 – June 16, 1911) (Note: His date of birth and date of death in the February 1912 issue of The Etude are inaccurate.) was an American musician, composer and music teacher at State College, Pennsylvania. (Note: This composer is not to be confused with another American composer, Florence Atherton Spalding due to having her shortened name F. Atherton printed in her early published works.)

== Career ==
He settled in State College, Pennsylvania, since boyhood after his father accepted a position in Pennsylvania State College. One of his initial fames came from his experience of being the music director of the Pennsylvania State University Glee Club. Atherton was well known as a composer for instructive works for piano and violin as his profession included being a music teacher. After his experience from the Spanish-American War, he became the director for the municipal band in Alliance, Ohio, between 1905 and 1906, in which it "underwent a complete change, bringing in new methods and new talent".

== Personal ==
He was born in Virden, Illinois, under the birth name of Franklin P. Atherton, the son of George W. Atherton and Frances “Fannie” Wright Darusmont Washburn, of Plympton, Massachusetts. His father, a Civil War veteran, for some time was a professor of political science at Rutgers University. In 1882, he moved to Philadelphia when his father served as the 7th president of Pennsylvania State University (then Pennsylvania State College) from 1882 to 1906. He was an older brother to the baseball player, Charlie Atherton.
