= American Literature (journal) =

- Discipline: American literature, literary history, literary criticism and bibliography
- Language: English
- Edited by: Priscilla Wald, Matthew A. Taylor

Publication details
- History: 1929–present
- Publisher: Duke University Press and the Modern Literature Association (United States)
- Frequency: Quarterly

Standard abbreviations
- ISO 4: Am. Lit.

Indexing
- ISSN: 0002-9831 (print); 1527-2117 (web)
- LCCN: 30020216
- JSTOR: 00029831
- OCLC no.: 1480320

Links
- Journal homepage; Current issue; Project Muse (archives)

American Literature is a literary journal published by Duke University Press. It is sponsored by the American Literature Section of the Modern Language Association. The current editors are Priscilla Wald and Matthew A. Taylor. The first volume of this journal was published in March 1929. Founders include Fred Lewis Pattee, among others.

Coverage includes the contributions and works of American authors. Temporal coverage is from the colonial period until present day. Publishing formats also include book review, and relevant announcements (conferences, grants, and publishing opportunities). A citations index is also part of this journal. The index is for future issues and reprints, collections, anthologies, and professional books.

== Abstracting and indexing ==
This journal is Indexed/abstracted in the following databases:

Thomson Reuters:

Arts & Humanities Citation Index
Current Contents / Arts & Humanities

Academic Abstracts Fulltext Elite & Ultra
Academic Research Library,
Academic Search Elite & Premier
America: History and Life
Book Review Digest
Discovery
Expanded Academic ASAP

Student Resource Center College

General Reference Center Gold & International
Historical Abstracts
Humanities and Social Sciences Index Retrospective, 1907–1984,

Humanities Abstracts,
Humanities Full Text,
Humanities Index,
Humanities Index Retrospective, 1907–1984,
Humanities International Complete,
Humanities International Index,
Social Sciences Index Retrospective, 1907–1984

International Bibliography of Periodical Literature (IBZ),
Literary Reference Center,
Literature Online
Magazines for Libraries
MasterFILE Elite & Premier & Select
MLA Bibliography,
OmniFile Full Text - Mega Edition
Professional Development Collection (EBSCO)
Research Library
