= West Shore Home =

American home improvement company

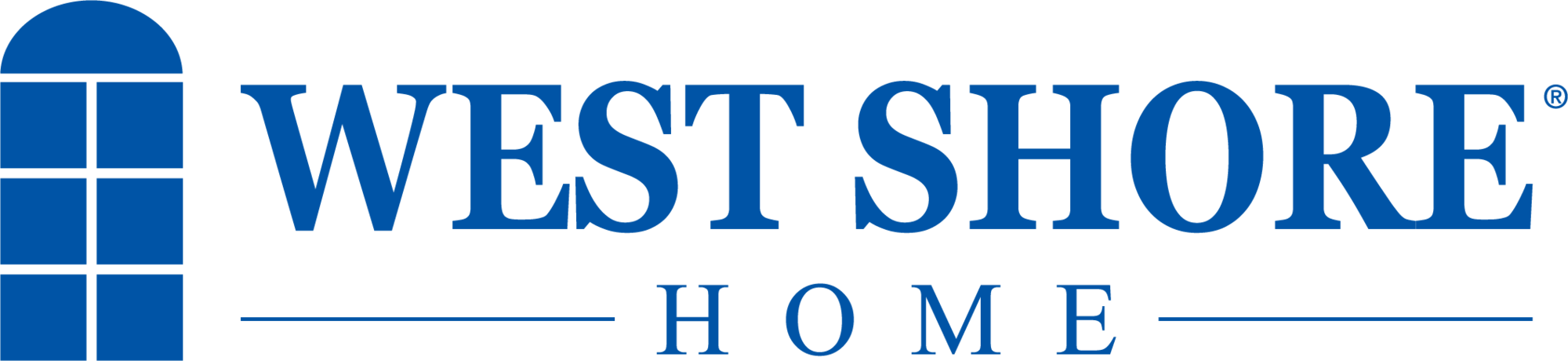
- Type: Private
- Industry: Home Remodeling
- Founded: 2006
- Founder: B.J. Werzyn
- Headquarters: Mechanicsburg, Pennsylvania, United States
- Area served: United States
- Key people: B.J. Werzyn (CEO)
- Revenue: 1 Billion USD (2025)
- Number of employees: 3,000+
- Website: westshorehome.com

West Shore Home is an American home remodeling company headquartered in Mechanicsburg, Pennsylvania.

== History ==
West Shore Home was founded in 2006 by B.J. Werzyn, a 1999 graduate of Pennsylvania State University. The company began as a window and door replacement business operating from a single office in central Pennsylvania.

Originally, the company was named West Shore Window & Door Inc., but it was later rebranded as West Shore Home. In 2016, West Shore Home opened its first expansion location in Pittsburgh, Pennsylvania. In 2018, the company expanded outside Pennsylvania with the opening of a branch in Tampa, Florida.

In June 2021, the company opened its first corporate headquarters, a 56,000-square-foot facility in Mechanicsburg. The following year, in July 2022, the company opened a second headquarters location at 4600 Westport Drive in Mechanicsburg.

In July 2022, West Shore Home acquired Design Center, Inc., a company based in St. Paul, Minnesota, which provides mobile application development, virtual reality solutions, and custom software. In June 2023, the company opened a western regional headquarters in Irving, Texas, in the Las Colinas district.

West Shore Home opened its Western Headquarters in Irving, Texas, in 2023. By that year, the company had grown to approximately 3,000 employees and projected revenue of around $900 million. As of 2025, West Shore Home operates in over 40 markets across 21 states with annual revenue of around 1 billion USD.

In March 2025, West Shore Home and the Werzyn family announced a naming rights agreement with Pennsylvania State University for the football field at Beaver Stadium. According to the agreement, West Shore Home will pay $50 million over 15 years for the naming rights. The field was renamed "West Shore Home Field at Beaver Stadium" beginning with the 2025 season through 2039.

West Shore Home specializes in bathroom renovations, window replacements, door installations, and flooring services and has completed over 300,000 home renovation projects since its founding.

=== Acquisitions ===
In November 2018, West Shore Home acquired Brytons Home Improvement, its first acquisition. In 2019, the company acquired America's Window LLC and Fairbanks Construction. It acquired Quality Advantage Home Products and New Bath Alabama in 2020. In 2021, West Shore Home acquired Herl's Bath & Home Solutions, Hullco Inc., and Skyline Windows. The company acquired Stormfitters in 2022.

== Community involvement ==
In 2025, West Shore Home partnered with University of Alabama softball players to support the Toys for Tots campaign, contributing to regional holiday charity efforts. The company also has a veteran-support program, West Shore for Warriors, which focuses on improving accessibility and safety in the homes of disabled and elderly veterans.

In 2025, West Shore Home ran a school-supply donation drive through its Greenville branch, collecting over 9,000 items for a local elementary school to support students and families ahead of the new school year.

== See also ==
- West Shore Home Field at Beaver Stadium
