= Fred Lewis Pattee =

American academic (1863–1950)

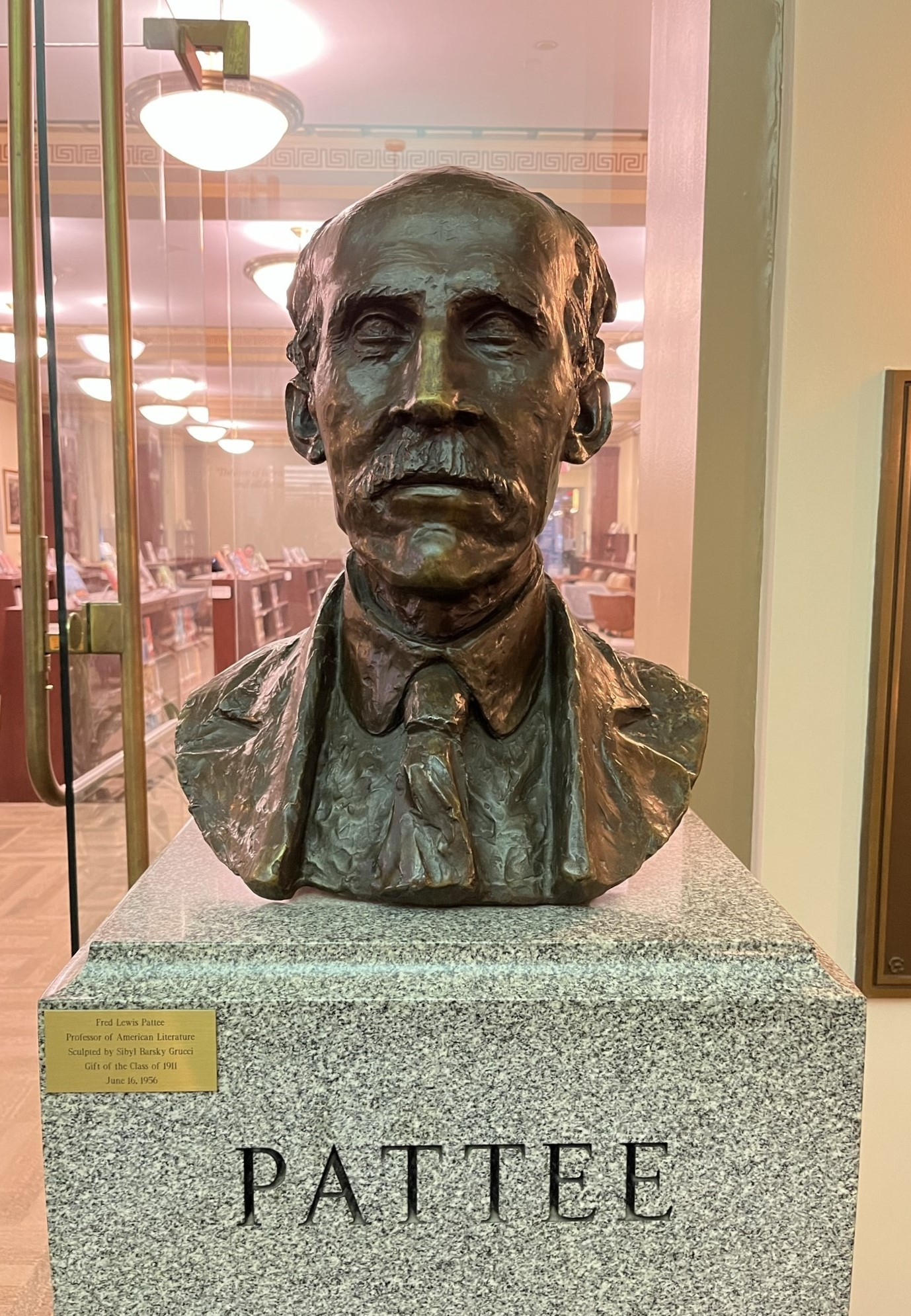
- Bust of Pattee
- Born: 22 March 1863; Bristol, New Hampshire, U.S.
- Died: May 6, 1950 (aged 87); Winter Park, Florida, U.S.
- Education: Dartmouth College (AB, AM)
- Occupations: Author; professor
- Known for: Penn State Alma Mater
- Spouses: Anna Lura Plumer; Grace Gorrell Garee
- Children: 1

Fred Lewis Pattee (March 22, 1863 – May 6, 1950) was an American author and scholar of American literature. As a professor of American literature at the Pennsylvania State University, Pattee wrote the lyrics of the Penn State Alma Mater. Pattee is sometimes labeled the "first Professor of American Literature", a position he held at Penn State from 1895 until 1928.

== Biography ==
Fred Lewis Pattee was born on March 22, 1863, in Bristol, New Hampshire, to farmer Lewis Franklin Pattee and Mary Philbrick Pattee (née Ingalls). After attending public schools in Bristol and South Alexandria, New Hampshire, in 1881 he entered New Hampton School and completed the college preparatory course in 1884. Pattee enrolled at Dartmouth College, earning a Bachelor of Arts degree in 1888 and a Master of Arts degree in 1891. Despite an interest in becoming a journalist, Pattee entered the teaching profession, first at a New Jersey grammar school. He worked as a school administrator and journalist until becoming an interim faculty member at the Pennsylvania State College's English Department as a substitute for the department's head and sole professor in 1894. He earned a full professorship the following year.

While a professor at the Pennsylvania State College (now Pennsylvania State University), Pattee wrote the lyrics to what is now the Penn State Alma Mater in April 1901 and had them published. James A. Beaver, former Pennsylvania governor and then-president of the Board of Trustees declared the tune would be Penn State College's official song after it was sung at an alumni dinner in 1901. With Penn State president George W. Atherton's consent, a four-verse version of Pattee's originally six-verse lyrics were adopted as the Penn State Alma Mater.

As an American literary historian, Pattee's earliest predecessor was John Neal, whose essays in Blackwood's Magazine he collected and published in 1937 in their first bound edition, American Writers: A Series of Papers Contributed to Blackwood's Magazine (1824–1825). He acknowledged Neal's work as "the first attempt anywhere at a history of American literature".

In his later career, Pattee served as a visiting professor at his alma mater, Dartmouth College (1905), as well as the University of Illinois, Bread Loaf Summer School and Columbia University. In 1929, he co-founded the American Literature journal. Following his retirement from his post as Penn State's professor of American literature, Pattee joined the faculty of Rollins College in Florida. He would remain there until his death at age 87 in Winter Park, Florida, on May 6, 1950.

Pattee was married twice, to Anna Lura Plumer and Grace Gorrell Garee, and had one daughter—Sarah Lewis Pattee—from his first marriage.

== Legacy ==
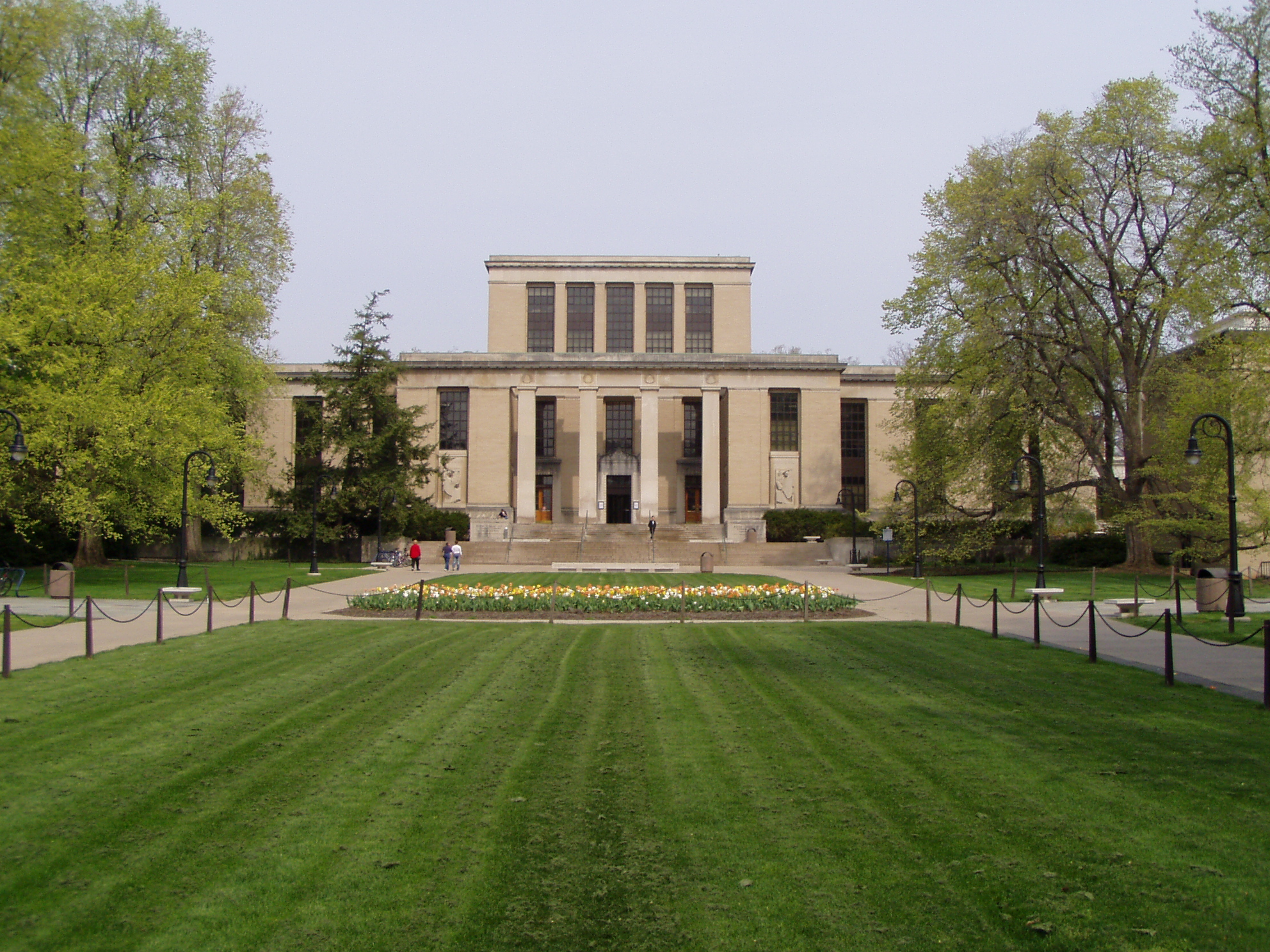
The Pattee Library at Penn State, from the Pattee Mall.

A library was constructed on Penn State's flagship University Park campus from 1937 to 1940, known as Pattee Library, that now forms the west wing of the Pattee and Paterno Libraries, the center of Penn State's library system.

== See also ==
- Penn State Alma Mater
- Pennsylvania State University Libraries
