= The Nittany Lion =

Song

"The Nittany Lion" is a traditional fight song played by the Penn State Blue Band at football games and other sporting events. During the pre-game show of home football games at Beaver Stadium, it is part of the traditional Lion Fanfare and Downfield. While it is not the official fight song of Penn State, it is one of the songs most widely associated with the university, and is also incorrectly referred to as "Hail to the Lion" (or Lions). On Fridays and Saturdays, the clock tower in Penn State's Old Main plays a line of the chorus music at the fifteen-minute mark of each hour, and adds a line every 15 minutes until the whole chorus is played on the completion of the hour.

== Lyrics ==
The original lyrics were written by Penn State alumnus James Leyden between 1922 and 1924.

Today, only the first verse and chorus are commonly used:

Every college has a legend
Passed on from year to year
To which they pledge allegiance
And always cherish dear
But of all the honored idols
There's but one that stands the test
It's the stately Nittany Lion
The symbol of our best

[Chorus] Hail to the Lion
Loyal and true
Hail, Alma Mater
With your White and Blue
Penn State forever
Molder of men (and women)
Fight for her honor (fight!)
And victory again

== History ==
"The Nittany Lion" was written by Penn State graduate and former Glee Club member James Leyden between 1922 and 1924. Professor Hummel Fishburn and Blue Band Bandmaster Tommy Thompson assisted Leyden in finishing the song, which was premiered at a pep rally the night before a football game to instant popularity.

The second verse was used prior to 1993, when Penn State was an IA Independent school. When it joined the Big Ten athletically in 1993, the third verse, The Big Ten verse, was written by a student, Renee Borusky, who won a University-wide contest. Currently the Blue Band performs the first and third verse of The Nittany Lion.

== See also ==
- Penn State Alma Mater, official alma mater of Pennsylvania State University
- Fight On, State, official fight song of Pennsylvania State University
