= O. Richard Bundy =

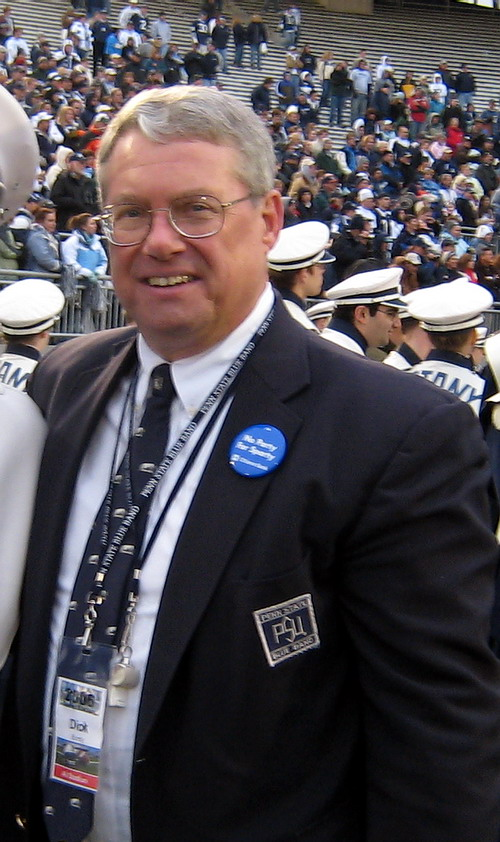
- Born: June 14, 1948 (age 78)
- Occupation: Academic
- Spouse: Chris
- Children: 4
- Awards: Sudler Trophy

Academic work
- Discipline: Music
- Institutions: The Pennsylvania State University

Orrin Richard Bundy (born June 19, 1948) is a retired American music conductor and professor.

Bundy was the director of the Penn State Athletic Bands, one of which is the Penn State Blue Band. He originally joined the University Park faculty of The Pennsylvania State University in 1982 as a graduate assistant, then was appointed assistant director of the Blue Band in 1988, before being appointed director in 1996. In addition to his role as director, he taught courses in conducting, marching band techniques, instrumental music education, and band literature. He retired as director in 2015, after 27 years on the faculty.

Bundy's tenure was unique as the only Blue Band director to have also been a member of the marching Blue Band as an undergraduate: before returning as a graduate student, Bundy had played in the Blue Band from 1966 to 1970, during his four years as a college undergraduate. Upon graduation in 1970, Bundy enlisted in the United States Army and served as a trombonist with the United States Continental Army Band. After completing his tour of duty with the military, Bundy became band director and instrumental music instructor in 1976 for the Iroquois School District, in Erie, Pennsylvania. Bundy then went on to receive his master's degree from the University of Michigan before returning to Penn State for his doctoral degree.

As a guest conductor and adjudicator, Bundy has led ensembles and presented clinics across the United States and Canada. He is a member of the College Band Directors National Association (CBDNA), the Music Educators National Conference, Pennsylvania Music Educators Association, Phi Beta Mu, and Phi Mu Alpha Sinfonia. He was the past president of the Eastern Division of CBDNA and the Nu chapter of Phi Beta Mu. From 2005 to 2007, Bundy partnered with fellow Penn State faculty member and sports enthusiast Jon Nese on the radio program "Let's Talk Penn State." Bundy received Penn State's College of Arts & Architecture Alumni Achievement Award in 2000.

Bundy oversaw a number of milestones in the history of the Blue Band, such as the emergence of the Alumni Blue Band Association (ABBA), which has grown to become the largest Alumni Affiliate Group (AAG) in the Penn State Alumni Association, an expansion in the size of the band, the construction of the Blue Band Building, and the receipt of the Sudler Trophy in 2005. The Blue Band Building was renamed in his honor upon his retirement in 2015.

Bundy's wife, Chris, is an employee of Penn State, and they have four children.
