= Wesley Howard =

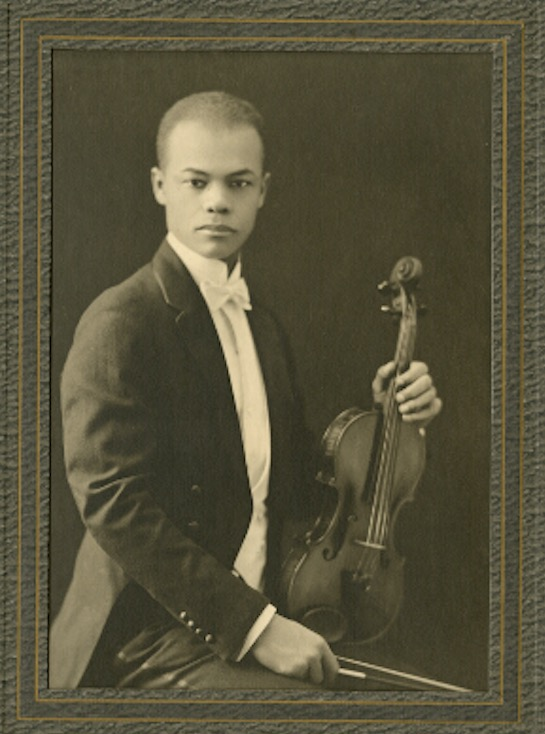
- Studio portrait of Wesley Howard from 1921
- Born: February 1, 1892; Springfield, Ohio, US
- Died: November 1962 (aged 70); Pierpont Township, Ohio, US
- Occupations: Professor, classical musician

Wesley Isaac Howard (February 1, 1892 – November 1962) was a violinist and professor in charge of the violin and ensemble departments at the Howard University Conservatory of Music from 1921 to 1927.

Howard attended the New England Conservatory of Music, graduating in 1916. He was an assistant band leader in the 809th Pioneer Infantry in World War One. He returned to study abroad in 1921 and received a certificate of commendation from Maurice Hayot at École Normale de Musique de Paris.

He played for five years in two different white symphony orchestras and managed the orchestra at the Hampton Institute. He was awarded a Wanamaker Music Contest prize in 1927 and played with Roland Hayes for several seasons.

== Personal life ==
Howard was born in Springfield, Ohio to Preston Howard and Mary Thomas. He moved to Richmond, Indiana when he was six years old. He married Harriet Nelson in 1920.

He was found dead at his home in Pierpont Township, Ashtabula County, Ohio on November 29, 1962. He had last been seen alive on November 22.
