= Penn State Alma Mater =

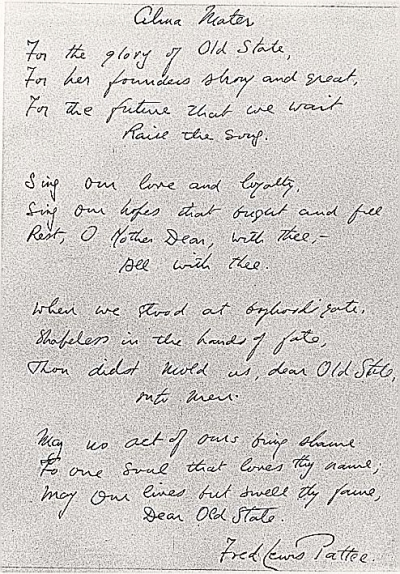
- The original Penn State Alma Mater, handwritten and published by Fred Lewis Pattee in April 1901.

Song
- Published: 1901
- Genre: Alma mater
- Songwriter(s): Fred Lewis Pattee

The "Penn State Alma Mater" is the official alma mater of The Pennsylvania State University. The song was accepted by the university in 1901.

== History ==
Because Penn State lacked an alma mater, Fred Lewis Pattee, Professor of American Literature, wrote lyrics and published them freelance in April 1901. Pattee bemoaned the fact that Penn State had no college song which would nourish college spirit and loyalty as other schools had. He encouraged suggestions from other writers, though decided upon lyrics that could be sung to the hymn "Lead Me On," (page 316 of the College Hymnal) by Cauviere, which was sung by graduating classes at commencement. Pattee felt it was a good match, as it was well-suited for male voices.

Pattee's song premiered at an alumni dinner during Commencement Week in June 1901. Governor James Beaver, President of the Board of Trustees, called it "the official song of Penn State", and University President George Atherton accepted it as the official alma mater.

Pattee's original 1901 lyrics contained six verses, but the last two were later dropped. The original lyrics also contained the phrases "When we stood at boyhood's gate" and "Thou didst mold us ... into men", as the university was primarily male-oriented at the beginning of the 20th century, although some concern had been expressed at the time because Penn State had been coed since 1871. In Pattee's posthumously-published autobiography, however, he recommended changing the phrasing into "childhood" and a repeat of "dear old State", as the university was coeducational. This change occurred in 1975, declared as "International Women's Year" by the United Nations.

The Penn State Glee Club first performed the alma mater under the direction of Charles M. H. Atherton, who began as director in 1893 with support from his father, Penn State President George Atherton. The song was often sung with a degree of humorous irreverence, as Glee Club programs at the time were affable affairs. The second half of a performance was often comedic, including skits and sketch comedy, where a clever jab at a professor could lead to a rousing chorus of “Hail to Old State” or the “Alma Mater.”

During the mid-1970's, it became popular at Penn State football games for students and alumni to replace the alma mater's lyrics with, "We don't know the god-damn words". Participating members were often criticized by alumni for their failure to acknowledge that the university placed the lyrics on the stadium's large screen while the band was playing the song. The practice died in the early 1990s as school pride led a growing majority of students to shout, "Sing it proud!", when their classmates began the alternate lyrics.

== Composition ==
The Alma Mater is set in Concert F Major.

== Lyrics ==
For the glory of old State,
For her founders strong and great,
For the future that we wait,
Raise the song, raise the song.

Sing our love and loyalty,
Sing our hopes that bright and free
Rest, O mother dear, with thee,
All with thee, all with thee.

When we stood at childhood's gate,
Shapeless in the hands of fate,
Thou didst mold us, dear old State,
Dear old State, dear old State.

May no act of ours bring shame,
To one heart that loves thy name.
May our lives but swell thy fame,
Dear old State, dear old State.

(verses 5 and 6 are rarely performed)

Soon we know a guiding hand
Will disperse our little band,
Yet we'll ever loyal stand
State to thee, State to thee

Then Rah! Rah! for dear old State,
For our love can ne'er abate!
Ring the song with joy elate
Loud and long, loud and long.

== See also ==
- Fight On, State, official fight song of The Pennsylvania State University
- The Nittany Lion, traditional fight song of The Pennsylvania State University played by the Blue Band during football games
