= Penn State Blue Band =

Marching band of Pennsylvania State University

- School: The Pennsylvania State University
- Location: University Park, Pennsylvania
- Conference: Big Ten
- Founded: 1899
- Director: Gregory Drane
- Assistant Directors: Robert Hickey, Michquelena Ferguson
- Members: 320+
- Fight song: "Fight On, State" and "The Nittany Lion"

Uniform
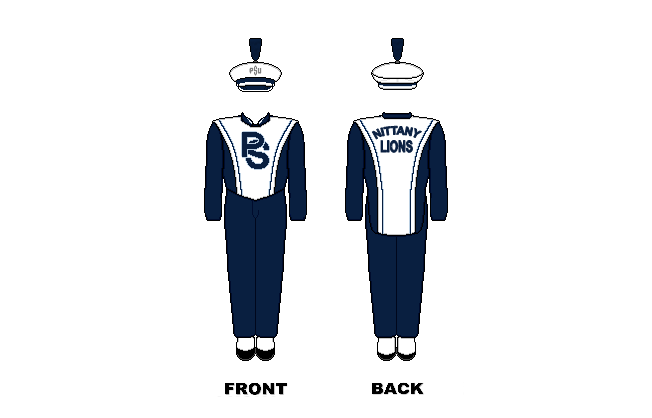
- Website: https://blueband.psu.edu/

The Pennsylvania State University Marching Blue Band, known generally as the Penn State Blue Band or simply the Blue Band, is the marching band of Pennsylvania State University. Founded in 1899, it is the largest recognized student organization at the University Park campus of Penn State, with over 300 active student members. The primary function of the band is to support the Penn State Nittany Lions football team, performing for all home football games at Beaver Stadium.

== Background ==
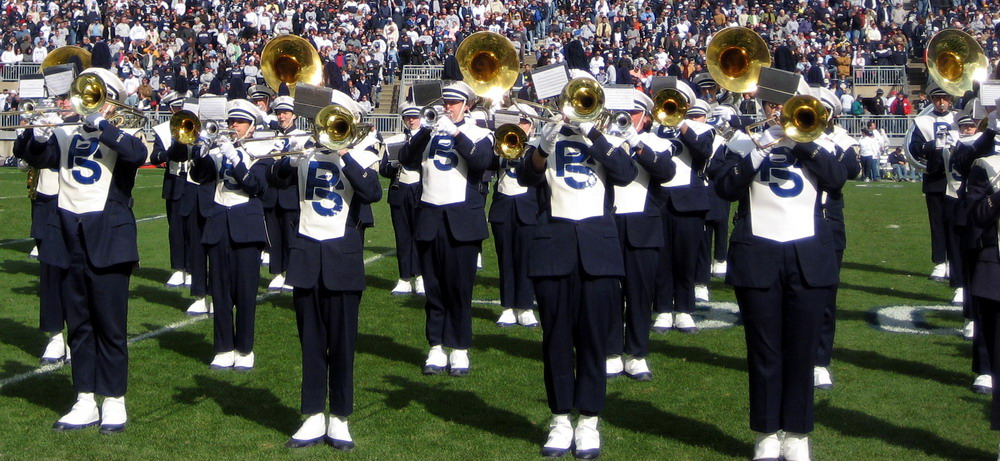
The Blue Band during a halftime performance in Beaver Stadium.

The Blue Band is open to all students at the Penn State University Park Campus by competitive audition. The Blue Band accepts 290-315 student members annually; returnees must re-audition. All students who participate in the Blue Band are enrolled in a one-credit class and must remain in good standing with the university in order to maintain their eligibility with the band.

The Blue Band consists of instrumentalists, Blue Band Silks (color guard), Touch of Blue (majorettes), a drum major, a Blue Sapphire (featured baton twirler), uniform managers, and student operations assistants.

The Blue Band performs throughout the school year; in addition to home football games, the entire band typically travels to one or two away games per season, and there is also a small pep band that travels to other select away games.

The band also takes part in other performances, including the "Be a Part from the Start" event at the beginning of the academic year to help welcome the incoming class of freshmen. Outside of the Blue Band's obligations as a pep band, the band occasionally performs in a concert known as "Bandorama", consisting of a reprisal of the year's halftime music and fight songs.

Separate from the Blue Band is the Pride of the Lions Pep Band, an ensemble which performs at men's basketball, women's basketball, women's volleyball, and other various sporting events on campus. Audition is not required for this ensemble.

== History ==
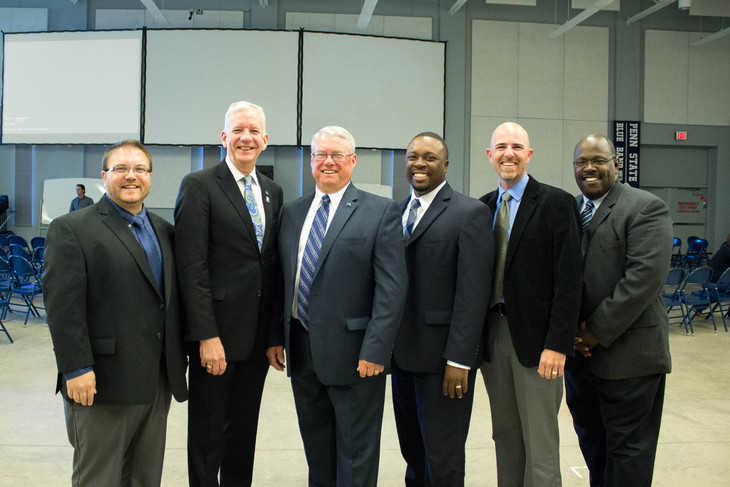
Penn State band directors (2015)

The Blue Band traces its history to 1899 with the formation of a six-member drum and bugle corps initiated by student George H. Deike. A donation from steel magnate and Penn State College Board of Trustees member Andrew Carnegie made possible the formation of a brass band in the summer of 1901. By 1913, the organization was known as the College Band, and the first permanent director of bands, Wilfred O. "Tommy" Thompson, was appointed in 1914.

In 1923, blue uniforms were purchased towards replacement of the old brown military-style uniforms in use at the time. Blue uniforms were issued on the basis of ability and rank.

The Blue Band made its film debut in the 1977 made-for-TV movie Something for Joey. Appearing again in the 1993 feature film Rudy, they played "The Nittany Lion" in the movie.

In 2005, the Penn State Blue Band was honored with the Sudler Trophy.

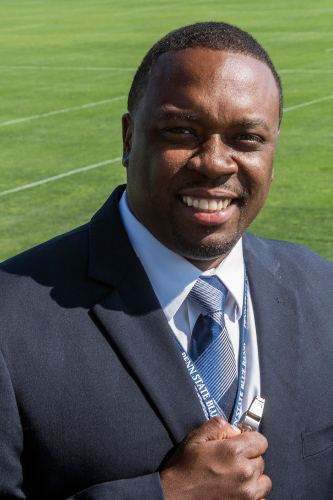
Dr. Gregory Drane, current director of athletic bands at Penn State

During succeeding eras in which Hummel (Hum) Fishburn (1939–1947), James W. Dunlop (1947–1975), Ned C. Deihl (1975–1996), O. Richard Bundy (1996–2015) served as directors, the name Penn State Blue Band was kept even though all members were uniformed in blue. Since 2015, the director of the Blue Band has been Gregory Drane.

== Performances ==
The Blue Band has appeared at 33 bowl games, including multiple appearances in the Orange, Cotton, Sugar, Fiesta, Gator, Rose, and Citrus Bowls. The band has also performed at the Outback, Blockbuster, Holiday, Pinstripe, and Peach Bowls, and for the Buffalo Bills on Monday Night Football.

The Blue Band marched in the Bicentennial Constitution Celebration Parade held in Philadelphia in 1987, and made its first appearance in the Tournament of Roses Parade in Pasadena on January 2, 1995, having made several additional appearances since.

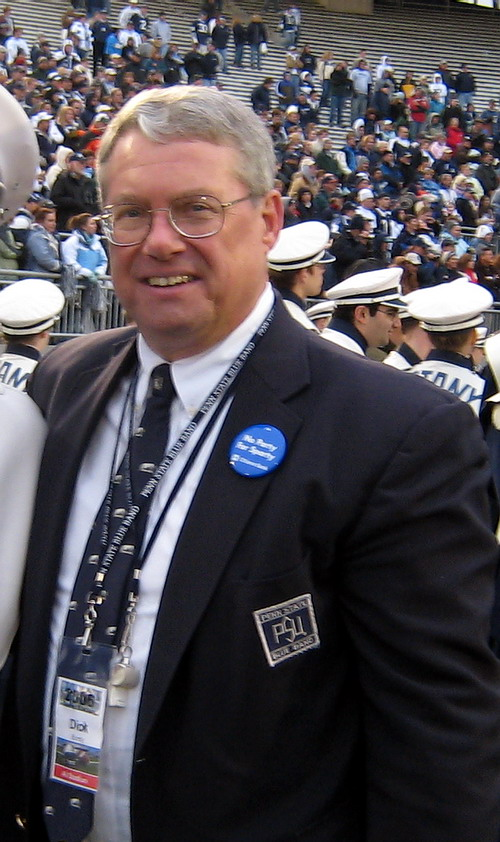
Dr. O. Richard Bundy, director of athletic bands emeritus at Penn State

== Organization ==
=== Director ===
Since July 2015, the band has been led by its sixth director, Dr. Gregory Drane. Dr. Drane previously served as Assistant Director of the Blue Band from 2005 until his appointment as director, and has been part of the Blue Band staff since 2002, when he started as a graduate assistant.

=== Director emeritus ===
From 1996 to 2015, the Blue Band was under the direction of O. Richard Bundy. Bundy received his undergraduate degree in music education from Penn State. After receiving a master's degree from the University of Michigan, he returned to Penn State for his doctoral degree (serving as assistant director under Ned C. Deihl from 1983 to 1996). On October 11, 2015, the Blue Band's practice facility was dedicated in Bundy's honor and renamed to the O. Richard Bundy Blue Band Building.

=== Drum major ===
The Penn State Blue Band has one drum major who is chosen in the spring prior to each band camp. The drum major leads the band through warm-ups and fundamentals, as well as instructing the band during rehearsals.

In 2025, for the first time in the Blue Band’s 126-year history, Ellie Sheehan was selected as the band’s first female drum major. This marked a major milestone, establishing a new precedent for the future of the band.

The 2026 drum major is Justin Senzer.

=== Feature Twirler ===
The Blue Band's feature twirler is called the "Blue Sapphire." The 2026 Blue Sapphire is Delaney Higgins.

=== Officers ===
The Blue Band is also maintained in large part by student officers who are elected by the band at the end of the season for the next season.
