= Fight On, State =

Fight song of Pennsylvania State University

"Fight On, State" is the official fight song of The Pennsylvania State University. It is most widely known for being played by the Penn State Blue Band after scores at football games, and during the band's pregame show. It is written specifically to be played after a touchdown, as it slows down quickly toward the end of the song, then stops. It then resumes after the team kicks an extra point and is played again at regular speed.

"New Fight On, State", known simply as "NFOS", is a shortened version of the song played without the slowdown and pause. It is the second fight song performed in the Penn State Blue Band's pregame show. Written in 1968, "NFOS" takes the band out of a four-step interval block into a PSU formation on the field. "NFOS" is performed two different ways during the pregame show. During the transfer to the PSU formation, the band plays "NFOS short", which starts about halfway through the piece and continues to the end. After the Floating Lions drill, the band plays "NFOS long", which is simply the entire piece.

== Lyrics ==
Fight on State (GO!)
Fight on State (GO!)
Strike your gait and win, (LET'S GO STATE!)
Victory we predict for thee
We're ever true to you, dear old White and Blue.

Onward State, (GO!)
Onward State, (GO!)
Roar, Lions, roar: (LET'S GO STATE!)
We'll hit that line, roll up the score,
Fight on to victory ever more,
Fight on, on, on, on, on, Fight on, on, Penn State! (S-T-A-T-E GO! STATE!)

== History ==
"Fight on, State" was written by Penn State graduate Joseph Sanders. While Sanders graduated in 1915, it is not known when the song was written. In 1933, Sanders shared the song with the head of the music department, Dr. Richard Grant. Afterwards, Grant along with other staff in the music department shared the song to the student body at a freshman meeting.

== See also ==
- Penn State Alma Mater, official alma mater of The Pennsylvania State University
- The Nittany Lion, traditional fight song of The Pennsylvania State University played by the Blue Band during football games
