= Kitchel =

Kitchel is a surname. Notable people with the surname include:

- Cornelius P. Kitchel (1875–1947), former mayor of Englewood, New Jersey
- Denison Kitchel (1908–2002), campaign manager of Barry M. Goldwater
- Harvey Denison Kitchel (1812–1895), former president of Middlebury College
- Jane Kitchel (born 1945), member of the Vermont Senate
- Ted Kitchel (born 1959), basketball player

== See also ==
- Kitchel, Indiana, an unincorporated community in Union County
- Kitchell, surname
