= Joseph Warner =

Joseph Warner may refer to:

- Joseph E. Warner (Massachusetts politician) (1884–1958), American politician and judge in Massachusetts
- Joseph Little Warner (1803-1865), Middlebury college hall
- Joseph E. Warner (Michigan politician) (1870–1956), member of the Michigan House of Representatives
- Joseph Warner (priest), Irish Anglican priest
- Joseph Warner (surgeon) (1717–1801), British surgeon
