= C.V. Starr-Middlebury Schools Abroad =

The Middlebury C.V. Starr Schools Abroad, operated by Middlebury College in 17 countries across 5 continents, offer overseas academic programs for undergraduates from various U.S. institutions, as well as graduate-level programs for students from the Middlebury College Language Schools and the Middlebury Institute of International Studies at Monterey. The first School was the School in Paris, opened in 1949. The Middlebury C.V. Starr Schools have been endowed by the C.V. Starr Foundation.

== Academic program ==
Programs vary in nature and in size. All instruction is in the host country language and conforms to that country's educational approach. Students may study for one or two semesters and can combine an internship with academic study. At many of the Schools, students can opt to directly enroll at a local university.

The Middlebury C.V. Starr Schools have an immersion-based approach to language and cultural acquisition. All students must sign Middlebury's "Language Pledge," agreeing to exclusively use their target language for the duration of the program.

== Locations ==
There are 32 Middlebury C.V. Starr Schools Abroad, located in 16 countries across 5 continents:

- School in Argentina: Buenos Aires
- School in Brazil: Florianópolis and Niterói
- School in Cameroon: Yaoundé
- School in Chile: Concepción, Santiago, Temuco, Valdivia, Valparaíso, Villarrica, and Viña del Mar
- School in France: Paris, Poitiers, and Bordeaux
- School in Germany: Berlin, Potsdam and Mainz
- School in Greater China: Beijing and Kaohsiung, Taiwan
- School in Italy: Florence
- School in Japan: Tokyo
- School in Jordan: Amman
- School in Kazakhstan: Astana
- School in Morocco: Rabat
- School in Puerto Rico: Mayagüez and San Juan
- School in Spain: Cordoba, Logroño, and Madrid
- School in Uruguay: Montevideo
- School in United Kingdom: Oxford

There was also a school in Alexandria, Egypt until it closed after being evacuated during the 2011 revolution. The school in Egypt was replaced with a school in Rabat, Morocco, which opened in 2016.

== Rankings ==
The 2011 Princeton Review ranked Middlebury's study abroad programs as the 6th most popular in the United States.

== See also ==
- Language school
