= Kitchell =

Kitchell is a surname. Notable people with the surname include:

- Aaron Kitchell (1744–1820), U.S. Representative and Senator
- Abdul Kitchell (born 1916), Hong Kong international lawn bowler
- Alma Kitchell (1893–1996), American concert singer
- Hudson Mindell Kitchell (1862–1944), American artist
- Iva Kitchell (1908–1983), concert dancer
- Sonya Kitchell (born 1989), American jazz singer-songwriter
- Webster Kitchell (1931–2009), theologian
- Wickliffe Kitchell (1789–1869), American politician and lawyer

== See also ==
- Ketchell, surname
- Kitchel, surname
- Kitchell Park, Pana, Illinois
