= Paul Moody =

Paul Moody may refer to:

- Paul Moody (footballer) (born 1967), English football player
- Paul Moody (inventor) (1779–1831), American inventor
- Paul Dwight Moody (1879–1947), Presbyterian clergyman
