= Timothy Light =

American sinologist (1938–2025)

Timothy C. Light (Chinese: 黎天睦; pinyin: Lí Tíanmù; November 5, 1938 – December 14, 2025) was an American sinologist. He was the fourteenth president of Middlebury College, from 1990 to 1991.

A native of Kalamazoo, Michigan, Light was a scholar in East Asian languages and literature. He served as provost of Kalamazoo College prior to his time at Middlebury, and later became a professor of religion and provost at Western Michigan University.

== Professional career ==
Light's academic career began at the Chinese University of Hong Kong, where he held several teaching and administrative positions from 1960 to 1971. He was a faculty member and director of the East Asia Study Center at the University of Arizona between 1974 and 1980.

Light was a professor and chairperson of the Department of East Asian Languages and Literature at Ohio State University from 1980 to 1986, when he was named provost and professor of linguistics and Asian studies at Kalamazoo College. He went on to serve as acting president at Kalamazoo College in 1989–90, and then served for a year as president of Middlebury College before coming to Western Michigan University to serve as provost. He stepped down from that post in 2000 to pursue his academic work.

Before his death, Light was a Professor Emeritus of Chinese Religion at Western Michigan University.

== Political involvement ==
Light contributed funds to Democratic candidates and causes including $75,000 to Michigan State Representative Robert Jones' PAC.

== Death ==
Light died on December 14, 2025, at the age of 87.

== See also ==
- Light (surname)

Preceded by Olin Clyde Robison	President of Middlebury College; 1990–1991	Succeeded by John Malcolm McCardell, Jr.
