= Jeremiah Atwater =

American educator and minister (1773–1858)

3rd President of Dickinson College
- In office 1809–1815
- Preceded by: Robert Davidson (acting)
- Succeeded by: John McKnight

1st President of Middlebury College
- In office 1800–1809
- Preceded by: Office established
- Succeeded by: Henry Davis

Personal details
- Born: December 27, 1773 New Haven, Connecticut Colony, British America
- Died: July 29, 1858 (aged 84) New Haven, Connecticut, U.S.
- Education: Yale University
- Occupation: Educator; minister; administrator

Jeremiah Atwater (December 27, 1773 – July 29, 1858) was notable as an educator, minister, and college president.

== Career ==
Atwater became principal of the Addison County Grammar School in 1799 and, a year later, when the school became Middlebury College, assumed the role of its first president. In 1809, Atwater left Middlebury to become the third president of Dickinson College in Pennsylvania.

He remained in that position until 1815, when he returned to New Haven, Connecticut, his birthplace and home of his alma mater, Yale University. Atwater Commons, one of five residential commons at Middlebury, is named for him. Dickinson College also has an Atwater Hall named for him. Atwater was elected a member of the American Antiquarian Society in 1815.

Preceded by -	1st President of Middlebury College; 1800–1809	Succeeded by Henry Davis
