= Henry Davis (cleric) =

American cleric (1771–1852)

2nd President of Middlebury College
- In office 1809–1818
- Preceded by: Jeremiah Atwater
- Succeeded by: Joshua Bates

President of Hamilton College
- In office 1817–1833

Personal details
- Born: September 15, 1771 East Hampton, Province of New York, British America
- Died: March 9, 1852 (aged 80) Clinton, New York, U.S.
- Occupation: Cleric

Henry Davis (September 15, 1771 – March 9, 1852) was a Christian cleric.

== Early life ==
Davis was born in East Hampton, New York, on September 15, 1771.

== Career ==
He was the second president of Middlebury College in Vermont, serving from 1809 to 1818. He later became president of Hamilton College, where he served from 1817 to 1833.

== Death ==
He died in Clinton, New York, on March 9, 1852.

== Publication ==
- Davis, Henry (1833). A narrative of the embarrassments and decline of Hamilton College.

Preceded by Jeremiah Atwater	President of Middlebury College; 1809–1818	Succeeded by Joshua Bates
