= Denison Kitchel =

Arizona lawyer and politician (1908–2002)

Personal details
- Born: March 1, 1908 Bronxville, New York, U.S.
- Died: October 10, 2002 (aged 94) Phoenix, Arizona, U.S.
- Party: Republican
- Spouse: Naomi Douglas (1941–2002)
- Children: 2
- Education: Yale University (BA); Harvard University (JD)

Military service
- Allegiance: United States
- Branch/service: United States Army
- Rank: Lieutenant Colonel
- Unit: United States Army Air Forces
- Battles/wars: World War II

Denison Kitchel (March 1, 1908 – October 10, 2002) was a lawyer from Phoenix, Arizona, who was an advisor to and the campaign manager of Republican Barry M. Goldwater in the 1964 U.S. presidential campaign against the Democrat Lyndon B. Johnson.

== Background ==
Kitchel was born in Bronxville in suburban Westchester County north of New York City, New York. His great-grandfather, Harvey Denison Kitchel, a Congregationalist minister, was from 1866 to 1875 the president of Middlebury College in Middlebury, Vermont. Kitchel was the son of Connecticut native William Lloyd Kitchel (born 1869) and the former Grace Welch Wheeler (born 1872). His sister, Alice Lloyd Kitchel, was the namesake of his paternal grandmother. The older of his two paternal uncles, Cornelius P. Kitchel, was mayor of Englewood, New Jersey, from 1930 to 1933.

In 1930, Denison Kitchel graduated from Yale University in New Haven, Connecticut. In 1933 Kitchel completed Harvard Law School in Cambridge, Massachusetts, where he studied under Felix Frankfurter, who became an associate justice of the United States Supreme Court during the administration of U.S. President Franklin D. Roosevelt. After law school, Kitchel headed west to join the Phoenix firm of Ellinwood & Ross, which became Evans, Kitchel & Jenckes. Kitchel was considered an authority on constitutional, labor, and international law. He represented many clients in the metals industries. In 1953, the young attorney William H. Rehnquist, later appointed as the Chief Justice of the United States by President Ronald W. Reagan, joined Kitchel's firm.

In April 1941, Kitchel married the former Naomi Douglas (1907–2004), an artist, a native of Santa Barbara, California, and the daughter of the mining and railroad executive Walter Douglas and his wife, the former Edith Margaret Bell. Naomi Kitchel, who attended Stanford University, was the first woman trustee of the Phoenix Art Museum, the founding chairman of Planned Parenthood in Phoenix, and a member of the National Federation of Republican Women. The couple had two sons, James Douglas Kitchel of Scottsdale and Harvey Denison Kitchel (namesake of his great-great-grandfather) of Jamul in San Diego County, California, and four grandchildren. He served for three years in England in the United States Army Air Corps during World War II and was discharged as a lieutenant colonel.

== 1964 campaign ==
The Kitchel-Goldwater friendship began in 1935, when Goldwater was a young department-store executive in Phoenix. In 1952, Kitchel managed the first of Goldwater's five successful, nonconsecutive campaigns for the United States Senate. He encouraged Goldwater's enthusiasm for the NATO and convinced the presidential candidate to support the unanimous 1954 United States Supreme Court decision Brown v. Board of Education, which led to the use of federal troops in 1957 in a test case to compel school desegregation in Little Rock, Arkansas.

Kitchel's judicious manner contrasted with Goldwater's early tendency to make controversial statements, to shoot from the hip. It was often said that Kitchel was the only man who could oppose Goldwater and still survive the conformity of the candidate's inner circle. Goldwater named Kitchel as campaign manager in January 1964. In doing so, he bypassed the key figures in the Draft Goldwater Committee, Goldwater's Senate campaign manager Stephen Shadegg, F. Clifton White and William A. Rusher. From the start, party leaders pressured Goldwater to replace Kitchel with a more experienced national figure. Some Republican financial contributors wanted Leonard W. Hall of New York, the chairman of the Republican National Committee from 1953 to 1957, for the top campaign position, but Goldwater stood behind is longtime friend.

Kitchel once said that he had an active distaste for campaigning, or "kissing babies", as he called such demands. However, Kitchel exerted leadership regarding issues, strategies, and drafting policy statements. Kitchel wrote Goldwater's Senate speech, which explained his then opposition to the Civil Rights Act of 1964, on constitutional and libertarian grounds. Goldwater believed that a business, engaged in interstate commerce, and otherwise open to the public, had a constitutional right and a liberty interest to turn someone way merely because his race, creed, color, or national origin. Then, Governor Mark O. Hatfield of Oregon, a moderate Republican and later a Senate colleague of Goldwater, who was the keynoter of the 1964 Republican National Convention in San Francisco, introduced Kitchel at a caucus of the Oregon delegation as

a man of little background in national politics.... Just as voters this year have been confounding the pollsters, this man has confounded the professional politicians.

Kitchel and several others in the Goldwater inner circle were hesitant to allow Reagan's well-remembered half-hour televised address on Goldwater's behalf. The program, "A Time for Choosing", aired on October 27, 1964, under auspices of F. Clifton White's "Citizens for Goldwater-Miller" organization.

After Goldwater's defeat, Shadegg published What Happened to Goldwater?: The Inside Story of the 1964 Republican Campaign, which revealed that Kitchel had been an early member of the John Birch Society. The New York Times reviewer recommended the book: "students of political organization and political philosophy will find many other minor fascinations in these pages, not least of which is the author's ambivalent attitude toward his hero."

== Legacy ==
From 1957 to 1963, Kitchel was general counsel for the Arizona Republican Party. In 1958, when Goldwater was first reelected to the Senate, Kitchel wrote the state party platform in which he defined his conservative philosophy in eight short paragraphs, one of which reads:

The preservation of freedom demands that governmental restraints be kept at a minimum and that both freedom of association and the right to work is protected.

Years later Kitchel revealed that he and Goldwater spent little time discussing a potential Goldwater Cabinet, considering the odds against the Republican nominee. "But there was a tentative agreement [that] the secretary of state was to be Richard Nixon, the secretary of the treasury [retired General Electric board chairman] Ralph Cordiner, and I was to be the attorney general."

Kitchel penned two books, Too Grave a Risk (1963), an examination of the International Court of Justice and the chasm in the justice systems of most member nations compared to the United States, and The Truth About the Panama Canal (1978), a study of the consequences of agreements between the United States and the Republic of Panama over the control of the Panama Canal waterway.

In 1994, the Kitchel house at 2912 E. Sherran Lane in Phoenix, which was constructed in 1942, was added to the National Register of Historic Places. Kitchel's papers from 1947 to 1980 can be accessed at Online Archive of California.
