= Paul Dwight Moody =

American religious figure (1879–1947)

- Born: April 11, 1879; Baltimore, Maryland, US
- Died: August 18, 1947 (aged 68); Shrewsbury, Vermont, US
- Education: Yale College
- Occupation: Educator
- Spouse: Charlotte May Hull (m. 1904)
- Children: 2
- Father: Dwight L. Moody

Paul Dwight Moody (April 11, 1879 – August 18, 1947) was an American educator. The son of Dwight L. Moody, he served at South Congregational Church in St. Johnsbury, Vermont from 1912 to 1917, and as the 10th president of Middlebury College from 1921 until 1943.

== Biography ==
Paul Dwight Moody was born in Baltimore on April 11, 1879. He graduated from Yale College in 1904. He married Charlotte May Hull in Southport, Connecticut on April 14 of that year, and they had two children.

During his tenure as president, two of Middlebury's most important institutions, the Bread Loaf School of English and the Middlebury College Language Schools saw growth in both quality and reputation. One of Moody's chief goals was the creation of a wholly separate women's college at Middlebury, as opposed to the semi-integrated system that had prevailed since women were first accepted in 1883. However, the Great Depression and World War II ultimately stymied his efforts at segregation by gender.

In addition to his position as President of Middlebury College, Moody was simultaneously Chairman of the committee that supervised the 1930 Survey that resulted in the Fourth Annual Report of the Eugenics Survey of Vermont, published under the auspices of the University of Vermont. Middlebury College at the time had "extensive involvement in the eugenics movement," and had been teaching eugenics since at least 1914. Moody was also Chairman (Note: "the Committee on the Human Factor (chaired by Middlebury College's Paul Moody") of the Committee for the Human Factor, which was "essentially a continuation of the Eugenics Survey." (Note: "the Committee for the Human Factor, essentially a continuation of the Eugenics Survey")

He died from a heart attack in Shrewsbury, Vermont on August 18, 1947.

== Bibliography ==
- Dann, Kevin (Winter 1991). "From Degeneration to Regeneration: The Eugenics Survey of Vermont, 1925-1936" (PDF). The Proceedings of the Vermont Historical Society. 59 (1). Barre. ISSN 0042-4161.

Preceded by John Martin Thomas	President of Middlebury College; 1921–1943	Succeeded by Samuel Somerville Stratton
