= Joshua Bates (educator) =

American educator

29th Chaplain of the United States House of Representatives
- In office February 4, 1840 – December 15, 1840
- Preceded by: Levi R. Reese
- Succeeded by: Thomas W. Braxton

President of Middlebury College
- In office 1818–1839
- Preceded by: Henry Davis
- Succeeded by: Benjamin Labaree

Personal details
- Born: March 20, 1776 Cohasset, Massachusetts, U.S.
- Died: January 14, 1854 (aged 77) Dudley, Massachusetts, U.S.

Joshua Bates (March 20, 1776 – January 14, 1854) was an American educator and clergyman. He was the third president of Middlebury College.

== Early life ==
Born in Cohasset, Massachusetts, he was the son of Zealous and Abigail Bates. Bates graduated from Harvard College in 1800. He became a special student in divinity at Phillips Academy, serving as well as an instructor at Phillips Andover Academy. He was licensed to preach by the Andover Association in 1802.

== Minister at First Church in Dedham ==
=== Call ===
From 1803 to 1818 he was minister at the First Church and Parish in Dedham, Massachusetts. As the years went on, the mental and physical condition of Bate's predecessor, Rev. Jason Haven, continued to decline. He was frequently so beset with fevers, migraines, and coughing spells that he could not get out of bed. The prospect of hiring an assistant or a replacement was brought up time and again at parish meetings, but without a decision ever being made. Finally, Bates was called to serve as associate pastor in April 1802. Fisher Ames served on the search committee, helping to explain why a Federalist minister was called to serve a congregation that was Democratic Republican by a ratio of 3 to 1.

Three months later, Haven died. On December 30, 1802, the parish met and debated whether or not Bates should be afforded the traditional lifetime contract. Nathaniel Ames, noting how unpopular Haven had become over the years, advocated for a trial period first. Fisher Ames made an eloquent speech of support and this was enough to issue a call. As a result, several members, including Nathaniel, left the church and became Episcopalians.

=== Ministry ===
Bates was ordained on March 16, 1803 "before a very crowded, but a remarkably civil and brilliant assembly." The opposition to Bates was so intense that it seems some, including the newspapers, expected there to be some sort of protest at his ordination, but nothing ever materialized.

During his pastorate, the Lord's Supper was administered every six weeks. On the Thursdays preceding, he would preach the Preparatory Lecture. Students in the nearby school were marched to the meetinghouse to listen to the lecture, and Bates would visit the school on Mondays to quiz students on the catechism.

Towards the end of his tenure in Dedham, the entire choir resigned, en masse. It is not clear why from the records, but Bates missed them and worked to get them back. He also demonstrated a sense of superiority over his own flock. By 1808, even Fisher Ames would have enough with Bates and would join Dedham's Anglican church.

He asked to be dismissed from the church at a parish meeting in November 1817 to accept the presidency of Middlebury College. It is assumed that, due to his differing political beliefs and his politically tinged sermons, that many in the congregation were glad to let him go.

The church called for a council of churches to dissolve the bond between themselves and their pastor, but the parish refused to go along. They did, however, vote to simply dismiss him. A council was held anyway on February 4, 1818. His last sermon was delivered February 5, the pastorate was terminated on the 20th, and Bates left Dedham on 28 February. Bates Court in Dedham is named after him.

== Political views ==
Politically, he was an ardent Federalist while Dedham and the church were strongly anti-Federalist. Though he was not as liberal as some had hoped, his sermons often were intolerant of those whose politics who differed from his own and were not well received. He believed Thomas Jefferson to be an infidel and that his followers were, at best, doubtful Christians. He was a "high-toned Calvinist school," and he was not particularly charitable towards those of other denominations.

Just after midnight on the Fourth of July, 1809, a group of Republicans dragged the old town cannon to just below Bates' bedroom window. They stuffed it with sod from his lawn and were about to set it off when Bates appeared in his nightshirt. Not recognizing him immediately, one celebrant yelled "Get out of the way, you old bugger, or you'll get your brains blown out!" Bates and his bucket of water convinced the crowd to leave, but they soon returned. They fired the cannon, which was more than 150 years old, and awoke Bates again to the sound of shattering windowpanes.

When news of victory in the War of 1812 reached Dedham, the old town cannon was dragged to the First Church green to celebrate. Bates opposed the firing, so he went there with a bucket of water to douse the fuse before it could be lit. Pitt Butterfield, a republican and captain of the artilierists, "faced the church militant and in language more forcible than elegant gave the other party to understand that any interference with the loading or firing of the field piece would result in a fight then and there and that the broadcloth of a priest would not protect a meddling and domineering politician." Bates backed off. The cannon was fired.

== Academic career ==
From 1818 to 1839, Bates was president of Middlebury College. During his tenure, Bates helped to stabilize the struggling institution and oversaw the construction of the Old Chapel, an icon of the college that is on the National Register of Historic Places. He was elected a Fellow of the American Academy of Arts and Sciences in 1834. He was Chaplain of the United States House of Representatives for the twenty–sixth Congress. (Note: Smith has it as chaplain of the Senate.) In 1843 he became minister at Dudley, Massachusetts, where he remained until his death, aged 77.

His family still lives on today, all over Massachusetts.

== Works cited ==
- Worthington, Erastus (1827). The history of Dedham: from the beginning of its settlement, in September 1635, to May 1827. Dutton and Wentworth.
- Smith, Frank (1936). A History of Dedham, Massachusetts. Transcript Press, Incorporated.
- Hanson, Robert Brand (1976). Dedham, Massachusetts, 1635-1890. Dedham Historical Society.
- Warren, Charles (1931). Jacobin and Junto: Or, Early American Politics as Viewed in the Diary of Dr. Nathaniel Ames, 1758-1822. Harvard University Press.

Religious titles
Preceded by Levi R. Reese	Chaplain of the United States House of Representatives; February 4, 1840 – December 15, 1840	Succeeded by Thomas W. Braxton
Academic offices
Preceded by Henry Davis	3rd President of Middlebury College; 1818–1839	Succeeded by Benjamin Labaree
