= Cornelius P. Kitchel =

American politician

Cornelius Porter Kitchel (October 7, 1875 – January 3, 1947) was the Mayor of Englewood, New Jersey from 1930 to 1933 and the sixth attorney-in-chief of the Legal Aid Society from 1905 to 1906.

== Ancestry ==
Kitchel was a grandson of Harvey Denison Kitchel, a Congregationalist minister and the president of Middlebury College in Middlebury, Vermont, from 1866 to 1975. He was an uncle of Denison Kitchel, the Phoenix lawyer who was national campaign manager for the 1964 presidential bid waged by U.S. Senator Barry M. Goldwater of Arizona against the incumbent, Lyndon B. Johnson of Texas.
