= James Isbell Armstrong =

American academic

James Isbell Armstrong (April 20, 1919 – December 16, 2013) was an American academic who was President of Middlebury College. He was born in 1919 in Princeton. Armstrong was appointed as Middlebury's 12th president in 1963 and served until 1975. Armstrong graduated from Princeton University in 1941 and completed his Ph.D. there in 1949. He served as a professor of classics and Associate Dean without Portfolio at Princeton prior to his arrival at Middlebury.

Armstrong led Middlebury through the national political upheaval of the 1960s. On campus, student life for men and women was fully integrated for the first time. He created the month-long Winter Term which allows students to spend four weeks in January to enroll in one intensive course or pursue independent research or internships. Armstrong is credited with laying the groundwork for Middlebury's emergence as a nationally renowned institution, significantly growing the college's enrollment, endowment and physical plant.

During Armstrong's tenure, the campus saw new styles of architecture reflecting changing national taste, including several controversial buildings. These include the Christian A. Johnson Memorial Building, the Science Center (demolished in 2001), and what has become known as Freeman International Center; all departed from the campus' traditional Georgian Revival style by adopting Brutalist architectural forms and exposed concrete.

Armstrong died on December 16, 2013, aged 94.

Preceded by Samuel Somerville Stratton	President of Middlebury College; 1963–1975	Succeeded by Olin Clyde Robison
