= Two Open Rectangles, Excentric, Variation VI =

Sculpture in Middlebury, Vermont

- Artist: George Rickey(1907-2002)
- Year: 1976
- Dimensions: 3.7 m × 0.91 m (12 ft × 3 ft)
- Location: Middlebury College Museum of Art; Middlebury, Vermont; 44°0′40.53″N 73°10′36.85″W

Two Open Rectangles, Excentric, Variation VI, is a public artwork by American artist George Rickey, located on the Middlebury College campus, outside of the Christian A. Johnson Memorial Building, in Middlebury, Vermont, United States. This kinetic sculpture of stainless steel consists of two rotating open rectangles attached with bearings on a u-shaped mount on an upright arm in a steel base. It measures approximately 12 feet high by 3 feet wide.

== Description ==
This stainless steel sculpture is composed of two rotating open rectangles attached with bearings on a u-shaped mount on an upright arm is a steel base. The rectangles move with the wind in a yaw, pitch and roll. The steel base is painted grey in color and has a silver colored metal plate label attached to it with screws.

== Information ==
The sculpture replaced a smaller work by Rickey, Two Open Rectangles, Excentric, Variation III, which was stolen from its pedestal in front of the Middlebury College Johnson Building on August 15, 1976. Although the artist and the college were disappointed by the theft, the occasion did permit the artist to produce a similar, larger sculpture that would hold up to the scale of the Johnson Building's architecture.

It, or a near replica, recently (September 2019) has been spotted in Sydney G. Walton Square, San Francisco.

=== Acquisition ===
The sculpture was commissioned in 1976 by the Middlebury College Friends of the Art Museum. The purchase was funded by a matching grant from the National Endowment for the Arts and the Friends of the Art Museum's Acquisition Fund. This work was the first outdoor sculpture acquired for the Middlebury College campus.

== Condition ==
This sculpture's condition was described as being well-maintained in 1992 as part of Save Outdoor Sculpture!, a campaign organized by Heritage Preservation: The National Institute of Conservation partnered with the Smithsonian Institution, specifically the Smithsonian American Art Museum. Throughout the 1990s, over 7,000 volunteers cataloged and assessed the condition of over 30,000 publicly accessible statues, monuments, and sculptures installed as outdoor public art across the United States. In Vermont, the survey was sponsored by the Vermont Museum and Gallery Alliance from 1992-1993 where 110 volunteers surveyed 242 sculptures dating from 1740 to 1993. The archives from the project are maintained by the Vermont Historical Society.

== See also ==
- Stainless steel
