= Benjamin Labaree =

American minister and college president

President of Middlebury College
- In office 1840–1866
- Preceded by: Joshua Bates
- Succeeded by: Harvey Denison Kitchel

Personal details
- Born: June 3, 1801; Charlestown, New Hampshire
- Died: November 15, 1883 (aged 82); Walpole, New Hampshire

Benjamin Labaree (June 3, 1801 – November 15, 1883) was a minister, professor and the longest serving president of Middlebury College from 1840 until 1866.

Labaree was born in Charlestown, New Hampshire. He was an 1828 graduate of Dartmouth College, as well as a recipient of graduate degrees from the University of Vermont and Dartmouth.

His two sons were John C. Labaree, a Congregational minister at Randolph, Massachusetts, and Benjamin Labaree, a Presbyterian missionary to Persia from 1861 until his death in 1904.

Preceded by Joshua Bates	4th President of Middlebury College; 1840–1866	Succeeded by Harvey Denison Kitchel
