= Gamaliel Painter =

American politician (1742–1819)

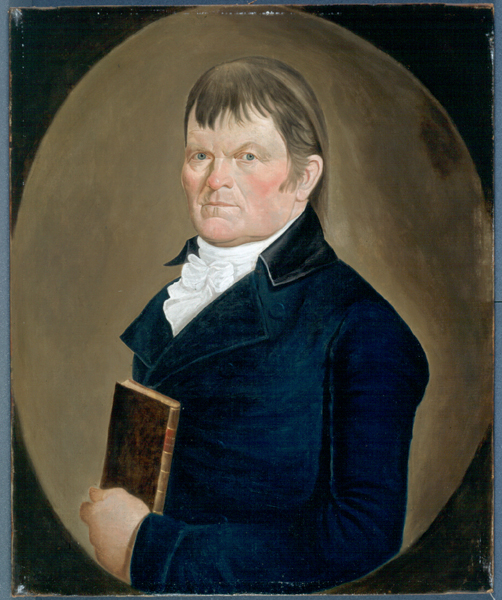
- portrait by William Jennys
- Born: 22 May 1742; New Haven
- Died: 21 May 1819 (aged 76); Middlebury
- Occupation: Politician
- Position held: member of the Vermont House of Representatives

Gamaliel Painter (May 22, 1742 – May 21, 1819) was an American politician and a key figure in the founding of Middlebury, Vermont, and Middlebury College. Painter was raised in New Haven, Connecticut and had the goal of becoming a farmer. Following his move to Middlebury, Vermont Painter served in numerous roles: a soldier, Jurist, Sheriff and State Representative. He went on to have three children, all who passed before his death. Painter left a legacy at Middlebury College through his walking cane and his part in the college's founding.

== Life and legacy ==
Painter was born to Shubael and Elizabeth (née Dunbar) Painter in New Haven, Connecticut Colony.

Painter's first wife, Abigail (née Chipman) Painter, was the sister of John Chipman, the first settler of Middlebury in 1767. At her prompting, the Painters themselves settled in Middlebury in 1773. He purchased fifty acres along Otter Creek, eventually building a number of mills and selling smaller plots of land or donating them for public buildings, including the courthouse and Congregational church.

During the American Revolutionary war, the town of Middlebury was evacuated, and Painter had left with the others but remained in the state. He was known to travel to British-possessed Fort Crown Point as a spy numerous times.

Painter served in a number of political offices: member of the Vermont Constitutional Convention (1777), judge of the Addison County Court (1785, 1787–1794), sheriff of Addison County (1786), and member of the Vermont House of Representatives (1788–1792).

Painter's first wife died in April 21, 1790. Their first child Joseph died in 1804, and their second child drowned in the creek in 1797. Painter's second wife, Victoria Ball of Salisbury, CT, died in June 1806. Their daughter Abby Victoria died in December 1818. His third wife, Ursula Bull of Litchfield, CT, survived him.

Painter is most known for his association with Middlebury College. Painter was one of the people who obtained a charter for the college from the Vermont General Assembly. He presided over the construction of the college's first building, Painter Hall, built from 1812 to 1816. Upon his death, he left most of his estate, $13000, to the college.

Painter's bequest included his walking cane. The cane is employed as the institutional mace for official events, such as freshman convocation, where it is passed around to new students, and Middlebury College students are given a replica of the cane upon graduation. The cane has its own song, "Gamaliel Painter's Cane," penned in 1917:

When Gamaliel Painter died, he was Middlebury's pride,
A sturdy pioneer without a stain;
And he left his all by will, to the college on the hill,
And included his codicil cane.
Oh, its rap rap rap, and it's tap tap tap,
If you listen you can hear it sounding plain;
For a helper true and tried, as the generations glide,
There is nothing like Gamaliel Painter's cane.
