= Olin Clyde Robison =

American academic administrator (1936–2018)

13th President of Middlebury College
- In office 1975–1990
- Preceded by: James Isbell Armstrong
- Succeeded by: Timothy Light

Personal details
- Born: May 12, 1936 Anacoco, Louisiana, U.S.
- Died: October 22, 2018 (aged 82) Baltimore, Maryland, U.S.
- Spouse: Sylvia Margaret Potter
- Children: 3

Olin Clyde Robison (May 12, 1936 – October 22, 2018) was an American academician who served as the thirteenth president of Middlebury College, 1975–1990.

A native of Anacoco, Louisiana, Robison studied at Baylor University and Southwestern Theological Seminary, and received a D.Phil. from Oxford in 1963. He held various positions in the Johnson administration, namely in the Peace Corps and Department of State. He later served as provost at Bowdoin College before being elected president of Middlebury. A personal and professional interest for Robison was the Soviet Union and its political relations with the United States. He participated in numerous trips sponsored by the State Department and non-governmental organizations to Moscow and environs.

Robison's tenure at Middlebury saw growth in student enrollment and physical infrastructure, and the conversion of fraternities to less exclusive "social houses." He also reinvigorated Middlebury's international reputation through expansion of language teaching and the recruitment of foreign-national students, particularly from the former Soviet Union and East European countries. During his 15-year tenure, he also promoted faculty tenure opportunities through salary increases for research on campus and external locations. He was well regarded for his fundraising capabilities that resulted in significant facilities renovations including the Arts Center. As part of his national and international outreach, he hosted the Dalai Lama on campus in 1985.

Following retirement in 1990, Robison continued to teach before serving as the eighth president of the Salzburg Global Seminar, a non-profit organization based in Salzburg, Austria whose mission is to challenge current and future leaders to develop creative ideas for solving global problems. Robison retired from his position as president and chief executive officer of the Seminar in 2005.

He was married to the former Sylvia Margaret Potter until their divorce and was the father of three sons.

Robison was a Director of American Shared Hospital Services, The Investment Company of America, American Mutual Fund and AMCAP (all of the American Funds Group) and served on the Council (Board) of the Royal Institute of International Affairs in London. He was a frequent commentator on Vermont Public Radio.

Robinson died on October 22, 2018, at the age of 82.

Educational offices
Preceded by James Isbell Armstrong	President of Middlebury College; 1975–1990	Succeeded by Timothy Light
