= Calvin Butler Hulbert =

American college president (1827–1917)

Calvin Hulbert

6th President of Middlebury College
- In office 1875–1880
- Preceded by: Harvey Denison Kitchel
- Succeeded by: Cyrus Hamlin

Personal details
- Born: October 18, 1827 East Sheldon, Vermont
- Died: February 12, 1917 (aged 89) Dennis, Massachusetts
- Education: Dartmouth College

Calvin Butler Hulbert (October 18, 1827 – February 12, 1917) was president of Middlebury College from 1875 until 1880. As president, Hulbert suspended the entire student body of the college following a controversy over hazing. Following this controversy, Hulbert resigned as President under pressure from trustees and returned to his ministry in New Haven, Vt.

== Family ==
Calvin's son Homer Hulbert was an educator in Korea and activist for Korean independence.

Educational offices
Preceded by Harvey Denison Kitchel	President of Middlebury College; 1875–1880	Succeeded by Cyrus Hamlin
