= Samuel Somerville Stratton =

- Born: February 23, 1898; Lynn, Massachusetts
- Died: March 1969 (aged 71)
- Education: Dartmouth College
- Alma mater: Harvard
- Occupation(s): professor of economics and researcher in Harvard and the University of Pittsburgh

Samuel Somerville Stratton (February 23, 1898 – March 1969) served as the eleventh president of Middlebury College, 1943 - 1963.

Born in Lynn, Massachusetts, he was a graduate of Newburyport High School in Newburyport, Massachusetts and Dartmouth College, graduating in 1920 after naval service in World War I. He received an M.A. and Ph.D. from Harvard and served as a professor of economics and researcher there and briefly at the University of Pittsburgh.

Stratton saw Middlebury through most of World War II, when the institution hosted Naval V-12 units, and initiated an extensive program of construction while enlarging the student body and enriching the institution's liberal arts curriculum.

Preceded by Paul Dwight Moody	President of Middlebury College; 1943–1963	Succeeded by James Isbell Armstrong
