= Ketchell =

Ketchell is a surname. Notable people with the surname include:

- Aaron Ketchell (born 1977), Australian former professional rugby league footballer
- James Ketchell (born 1982), British adventurer

== See also ==
- Kitchell, surname
- Stanley Ketchel (1886–1910), American boxer
