= Hudson Mindell Kitchell =

American painter

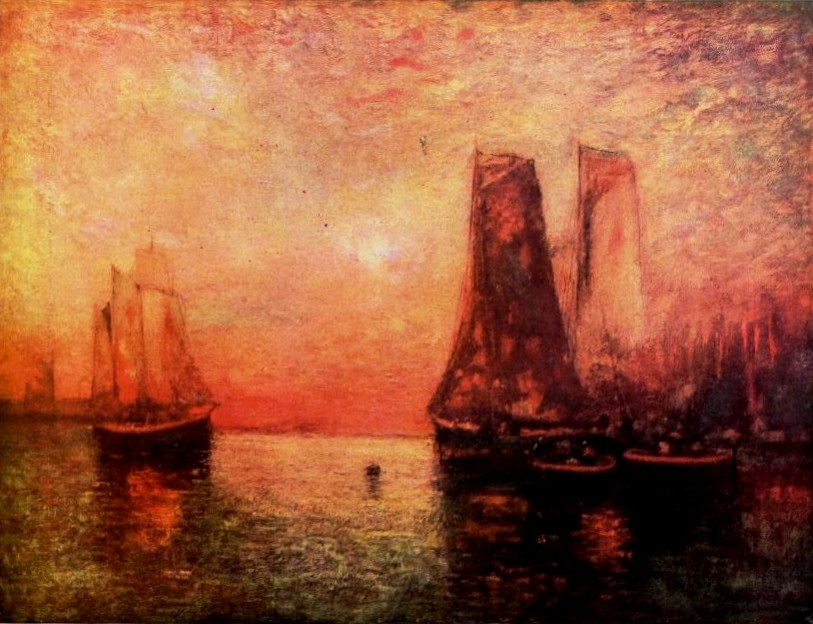
- Sunset Marine by Kitchell
- Born: 1862
- Died: 1944 (aged 81–82)

Hudson Mindell Kitchell (1862–1944) was an early 20th-century American artist known primarily for his luminescent and tonalist landscapes.

Kitchell was a contemporary, friend and associate of Ralph Blakelock; Kitchell's use of color and heavy textures often led to his landscapes being compared to Blakelock's in style and composition. Kitchell painted throughout the United States but is most commonly associated with New York. He exhibited at the Society of Independent Artists in the 1920s.
