= Joseph E. Warner (Michigan politician) =

American congressman in Michigan

Joseph Edwin Warner (March 14, 1870 – April 16, 1956) was a member of the Michigan House of Representatives.

Warner was born and raised in Ypsilanti Township, Michigan. He worked as a dairy farmer when not involved in politics. A Republican, he served in the Michigan House from 1921 to 1930 and again from 1937 to 1956. Warner was a member of the state house at the time of his death.

Warner was a supporter of the operations and growth of Eastern Michigan University. There is a building at Eastern Michigan University named after Warner.

== Sources ==
- Joseph Edwin Warner entry at The Political Graveyard
- plaque on Warner in Joseph Warner Building
