= Joseph Little Warner =

American politician and banker (1803–1865)

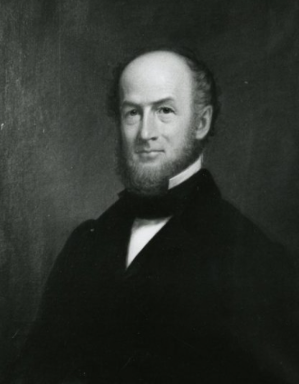

Joseph Warner (1803–1865) was a prominent Middlebury, Vermont, merchant, banker, and a long-serving trustee of Middlebury College

== Life and career ==
Warner was a successful businessman who served as the first cashier of the National Bank of Middlebury from 1831 until his death in 1865. He was involved in Vermont state politics, serving as a member of the State Senate from 1855 to 1856. In 1861, he was one of the electors who voted to place Abraham Lincoln in the presidential chair. He was elected as a trustee of Middlebury College in 1850, he held that position until his death on December 31, 1865.

== Science Hall ==
Joseph Warner's son, Ezra Joseph Warner (Class of 1861), became a successful Chicago businessman and financier. In memory of his father, Ezra Joseph Warner donated the funds for the construction of the Joseph Warner Science Hall at Middlebury College, which opened in 1901 as the college's first dedicated classroom building.

== Family ==
Joseph Warner was married twice: In 1833, he married Jane Meech, and they had three children: James M. (a Civil War Colonel and later Brigadier General), Mary, and Ezra Joseph. In 1860, he married Maria Bates, the daughter of Rev. Joshua Bates, the third President of Middlebury College.
