= Harvey Denison Kitchel =

American academic administrator (1812–1895)

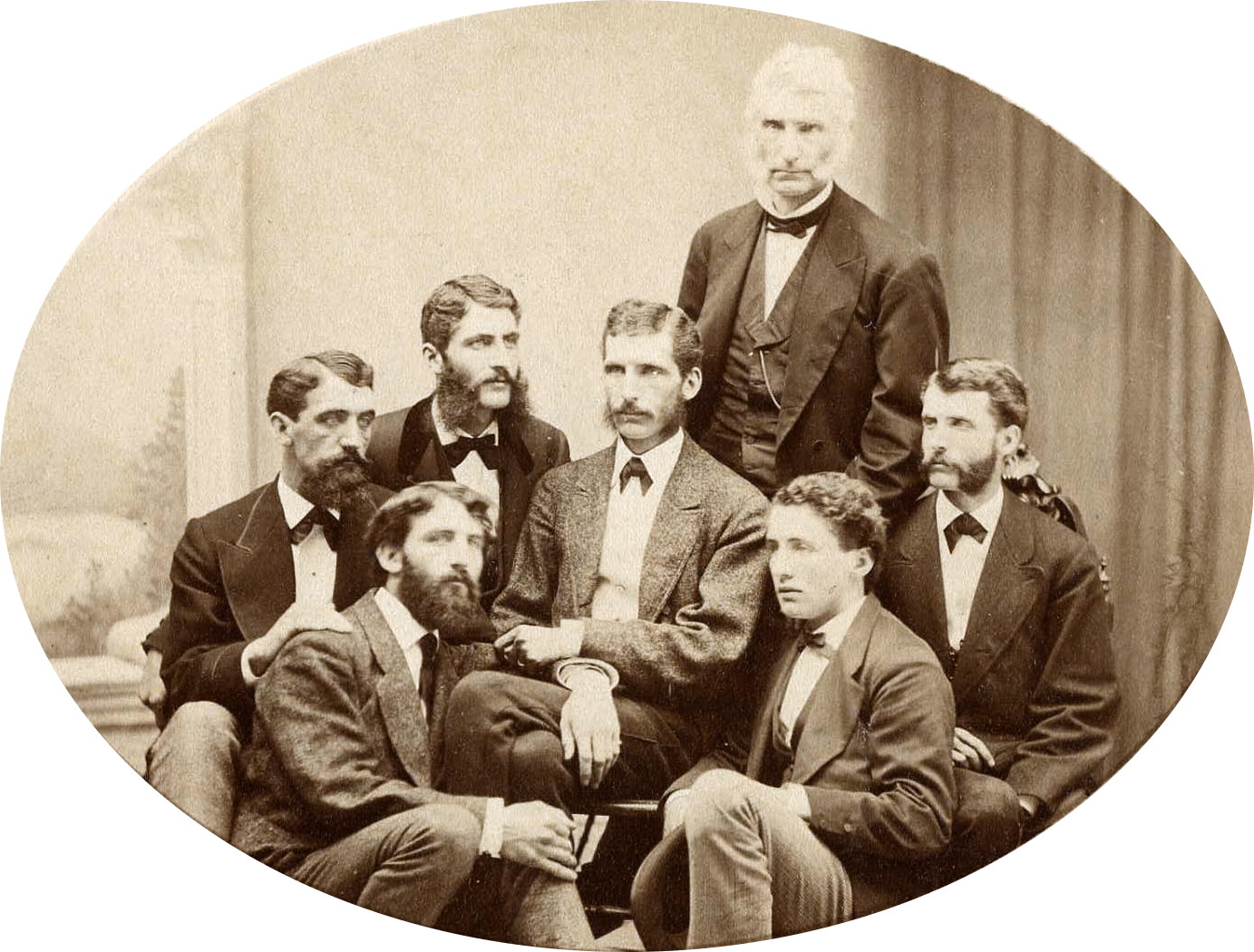
- Kitchel posing with his six sons, circa 1870

President of Middlebury College
- In office 1866–1875
- Preceded by: Benjamin Labaree
- Succeeded by: Calvin Butler Hulbert

Personal details
- Born: February 3, 1812 Washington County, New York, USA
- Died: September 11, 1895 (aged 83) East Liverpool; Columbiana County, Ohio
- Children: Harvey S. Kitchel
- Education: Middlebury College
- Profession: University president; pastor

Harvey Denison Kitchel (February 3, 1812 – September 11, 1895) was a Congregationalist minister who served as the president of Middlebury College in Middlebury, Vermont, from 1866 until 1875.

Kitchel graduated from Middlebury in 1835 and received his Doctor of Divinity in 1858. In 1865, he was awarded an honorary Master of Arts degree from Yale University.

Kitchel was the grandfather of Cornelius P. Kitchel, the mayor of Englewood, New Jersey, from 1930 to 1933. He was the great-grandfather of Denison Kitchel, a Phoenix lawyer who was the national campaign manager of U.S. Senator Barry M. Goldwater's 1964 presidential bid against Lyndon B. Johnson of Texas.

Preceded by Benjamin Labaree	President of Middlebury College; 1866–1875	Succeeded by Calvin Butler Hulbert
