= Middlebury College Language Schools =

Set of schools in Middlebury, Vermont, US

Coordinates: 44.01072°N 73.176443°W

Middlebury Language Schools
- Established: 1915; 111 years ago
- Parent institution: Middlebury College
- Location: Middlebury, Vermont, United States
- Website: www.middlebury.edu/language-schools/

The Middlebury Language Schools are language schools administered by Middlebury College. Immersion and graduate programs are offered in 13 languages during two-, six-, seven-, or eight-week summer sessions. The schools enroll approximately 1,500 students every summer. The pedagogical approach of the programs relies on immersion-based instruction and acquisition. All students in the Language Schools are required to live on campus and must sign and abide by Middlebury College's "Language Pledge", a pledge to use exclusively their target language during their time in the program.

Immersion programs are offered in Abenaki, Arabic, Chinese, English, French, German, Hebrew, Italian, Japanese, Korean, Portuguese, Russian, and Spanish. Additionally, graduate-level instruction is offered in Arabic, Chinese, French, German, Hebrew, Italian, Japanese, Korean, Russian, and Spanish. The Language Schools also offer a Doctor of Modern Languages (D.M.L.) degree, currently unique to Middlebury. Middlebury launched a pilot School of Abenaki in 2020; the first accredited session occurred in the summer of 2021. Students come from all ages and parts of the world.

== Founding and expansion ==
In 1915, the School of German was founded as the first of Middlebury Language Schools by a German professor from Vassar College. The most recent School, the English Language School, was established in 2022.

Middlebury Language Schools have historically all been conducted at the College's campus in Middlebury, Vermont. In Summer 2009 the College opened a satellite campus at Mills College in Oakland, California, to accommodate growth in the enrollments in several of the schools. Since Summer 2020, Middlebury no longer operates at Mills College but instead at Bennington College in Bennington, Vermont; in 2023 Arabic, Italian, and Portuguese were held in Bennington. The English Language School is located in Monterey, California at the Middlebury Institute of International Studies.

== Language instruction ==
All of the thirteen Middlebury Language Schools use an immersion-based approach to language instruction and acquisition. The schools also stress cultural instruction in addition to pure language instruction. Students in all of the Language Schools are required to commit to and sign the "Language Pledge." The Pledge, which has been in continuous use since the 1920s. It reads:

In signing this Language Pledge, I agree to use ______________ as my only language of communication while attending the Middlebury Language Schools. I understand that failure to comply with this Pledge may result in my expulsion from the School without credit or refund.

The focus on immersion learning in a residential environment and the exclusive use of the target language allows the schools to offer the equivalent of a year of language instruction in either six-, seven-, or eight-week summer sessions.

== Graduate study ==
Ten of Middlebury's summer schools – Arabic, Chinese, French, German, Hebrew, Italian, Japanese, Korean, Russian, and Spanish – offer graduate programs in addition to the undergraduate component. These are completed over four six-week summer sessions (over a ten-year period) or with an option of combining the summer sessions with an academic year abroad (Italy, France, Germany, Spain, or Russia) or online, depending on the language. The graduate degree most often conferred is the Master of Arts, but Middlebury also has a Master of Arts in Applied Languages. The MA in French, German, Italian, and Spanish require one summer on the Middlebury campus. A second summer is required for the MA in Arabic, Chinese, Hebrew, Japanese, Korean, and Russian.

=== Doctor of Modern Languages (D.M.L.) ===
Middlebury offers a Doctor of Modern Languages (D.M.L.) degree. Unique to Middlebury, the D.M.L. prepares teacher-scholars in two modern foreign languages, helping them develop as teachers of second-language acquisition, literature, linguistics, and language pedagogy.

== See also ==
- Language school
