= Middlebury College =

Private college in Middlebury, Vermont, US

- Latin: Collegium Medioburiense Viridis Montis
- Motto: Scientia et Virtus (Latin)
- Motto in English: Knowledge and Virtue
- Type: Private liberal arts college
- Established: November 1, 1800; 226 years ago
- Accreditation: NECHE
- Academic affiliations: CLAC; COFHE; NAICU; Oberlin Group
- Endowment: $2.07 billion (June 2026)
- President: Ian Baucom
- Faculty: 377 (2021)
- Undergraduates: 2,653 (2025)
- Location: Middlebury, Vermont, United States; 44°00′32″N 73°10′38″W
- Campus: Rural, 350 acres (140 ha)
- Colors: Blue and White
- Nickname: Panthers
- Sporting affiliations: NCAA Division III – NESCAC; NEISA; EISA
- Mascot: Panther
- Website: middlebury.edu

Middlebury College is a private liberal arts college in Middlebury, Vermont, United States. Founded in 1800 by Congregationalists, Middlebury was the first operating college or university in Vermont.

In the fall of 2024, the college enrolled 2,760 undergraduates from all 50 states and 74 countries and offers 45 majors in the arts and humanities as well as joint engineering programs. In addition to its undergraduate liberal arts program, the school also has graduate schools, the Middlebury College Language Schools, the Bread Loaf School of English, and the Middlebury Institute of International Studies at Monterey, as well as its C.V. Starr-Middlebury Schools Abroad international programs. Middlebury's 31 varsity teams are the Middlebury Panthers and compete in the NCAA Division III's New England Small College Athletic Conference.

== History ==
=== 19th century ===
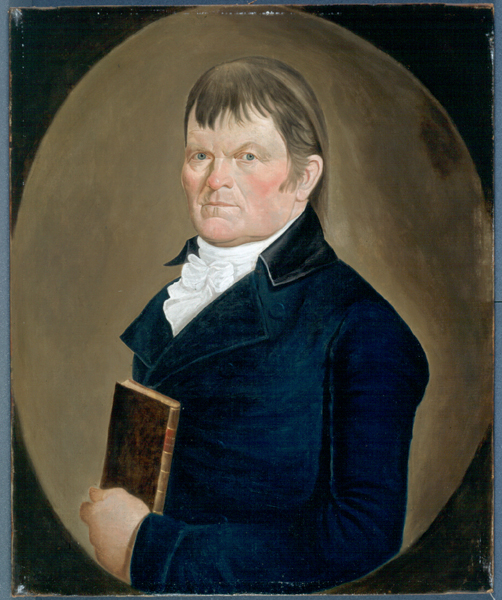
Gamaliel Painter (1742–1819), founder of Middlebury College

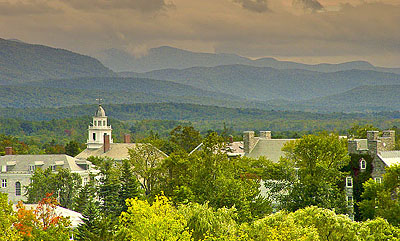
Old Chapel with the Green Mountains in the distance

Middlebury received its founding charter on November 1, 1800, as an outgrowth of the Addison County Grammar School, which had been founded three years earlier in 1797. The college's first president—Jeremiah Atwater—began classes a few days later, making Middlebury the first operating college or university in Vermont. One student named Aaron Petty graduated at the first commencement held in August 1802. The college's founding religious affiliation was loosely Congregationalist. Yet the idea for a college was that of town fathers rather than clergymen, and Middlebury was clearly "the Town's College" rather than the Church's. Chief among its founders were Seth Storrs and Gamaliel Painter, the former credited with the idea for a college and the latter as its greatest early benefactor. In addition to receiving a diploma upon graduation, Middlebury graduates also receive a replica of Gamaliel Painter's cane. Painter bequeathed his original cane to the college and it is carried by the college President at official occasions including first-year convocation and graduation. Alexander Twilight, class of 1823, was the first black graduate of any college or university in the United States; he also became the first African American elected to public office, joining the Vermont House of Representatives in 1836. Joseph Little Warner was the namesake of Joseph Warner Science Hall at Middlebury. At its second commencement in 1804, Middlebury granted Lemuel Haynes an honorary master's degree, the first advanced degree ever bestowed upon an African American.

In 1883, the trustees voted to accept women as students in the college, making Middlebury one of the first formerly all-male liberal arts colleges in New England to become a coeducational institution. The first female graduate—May Belle Chellis—received her degree in 1886. As valedictorian of the class of 1899, Mary Annette Anderson became the first African-American woman elected to Phi Beta Kappa.

=== 20th century ===
The college's centennial in 1900 began a century of physical expansion beyond the three buildings of Old Stone Row. York and Sawyer designed the Egbert Starr Library (1900), a Beaux-Arts edifice later expanded and renamed the Axinn Center, and Warner Hall (1901). Growth in enrollment and the endowment led to continued expansion westward. McCullough Hall (1912) and Voter Hall (1913) featured gymnasium and laboratories, respectively, adopting Georgian Revival styling while confirming the campus standard of grey Vermont limestone, granite, and marble.

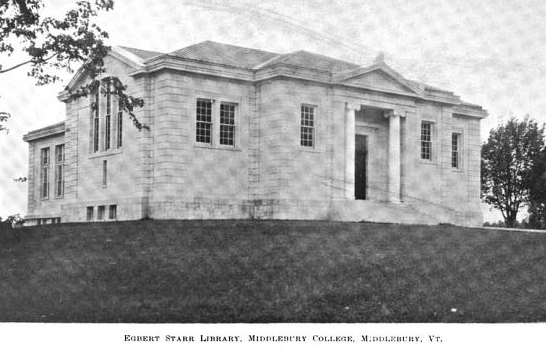
Starr Library, Middlebury's original library, circa 1900

In 1914 and subsequent decades, Middlebury College offered courses in eugenics in fields such as pedagogy, biology, and sociology. The college had "extensive involvement in the eugenics movement." The year-long, mandatory "Orientating Course for Freshmen" in 1925 included the subject "Eugenics" and explained that in the previous year this had been taught in this class as "What Has Civilization to Expect from Eugenics." The 1930 Fourth Annual Report of the Eugenics Survey of Vermont noted that Middlebury College President Paul Moody was Chairman of the Committee that supervised the Survey. Middlebury biology supervisor, professor A.E. Lambert lectured outside the college on the "Science of Modern Welfare," based on "heredity and eugenics." Middlebury biology professor Owen Wesley Mills was a member of the Second International Congress of Eugenics.

The national fraternity Kappa Delta Rho was founded in Painter Hall on May 17, 1905. Middlebury College abolished fraternities in the early 1990s, but the organization continued on campus in the less ritualized form of a social house. Due to a policy at the school against single-sex organizations, the house was forced to coeducate during the same period as well. The German Language School, founded in 1915 under the supervision of then-President John Martin Thomas, began the tradition of the Middlebury College Language Schools. These Schools, which take place on campus during the summer, enroll about 1,350 students in the Arabic, Chinese, French, German, Hebrew, Italian, Japanese, Portuguese, Russian, and Spanish Language Schools.

Middlebury President Paul Dwight Moody began the American tradition of a National Christmas Tree in 1923 when the college donated a 48-foot balsam fir for use at the White House. The tree was illuminated when Vermont native Calvin Coolidge flipped an electric switch in the first year of his presidency. The Bread Loaf School of English, Middlebury's graduate school of English, was established at the college's Bread Loaf Mountain campus in 1920. The Bread Loaf Writers' Conference was established in 1926. In 1978, the Bread Loaf School of English expanded to include a campus at Lincoln College, Oxford University. In 1991, the School expanded to include a campus at St. John's College in New Mexico, and to the University of North Carolina, Asheville, in 2006. The C.V. Starr-Middlebury Schools Abroad began in 1949 with the school in Paris; they now host students at 38 sites in Argentina, Brazil, China, Cameroon, Chile, France, Germany, India, Italy, Japan, Jordan, Morocco, Russia, Spain, Uruguay, United Kingdom, and Puerto Rico. The Center for Medieval and Renaissance Studies (CMRS) was founded as an educational charity in 1975 by Drs John and Sandy Feneley in Oxford, England, establishing a facility at St. Michael's Hall in 1978, including the Feneley Library, and close links with Keble College, Oxford; in 2014, CMRS became part of Middlebury College Schools Abroad as Middlebury-CMRS, offering U.S. undergraduates an Oxford Humanities Research Program and Middlebury Museum Studies in Oxford. In 1965, Middlebury established its Environmental Studies program, creating the first undergraduate Environmental Studies program in the U.S. Nationally affiliated fraternities were abolished in 1990; some chose to become co-educational social houses which continue today.

=== 21st century ===
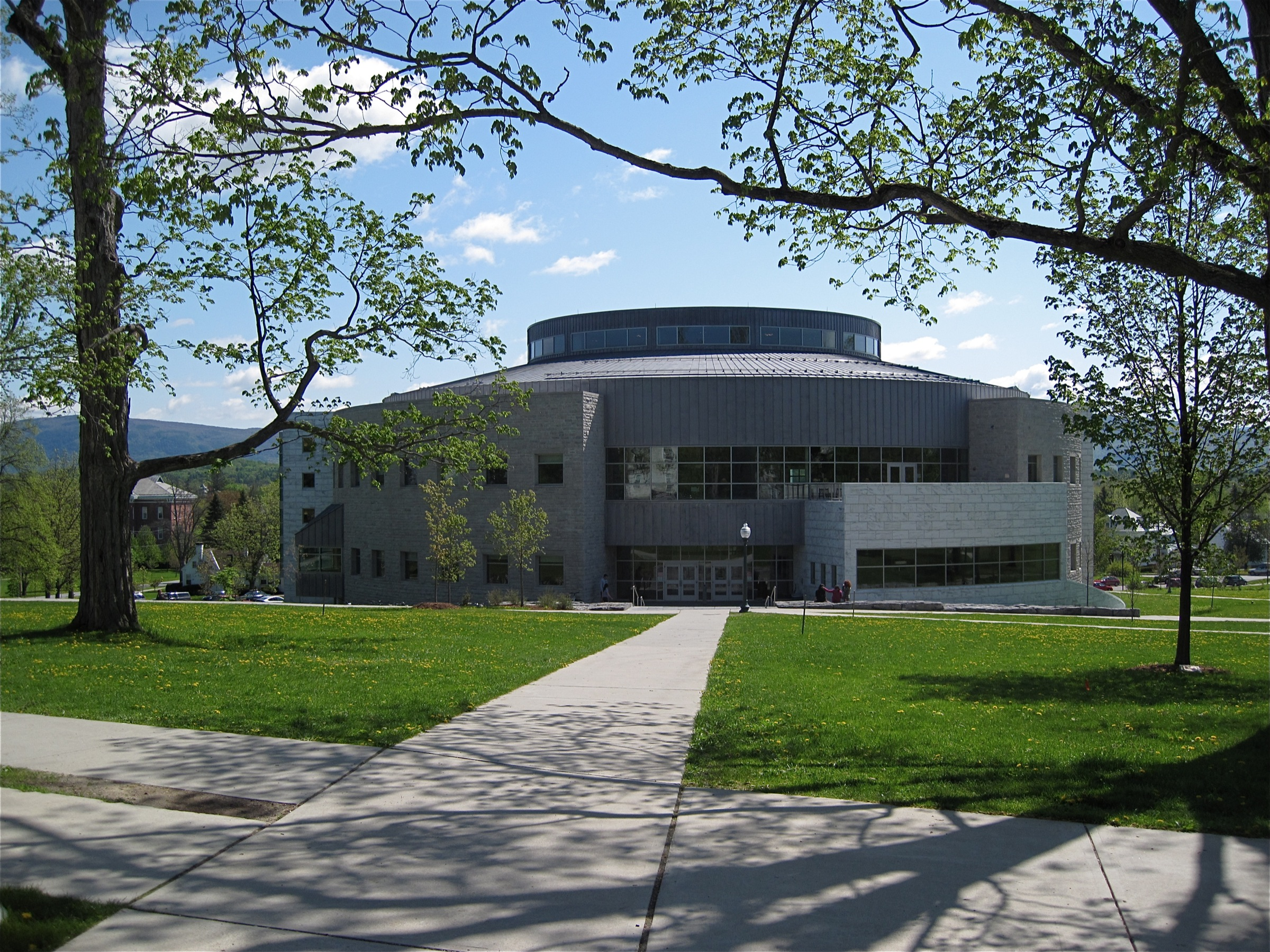
The Davis Family Library, opened in 2004

In May 2004, an anonymous benefactor made a $50 million donation to Middlebury. It is the largest cash gift the school has ever received. The donor asked only that Middlebury name its recently built science building, Bicentennial Hall, after outgoing President John McCardell Jr. As of July 2014, Middlebury's endowment stood at approximately $1 billion.

In 2005, Middlebury signed an affiliation agreement with the Monterey Institute of International Studies, a graduate school in Monterey, California. On June 30, 2010, the Monterey Institute was officially designated as a graduate school of Middlebury College.

In the summer of 2008, Middlebury and the Monterey Institute of International Studies launched a collaborative program to offer summer language immersion programs in Arabic, Chinese, French, German, Italian, and Spanish to middle and high school students through the Middlebury-Monterey Language Academy (MMLA). In January 2014, as part of a new brand identity system, Middlebury announced that the Monterey Institute of International Studies would be renamed the Middlebury Institute of International Studies at Monterey.

External videos
- Q&A interview with Middlebury College Professor Allison Stanger on her experiences related to the Charles Murray guest speaker incident, October 29, 2017, C-SPAN

On March 2, 2017, political scientist Charles Murray was shouted down by students at a campus event, and prevented from speaking at the McCullough Student Center. Murray had been named a white nationalist by the Southern Poverty Law Center, and has been criticized for a teenaged incident in 1960 where he burned a cross on a hill in his hometown of Newton, Iowa, an act which Murray himself later characterized as "incredibly dumb". After the protest, Murray's talk was moved to Wilson Hall and published online; however, after the talk there was a violent attack by protesters who attempted to obstruct and damage the vehicle of Bill Burger (the Vice President of communications at Middlebury College), Murray, and Middlebury professor Allison Stanger; Stanger was injured in the attack, requiring her hospitalization with a neck injury and concussion. Middlebury President Laurie L. Patton responded after the event, saying the school would respond to the clear violations of college policy by students that occurred. Some students (and faculty) felt that by refusing to allow Murray to speak, and by injuring Stanger, the Middlebury College student community "trod all over the ideas of free speech this country was founded upon". The school took disciplinary action against 74 students for their involvement in the incident.

In January 2025, the college's trustees appointed Ian Baucom the college's 18th president.

== Academics ==
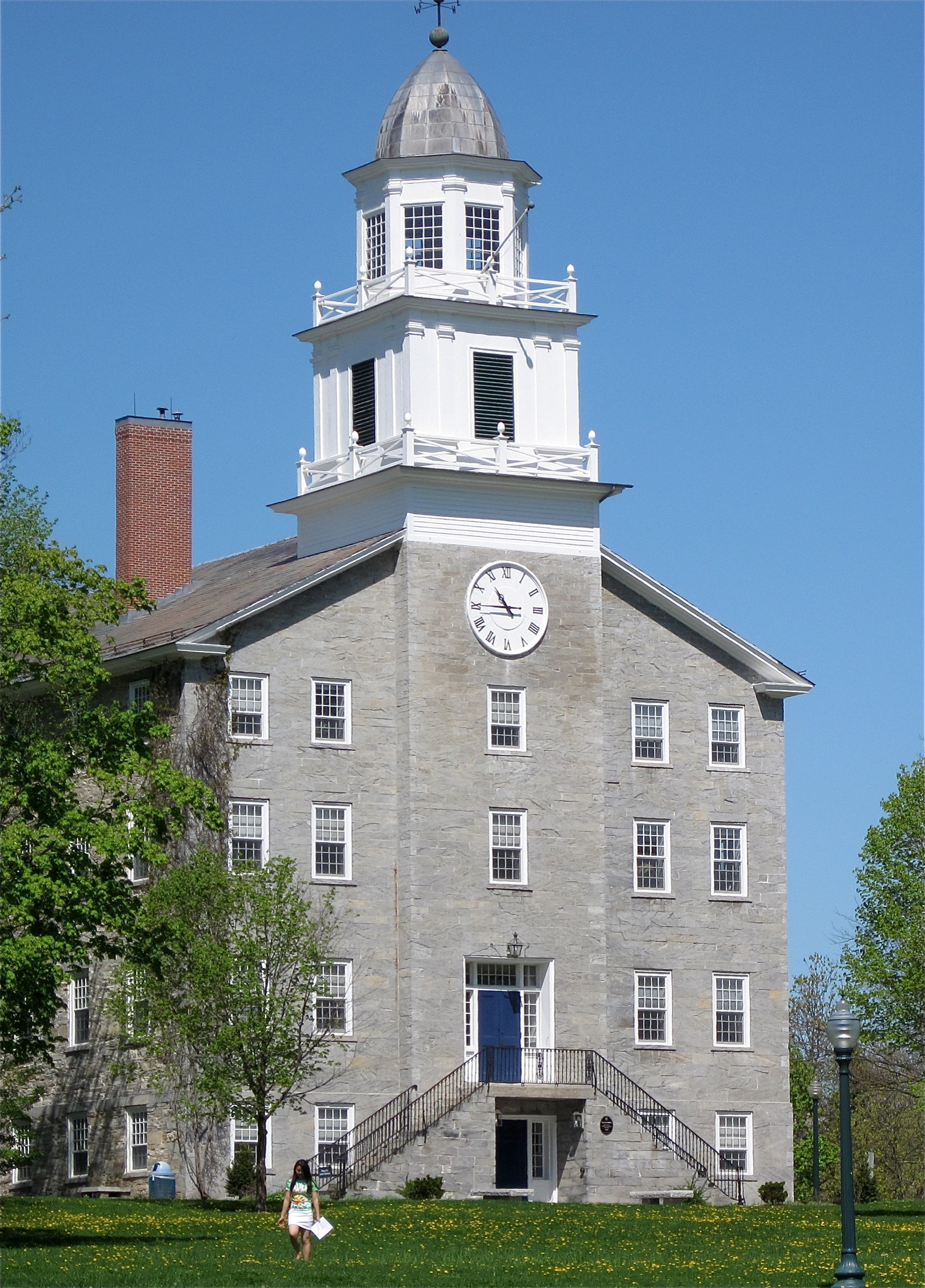
Old Chapel, completed in 1836, served as Middlebury's primary academic building for a century

Founded in 1800, the college enrolls approximately 2,500 undergraduates from all 50 states and 70 countries. The college offers 40 undergraduate departments and programs. Middlebury was the first institution of higher education in the United States to offer an environmental studies major, establishing the major in 1965. Middlebury College is accredited by the New England Commission of Higher Education.

The most popular undergraduate majors at Middlebury by number of 2021 graduates were:

Econometrics & Qualitative Economics (81)
Computer Science (47)
Political Science & Government (47)
Environmental Studies (45)
Neuroscience (37)

The academic year follows a 4–1–4 schedule of two four-course semesters in the autumn and spring plus what is known as a "Winter Term" session in January. The Winter Term, often called "J-Term" for January Term, allows students to enroll in one intensive course, pursue independent research, or complete an off-campus internship. Winter Term courses are taught by a mix of traditional faculty and special instructors.

=== Language schools ===
The Middlebury College Language Schools, which began with the establishment of the School of German in 1915, offer intensive instruction in 10 languages during six-, seven-, or eight-week summer sessions. The schools enroll about 1,350 students every summer. The Schools all use an immersion-based approach to language instruction and acquisition. All students in the Language Schools must sign and abide by Middlebury's "Language Pledge," a pledge to use their target language exclusively during the duration of their time at the school.

Undergraduate instruction, available to undergraduate students, government employees and individuals from professional backgrounds, is offered in Abenaki, Arabic, Chinese, French, German, Hebrew, Italian, Japanese, Portuguese, Russian, Korean, and Spanish.

=== Associated programs ===
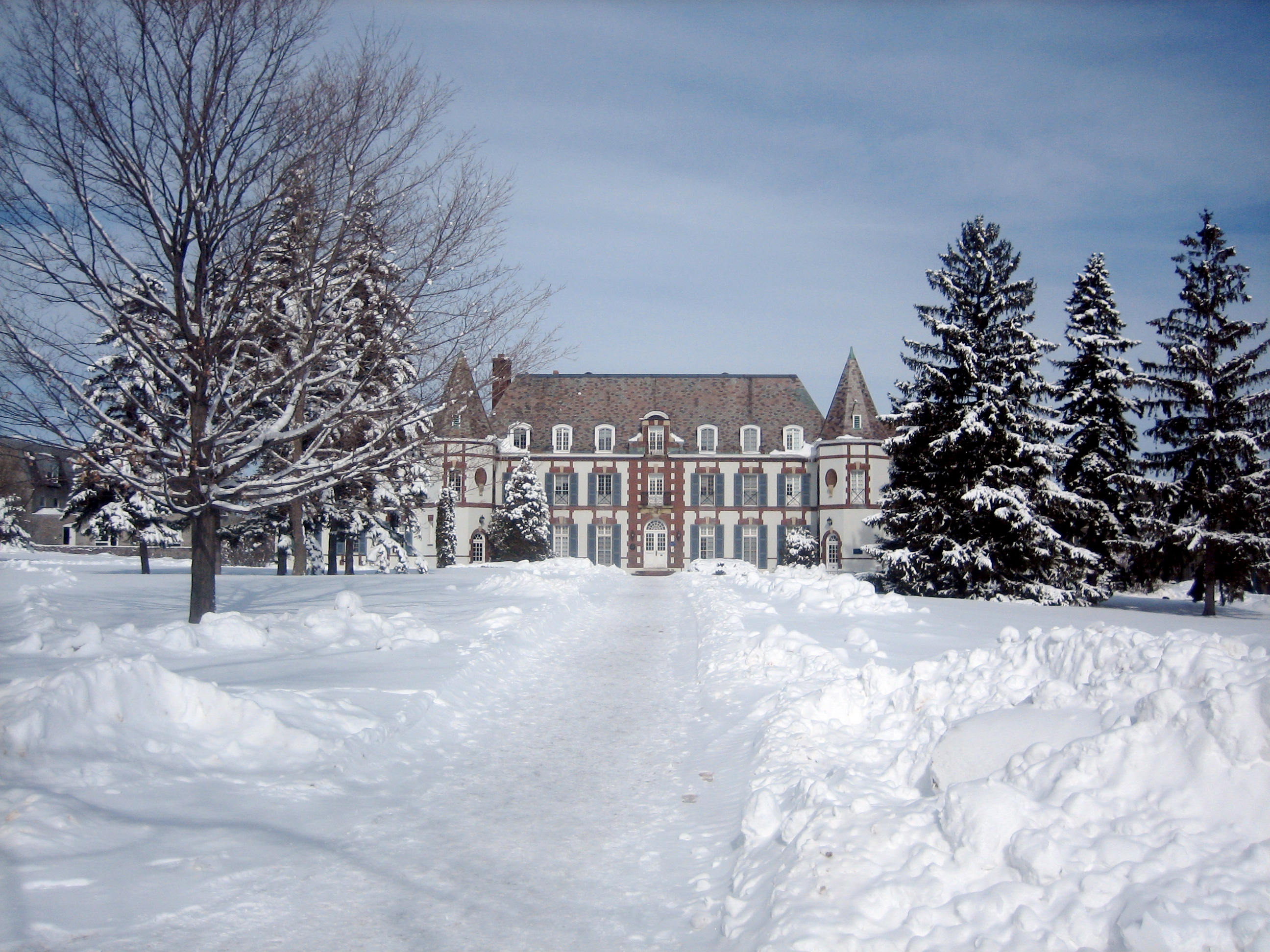
Le Chateau, constructed in 1925, is the home to the college's French department, and serves as a student residential hall

The Middlebury Institute of International Studies at Monterey, in Monterey, California became an affiliate of Middlebury following the signing of an affiliation agreement between the two in December 2005. The Institute currently enrolls 790 graduate students in the fields of international relations, international business, language teaching, and translation and interpretation.

The Middlebury College Language Schools offers a Doctor of Modern Languages. Unique to Middlebury, the D.M.L. prepares teacher-scholars in two modern foreign languages, helping them develop as teachers of second-language acquisition, literature, linguistics, and language pedagogy. Middlebury also offers summer language immersion programs in Arabic, Chinese, French, German, and Spanish to middle and high school students through the Middlebury-Monterey Language Academy.

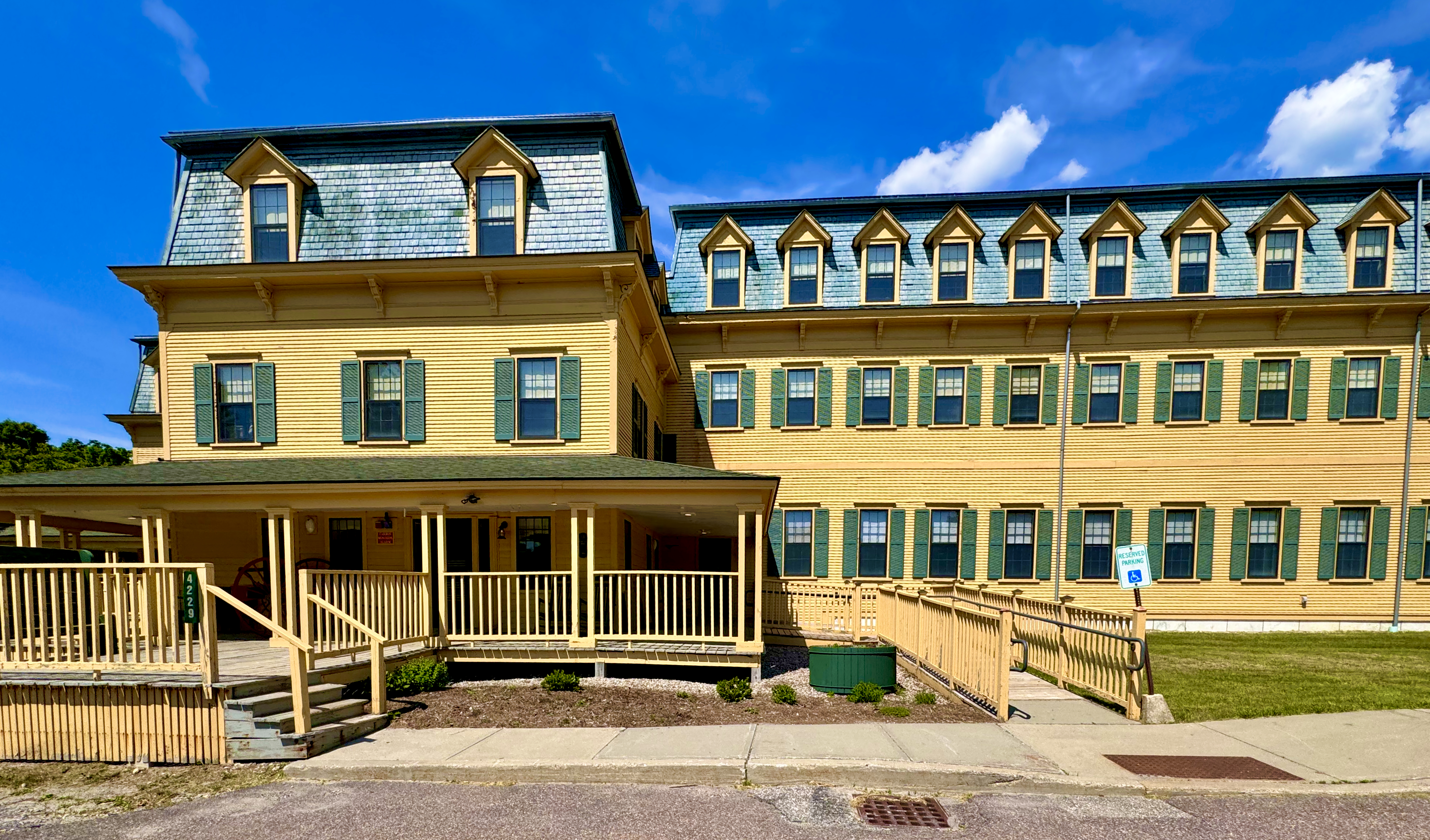
The Bread Loaf School of English in Ripton

The Bread Loaf School of English is based at the college's Bread Loaf Mountain campus in Ripton, just outside Middlebury, in sight of the main ridge of the Green Mountains. The poet Robert Frost is credited as a major influence on the school. Frost "first came to the School on the invitation of Dean Wilfred Davison in 1921. Friend and neighbor to Bread Loaf, (he) returned to the School every summer with but three exceptions for 42 years." Every summer since 1920, Bread Loaf has offered students from around the United States and the world intensive courses in literature, creative writing, the teaching of writing, and theater. Many prominent faculty and staff have been associated with the college.

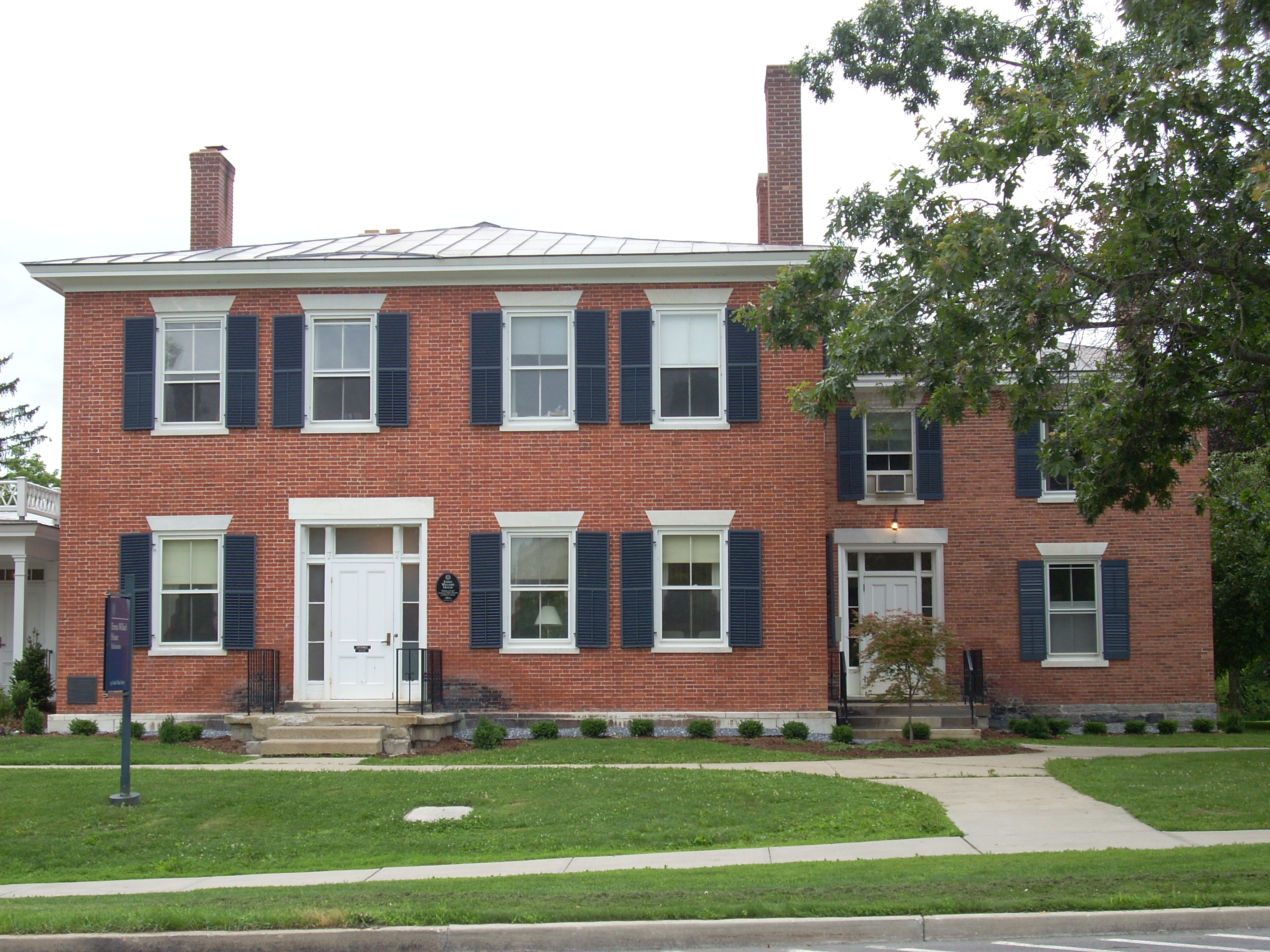
The Emma Willard House, a National Historic Landmark, is Middlebury's Admission Office

The C.V. Starr-Middlebury Schools Abroad, operated by Middlebury College in 17 countries across 5 continents, offer overseas academic programs for undergraduates from various U.S. institutions, as well as graduate-level programs for students from Middlebury College's Language Schools and the Monterey Institute of International Studies.

The Rohatyn Center for Global Affairs, was founded by Felix Rohatyn '49, investment banker, former U.S. Ambassador to France, and founder of Rohatyn Associates. Located at the Robert A. Jones '59 House, the center combines Middlebury's strengths in political, linguistic, and cultural studies to offer internationally focused symposia, lectures, and presentations.

The Center for the Comparative Study of Race and Ethnicity engages in interdisciplinary and comparative approaches for understanding formations of race and ethnicity and their effects on human relations. The Center for Social Entrepreneurship encourages students to develop innovative solutions to address society's most pressing social problems. Programs on Creativity and Innovation (PCI) is a series of initiatives designed to encourage Middlebury students to explore ideas in nonacademic settings.

==== Bread Loaf Writers' Conference ====
In addition to the six-week summer program, Middlebury College's Bread Loaf campus is also the site of the Bread Loaf Writers' Conference for established authors, founded in 1926. It was called by The New Yorker "the oldest and most prestigious writers' conference in the country." The conference is administered by director Michael Collier and assistant director Jennifer Grotz. Many prominent members of society have been associated with the Writers' Conference.

=== Reputation and rankings ===
Academic rankings

Liberal arts
- U.S. News & World Report: 13 (tie) of 211
- Washington Monthly: 8 of 190

National
- Forbes: 51 of 500
- WSJ/College Pulse: 131 of 600

In 2026, U.S. News & World Report ranked Middlebury as tied for 13th out of 211 liberal arts college overall in the U.S. Middlebury tied for 17th in "Best Undergraduate Teaching", and 30th for "Best Value" among liberal arts colleges for 2025."

Washington Monthly ranked the school 8th out of 190 in its 2025 liberal arts college rankings.

The 2022 Parchment student choice college ranking, which tracks student college acceptances of students accepted to multiple schools in order to reveal preference for their chosen school compared to other schools, ranks Middlebury as 47th of 1055 colleges.

== Admissions ==
The Carnegie Foundation classifies Middlebury as a "more selective" institution. For the class of 2026, the college offered admission to 1,955 students out of an applicant pool of 13,028, yielding an overall acceptance of 15%.

Middlebury enrolls around 600 students to begin in the fall semester and an additional 100 to begin in the spring. Those accepted for the fall admissions program begin the academic year in September and are referred to as "Regs." Those accepted for the spring admissions program begin the academic year in February and are referred to as "Febs." Students accepted to the Feb program use the fall semester, called a "Febmester," to travel, volunteer, enroll at other universities, or work. Febs graduate in the annual mid-year commencement at the Middlebury College Snow Bowl.

Tuition, room, and board at Middlebury is $79,800 for the 2022–23 academic year. For the class entering in 2022–23, the average financial aid grant award is $57,078. The college is need-blind for incoming domestic students.

== Campus ==
The spire of Mead Chapel, completed in 1916, rises on the highest elevation of the campus

The 350-acre (1.4 km^{2}) main campus is located in the Champlain Valley between Vermont's Green Mountains to the east and New York's Adirondack Mountains to the west. The campus is situated on a hill to the west of the village of Middlebury, a traditional New England village centered on Otter Creek Falls.

In the fall of 1994 the President and Board of Trustees of Middlebury College adopted a "One Percent for Art" policy. This decision set aside one percent of the cost of any renovation or new construction at the college for the purchase, installation, maintenance, and interpretation of works of art publicly displayed on campus. There are 19 works in Middlebury's campus public art collection, including Frisbee, George Rickey's Two Open Rectangles, Excentric, Variation VI, Tony Smith's Smog, and a version of Robert Indiana's Love series. The collection also includes works by Dan Graham, Scott Burton, Jules Olitski, Joseph Beuys, Matt Mullican, Jenny Holzer, Christian Petersen, Buky Schwartz, George Rickey, Clement Meadmore, and Jonathan Borofsky.

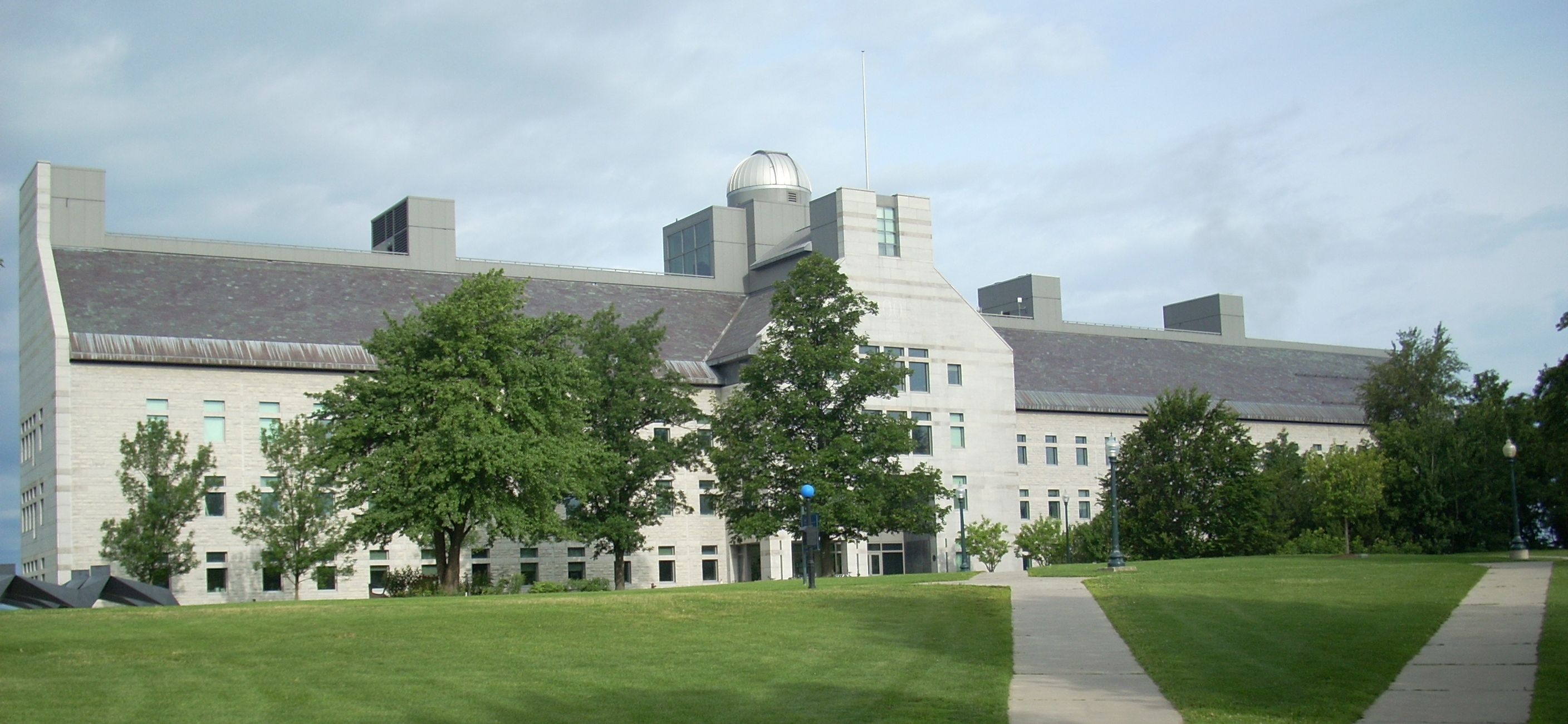
John M. McCardell, Jr. Bicentennial Hall, Middlebury's multidisciplinary science facility

=== Middlebury College Museum of Art ===
In 1992, the museum opened in the Mahaney Arts Center (named after alumnus Kevin Mahaney) that was designed by Hardy Holzman Pfeiffer's architectural firm. It was accredited by the American Association of Museums in 2005.

=== Sustainability ===
Middlebury has incorporated environmental stewardship into its mission statement. The college is a signatory to the American College & University Presidents Climate Commitment and the Talloires Declaration. Additionally, the college has committed to be carbon neutral by 2016. Middlebury was one of six universities to receive a grade of "A−" from the Sustainable Endowments Institute on its College Sustainability Report Card 2008, the highest grade awarded.

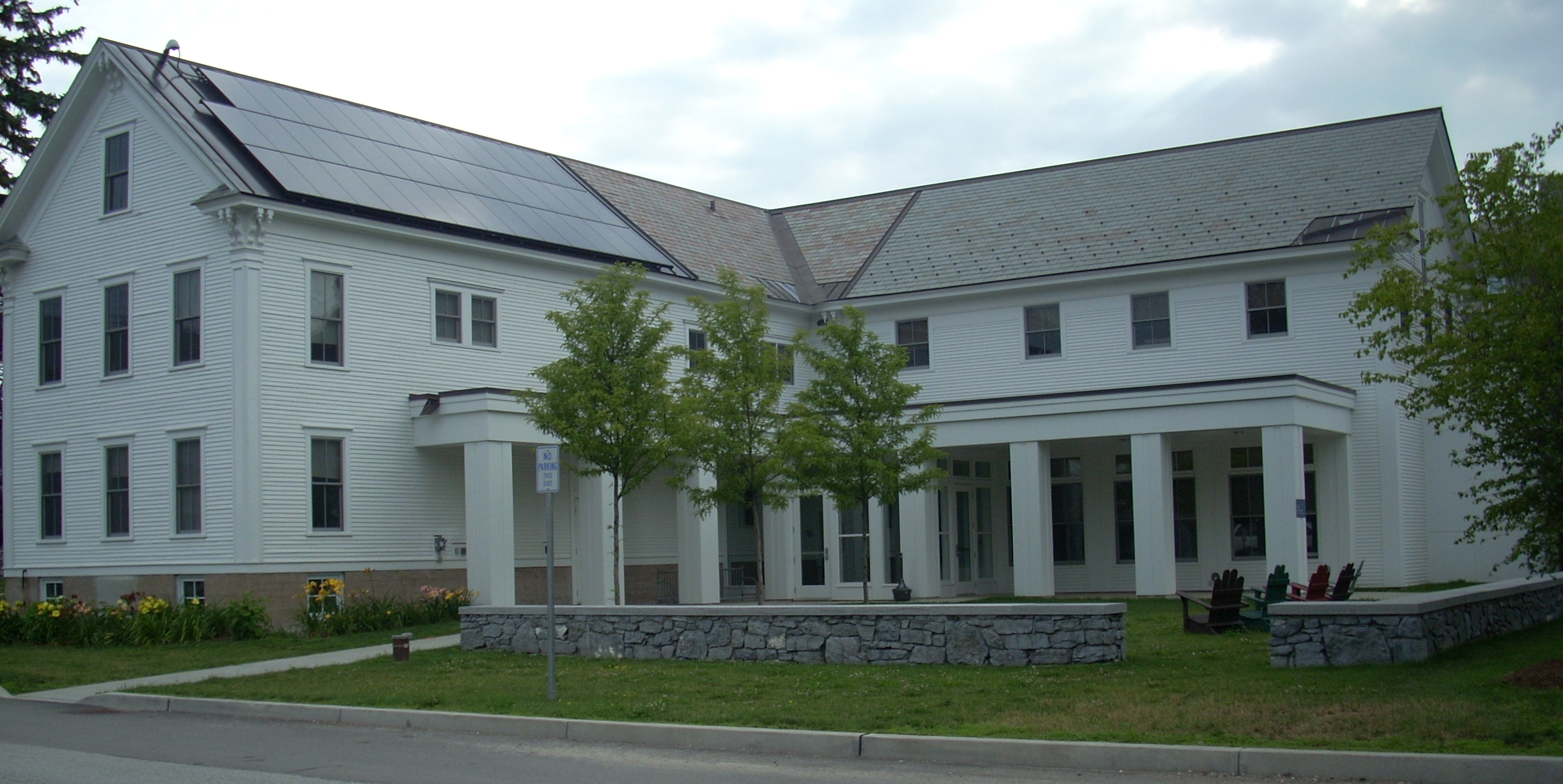
Hillcrest Environmental Center, a platinum LEED-certified building

In 2009, Middlebury opened a state-of-the-art biomass plant on campus that is estimated to cut the college's carbon dioxide output by 40 percent and reduce its use of fuel oil by 50 percent.

In 2010, the Rockefeller Brothers Fund and Middlebury announced the creation of the Sustainable Investments Initiative, a co-mingled fiscal vehicle seeking investments that generate long-term social, environmental, and economic value. The Initiative will seek investments focused on sustainability issues such as clean energy, water, climate science, and green building projects, in an effort to identify businesses positioned to become a part of the worldwide shift to improve energy efficiency, decrease dependence on fossil fuels, and mitigate climate change.

Also in 2010, Middlebury College and Integrated Energy Solutions, a Vermont developer of farm-based methane energy, agreed to explore a bio-methane gas collection and delivery system that could help Middlebury further reduce its use of fossil fuels. Middlebury has agreed to purchase bio-methane gas from IES over a 10-year period, with the agreement contingent on the college raising money to build storage facilities for the gas on campus and retrofit its current heating plant to burn the new fuel.

== Student life ==
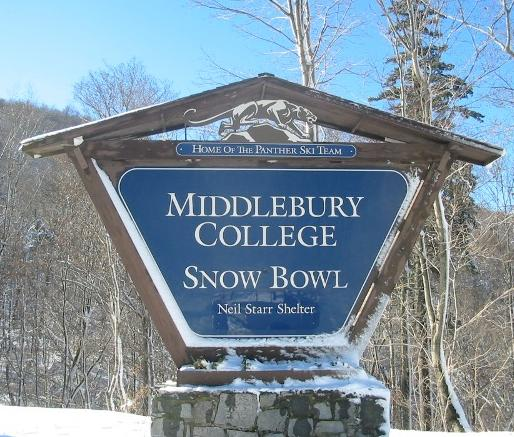
Entrance to the Middlebury College Snow Bowl, the college-owned ski mountain that hosts Winter Carnival ski races and "Feb" graduation

In 2013, Princeton Review ranked Middlebury as one of the top 20 schools in the US for "best quality of life." There are over 140 registered student organizations at Middlebury. Students register for organizations of interest during the Fall Activities Fair in September.

The Middlebury Campus is the student weekly of Middlebury College. The Campus was founded in 1900, and is entirely student-run. The Local Noodle, a satirical student publication founded in 2016, publishes three times a semester.

WRMC-FM is Middlebury's student-volunteer-run radio station.

=== Student body ===
The median family income of Middlebury students is $244,300, with 53% of students coming from the top 5% highest-earning families and 14.2% from the bottom 60%. Middlebury College is the ranked 5th in the country for the most share (23%) of students coming from the top 1% of family income ($630,000 or more per year).

As of the 2022–2023 academic year, the student body consisted of 53% women and 47% men. 95% of the student population was from out of state.

Enrollment by Racial/Ethnic Category 2022–2023
| | Total Undergraduate |
|---|---|
| Hispanic/Latino | 331 |
| Black | 149 |
| White, non-Hispanic | 1,547 |
| Asian | 200 |
| American Indian or Alaska Native | 3 |
| Native Hawaiian or Pacific Islander | 0 |
| Nonresidents* | 331 |
| Two or more races | 194 |
| Race and/or ethnicity unknown | 18 |
| TOTAL | 2,773 |

*Nonresidents are reported separately regardless of race/ethnicity

=== Traditions ===
Middlebury's Winter Carnival is the oldest student-run winter carnival in the country, started in 1923. The Winter Carnival is a weekend-long event and traditionally includes a bonfire and fireworks on the opening night, ski races at the Middlebury College Snow Bowl on Friday and Saturday, and the Winter Ball on Saturday night. The Winter Carnival also puts on the Winter Carnival Ice Show, a figure skating event that showcases performances from local kids and teens, Middlebury students, and guest skaters. Notable guests include Swiss Olympian Alexia Paganini in 2016 and Jimmy Ma in 2015.

Middlebury offers a mid-year graduation for those students who complete coursework at the end of January. These students are usually "Febs," students who began their Middlebury careers as February first-years. The mid-year graduation tradition is for all graduating seniors to ski down the Middlebury College Snow Bowl in their caps and gowns to receive their diplomas.

Middlebury Outdoor Programs organizes outdoor orientations for incoming students in September and February. These orientations involve several days of hiking, rock climbing, kayaking, snowshoeing, and other activities in the wilderness around Middlebury.

Following the New Traditions Contest initiated by President Laurie Patton in the spring of 2018, Middlebury held its first Panther Day on October 20, 2018. The new tradition was held during Homecoming Weekend and included a parade of student clubs and organizations, in an effort to build school spirit. A group of student protesters lined the side of the parade route to call attention to the lack of support by the college for survivors of sexual assault.

=== New England Review ===
The New England Review (NER) is a quarterly literary journal published by Middlebury College.

NER publishes poetry, fiction, translations, and a wide variety of non-fiction in each issue. It has published work by many who have gone on to win major awards such as the Pulitzer Prize, the National Book Award, and the National Book Critics Circle Award.

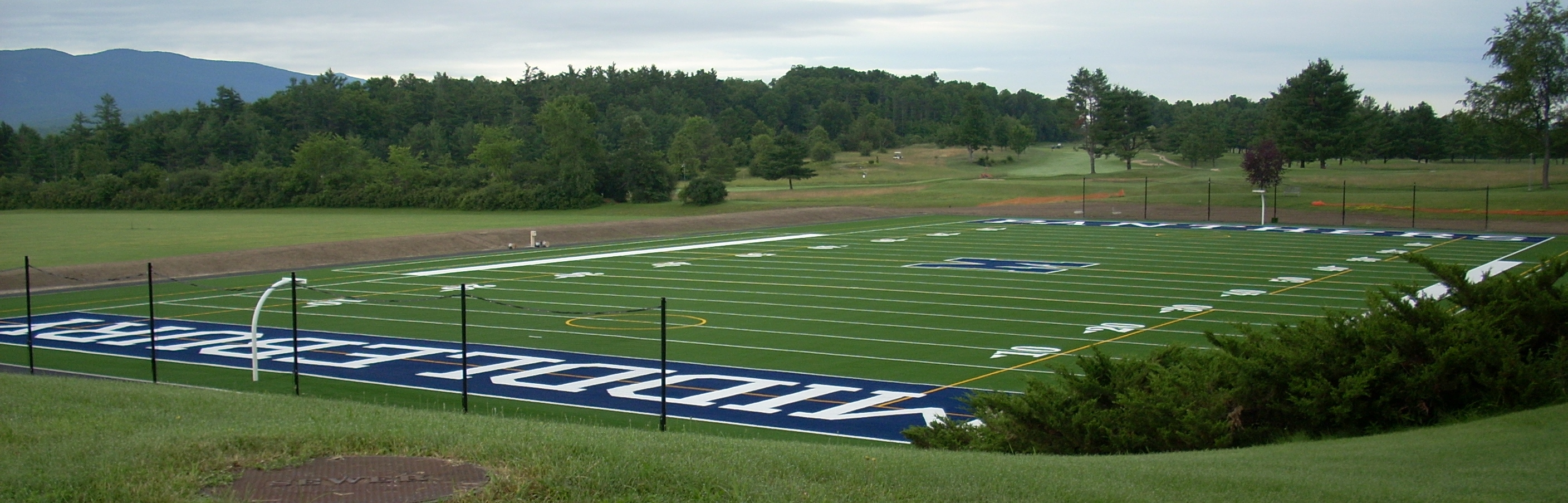
Youngman Field at Alumni Stadium, with the Ralph Myhre 18-hole golf course in the background

=== Athletics ===
Middlebury competes in the New England Small College Athletic Conference. The Panthers lead the NESCAC in total number of National Championships, having won 33 team championships since the conference lifted its ban on NCAA play in 1994.

In the early 20th century, Middlebury's traditional athletic rivals included the University of Vermont and Norwich University. In football, Middlebury is rivals with Hamilton College; the rivalry dates to 1911 and since 1980 the game between the two schools has been called the "Rocking Chair Classic," with the Mack-Jack Rocking Chair going to the winner (Middlebury has historically dominated the rivalry).

The real-life version of Quidditch was brought to life in 2005 at Middlebury College, by Xander Manshel and Alex Benepe, who later became the first commissioner of quidditch. It has grown into a distinct sport after 15 publications of rulebooks.

== Notable people ==
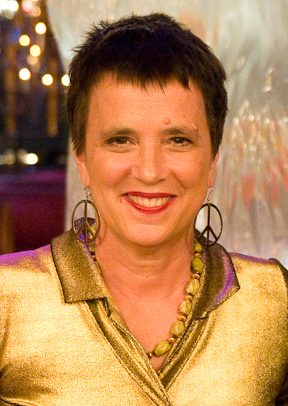
Eve Ensler
Tony Award-winning playwright, performer, creator of The Vagina Monologues
AB 1975

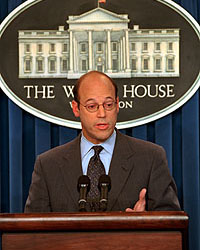
Ari Fleischer
White House Press Secretary for President George W. Bush
AB 1982

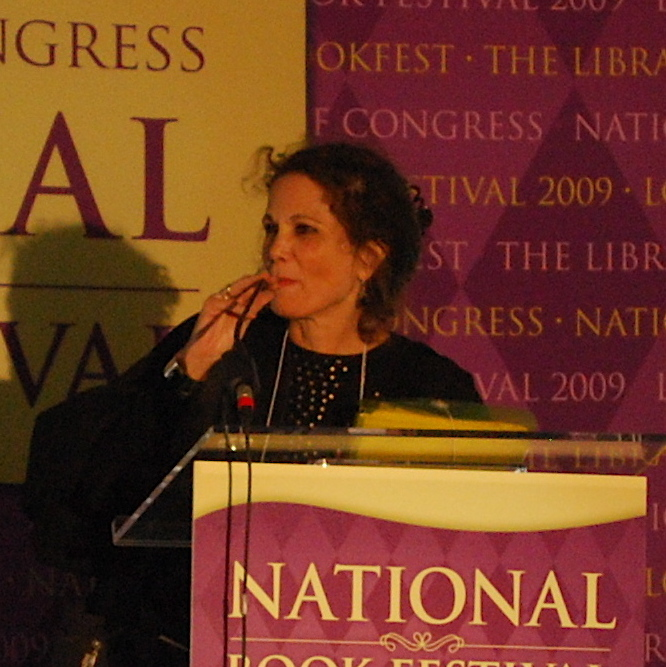
Julia Alvarez
poet, novelist, National Medal of Arts winner, author of How the García Girls Lost Their Accents
AB 1971

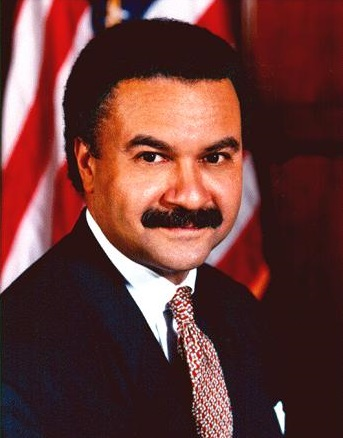
Ron Brown
Secretary of Commerce for President Clinton
AB 1962

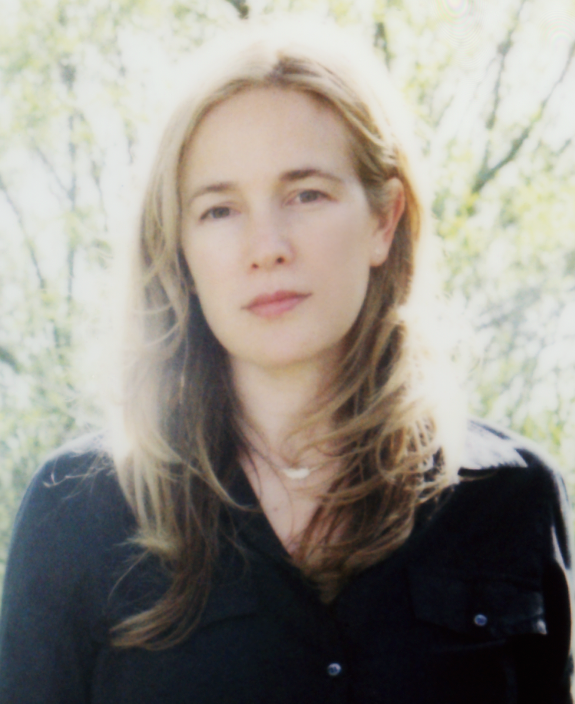
Vendela Vida
novelist
AB 1993

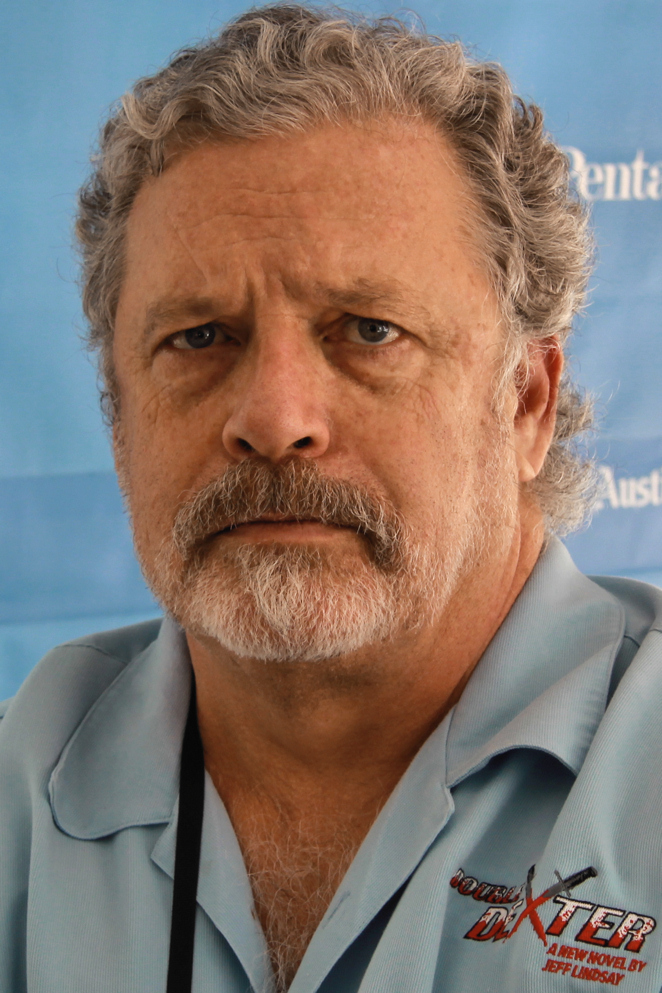
Jeff Lindsay
creator of the Dexter series
AB 1975

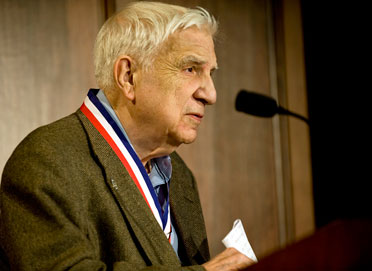
Roger Easton
principal inventor and designer of GPS
AB 1943

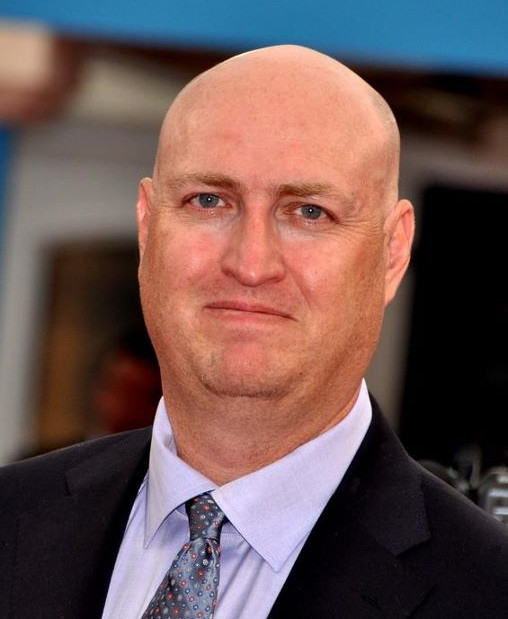
Shawn Ryan
creator of The Shield
AB 1988

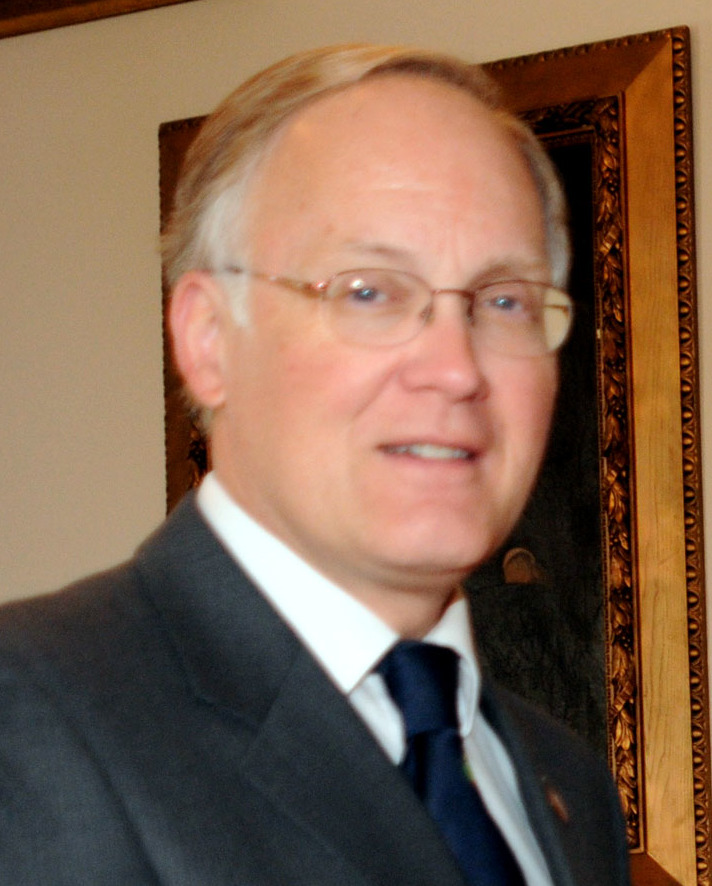
Jim Douglas
80th Governor of Vermont
AB 1972

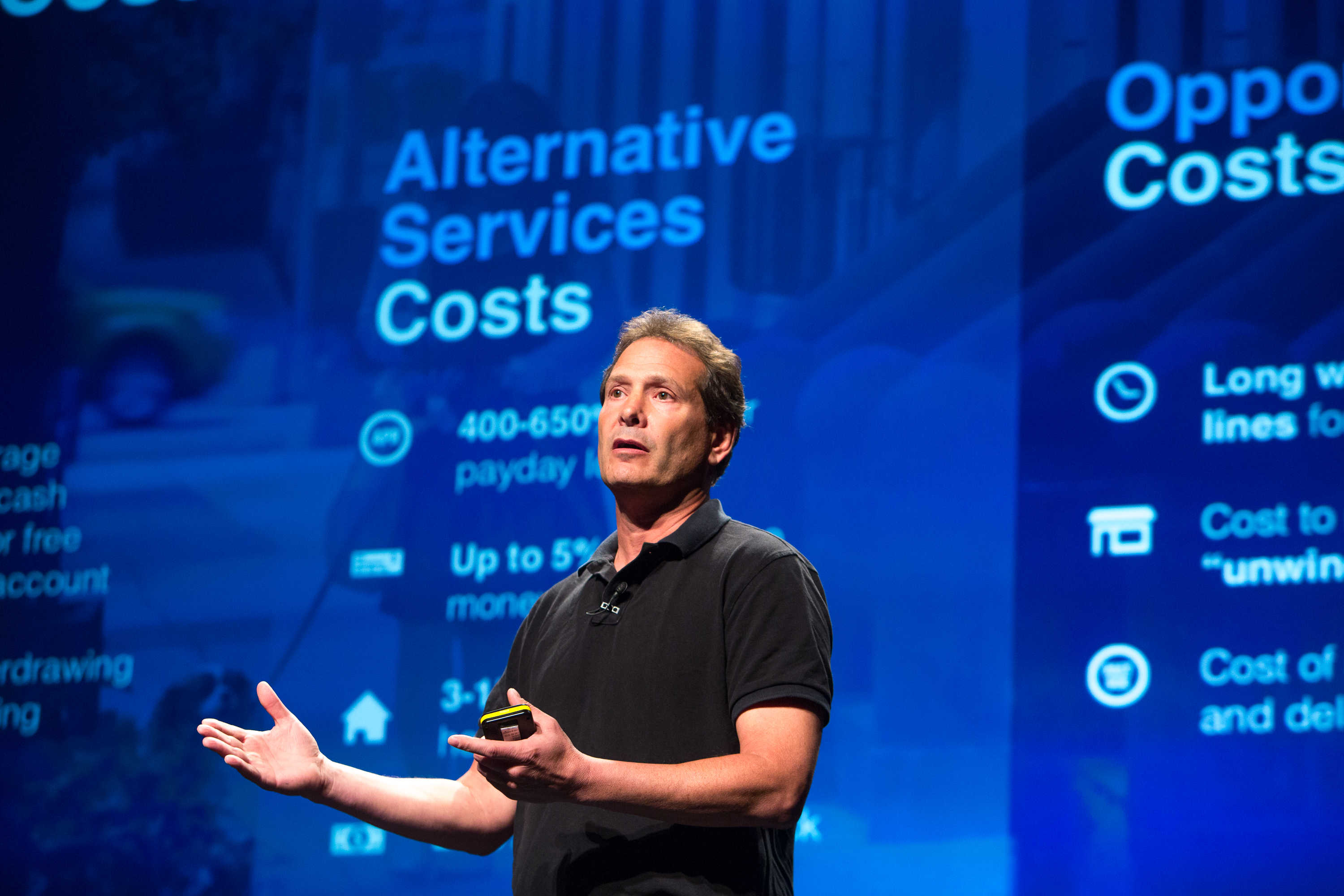
Dan Schulman
CEO of PayPal
AB 1980

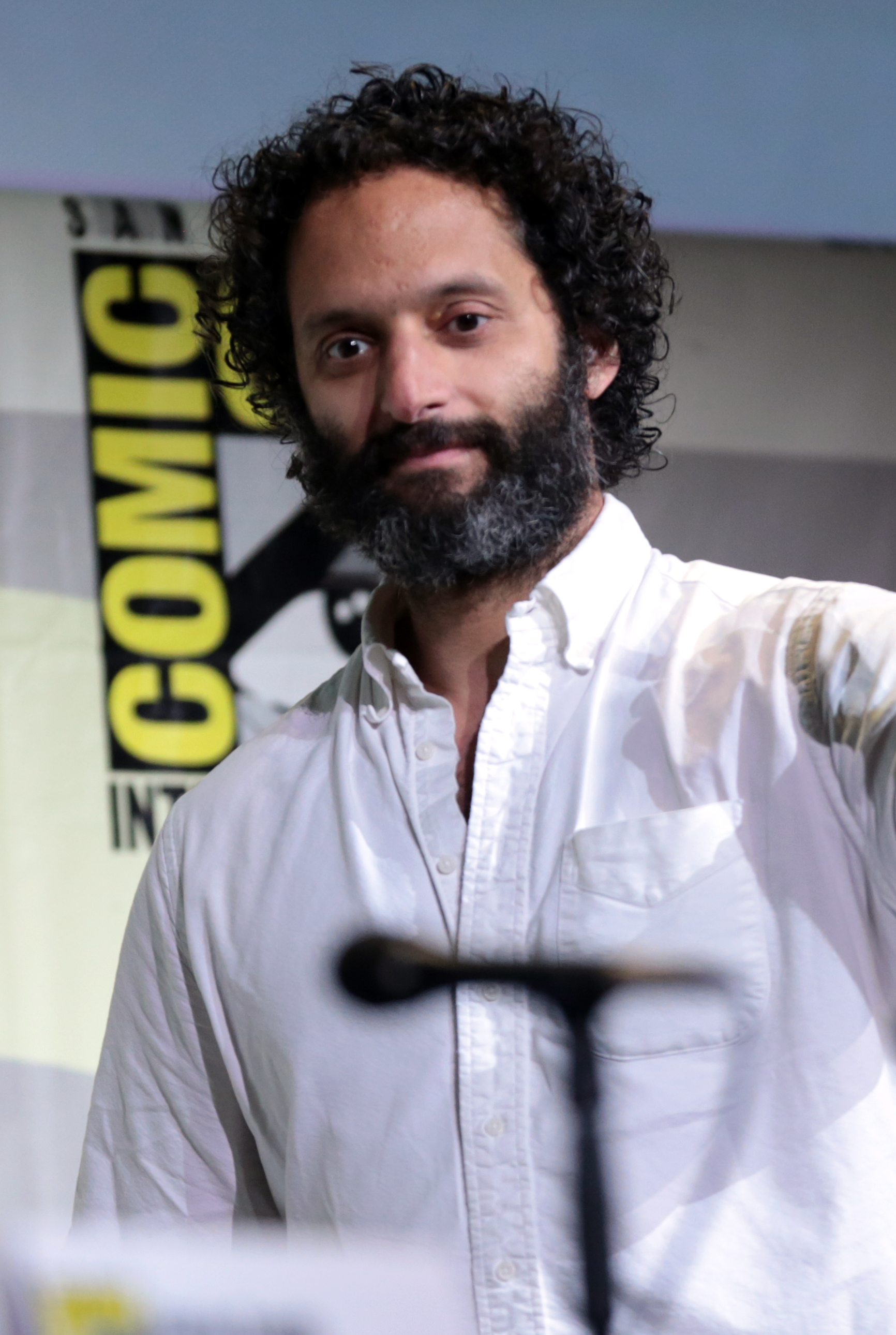
Jason Mantzoukas
comedian, writer, and actor
AB 1995

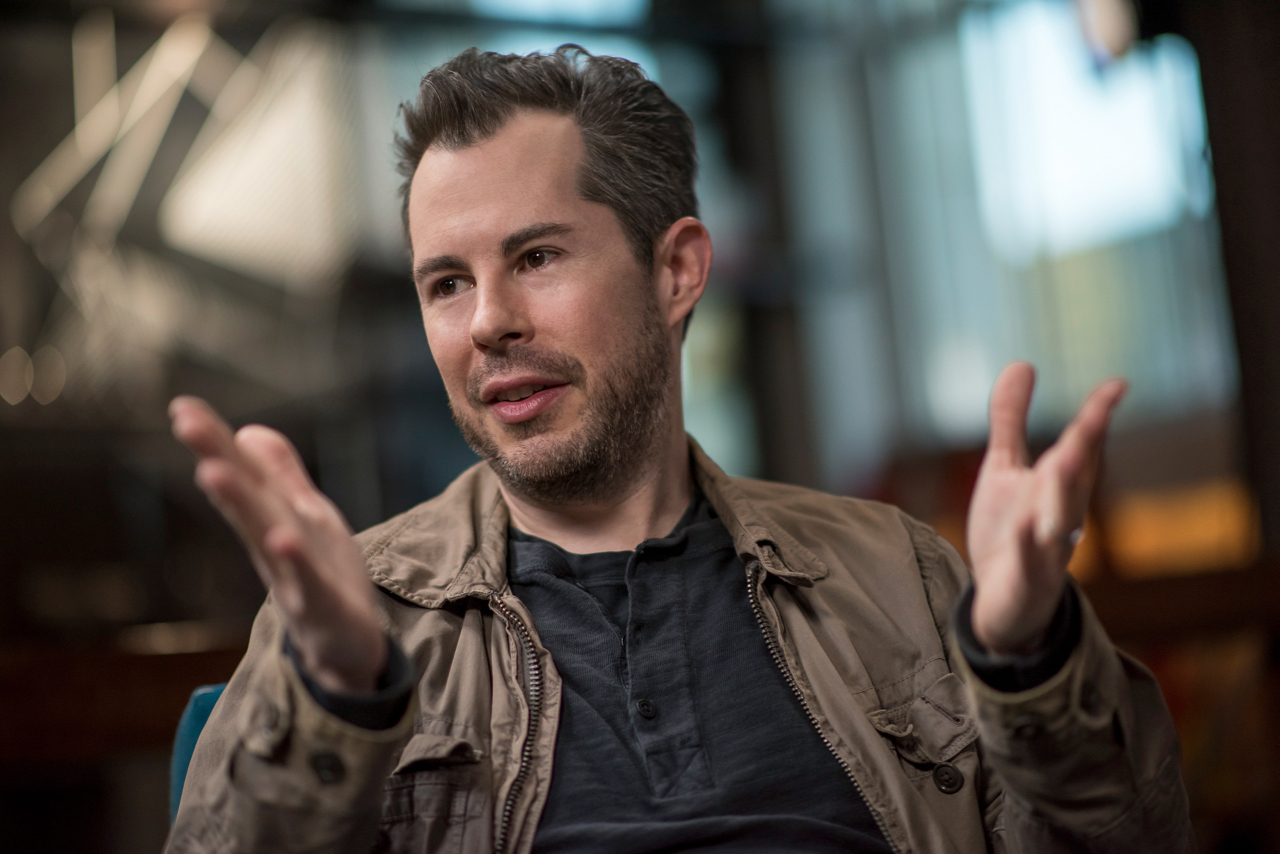
Bill Maris
founder and CEO of Google Ventures
AB 1997

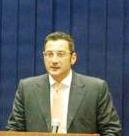
Lado Gurgenidze
6th Prime Minister of Georgia
(attended)

=== Presidents ===
1. Jeremiah Atwater, 1800–1809
2. Henry Davis, 1809–1818
3. Joshua Bates, 1818–1840
4. Benjamin Labaree, 1840–1866
5. Harvey Denison Kitchel, 1866–1875
6. Calvin Butler Hulbert, 1875–1880
7. Cyrus Hamlin, 1880–1885
8. Ezra Brainerd, 1885–1908
9. John Martin Thomas, 1908–1921
10. Paul Dwight Moody, 1921–1943
11. Samuel Somerville Stratton, 1943–1963
12. James Isbell Armstrong, 1963–1975
13. Olin Clyde Robison, 1975–1990
14. Timothy Light, 1990–1991
15. John McCardell Jr., 1991–2004
16. Ronald D. Liebowitz, 2004–2015
17. Laurie L. Patton, 2015–2024
18. Ian Baucom, 2025–present
