= Old Coaly =

Mule and university mascot (1855–1893)

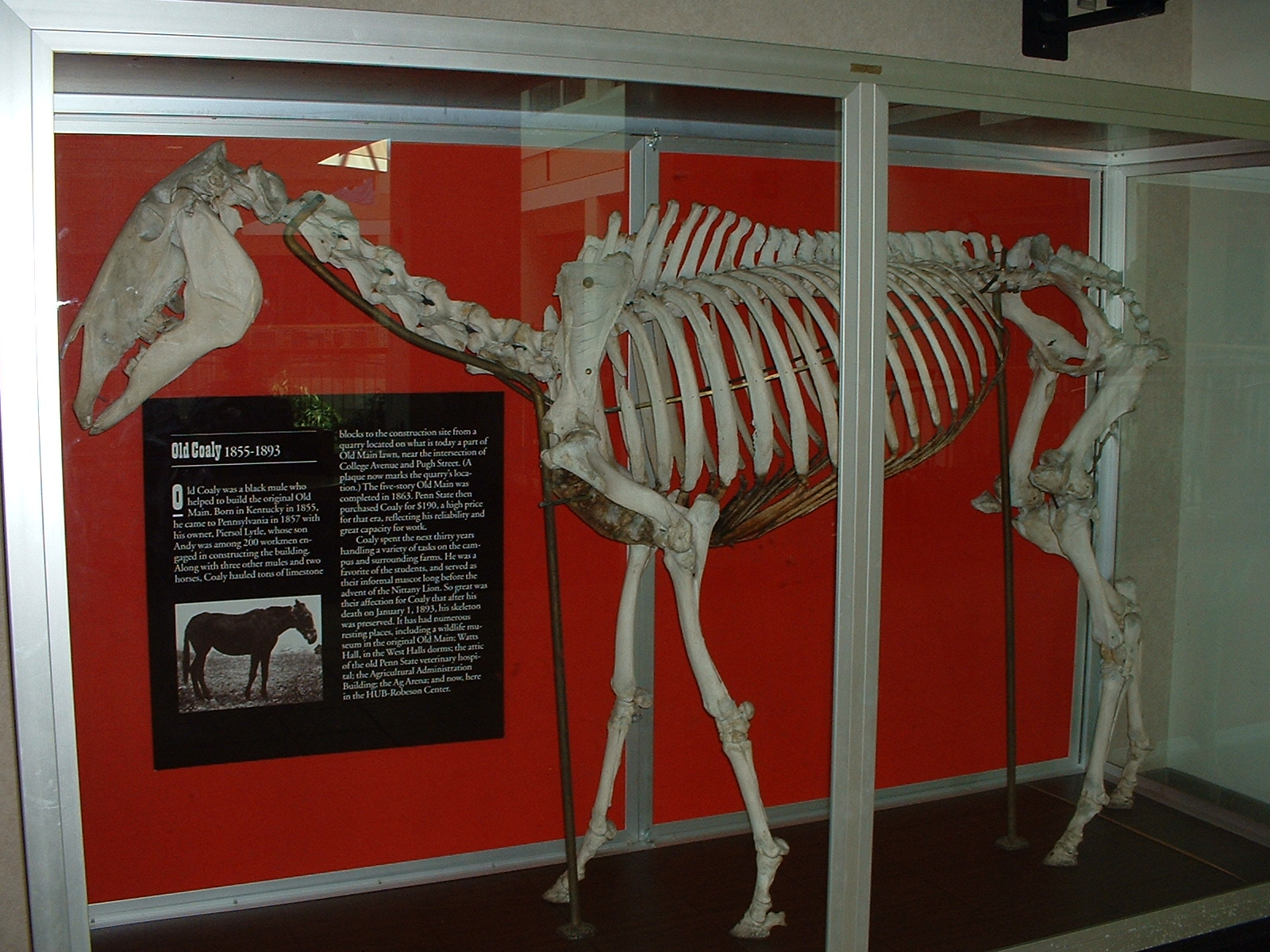
Old Coaly exhibited in the Hetzel Union Building.

Old Coaly (1855 – January 1, 1893) was a mule who helped to build the original Old Main building on the campus of the Pennsylvania State University and gained fame as an early Penn State mascot.

Born in Kentucky in 1855, Coaly came to Pennsylvania in 1857 with his owner, Piersol Lytle, whose son Andy was among the workmen hired to construct Old Main. Coaly was used primarily to haul limestone blocks to the construction site from a quarry located on what is today a part of the Old Main lawn, near the intersection of College Avenue and Pugh Street. A plaque now marks the quarry's location.

So great was their affection for Coaly that his bones were preserved and housed in various buildings throughout campus over the years. His skeleton was relocated to the first floor of the HUB–Robeson Center, to coincide with the sesquicentennial celebration of the school in 2004. Several points of interest on campus have been named in honor of Old Coaly; There was an eatery in the HUB known as "Coaly's Cafe" until renovations on the building necessitated its closing between 2001 and 2002. Penn State's new baseball stadium, Medlar Field at Lubrano Park, features a food concession called "Coaly's Corner". There is also an honorary society for College of Agricultural Sciences students at Penn State named "The Coaly Society".
