= Nitwit =

Nitwit, a colloquial noun for a stupid person, may refer to:

- an idiot
- Nittany Nation, formerly known "Nittwits", a student organization
- Dr. Nitwhite, a scientist in Between the Lions commonly called "Dr. Nitwit", much to his chagrin
- Sid Millward and His Nitwits, a British parody band between the 1930s and 1970s

== See also ==
- Baggy Pants and the Nitwits
