= Old Main (Pennsylvania State University) =

Coordinates: 40.79647°N 77.86286°W

- Old Main in 2026
- Former names: Main Building

General information
- Type: University administration, Clock Tower
- Architectural style: Federal revival
- Location: University Park, Pennsylvania
- Completed: 1863 (original structure); 1930 (current structure)
- Owner: Pennsylvania State University

Technical details
- Floor count: 4 + Clock Tower

Design and construction
- Architect: Charles Klauder

Old Main (originally called "Main Building") is The Pennsylvania State University's first building of major significance. First completed in 1863, the current incarnation of the building was completed in 1930. Today, Old Main serves as the administrative center of Penn State, housing the offices of the president and other officials. It is located in the Farmers' High School Historic District, added to the National Register of Historic Places in 1981.

== Description and history ==
The original Main Building

The original Old Main was completed in 1863 after a six-year period of construction. Hugh McAllister designed the structure to contain classrooms, laboratories, offices, a chapel, and residential space for 400 students. The limestone used to build the structure was quarried from the land directly in front of it, and was carried in part by a mule named Old Coaly, whose bones were subsequently preserved. After being deemed structurally unsound in the 1920s, the building was razed in 1929 and rebuilt in 1930. The new building, occupying the same footprint as the previous structure and incorporating some of its limestone, was christened "Old Main". The renovations cost $837,000, which was mostly paid for by state appropriations and an emergency building fund campaign.

The bell in the tower was a gift from the 1904 graduating class, and Westminster chimes were added as a gift of the 1937 class. The original chimes remained in use until the late 1970s when the university replaced them with a mix of mechanical and electronic bells. These bells eventually gave way in 1993 to the digital chimes which ring over the campus today. Between 1940 and 1949, Henry Varnum Poor utilized the fresco style to paint large murals (over 1300 ft^{2}) on the second floor of Old Main that depict Penn State's land grant history.

=== Old Coaly ===
Old Coaly was a Kentucky-born mule who was brought to Penn State in 1857 by his owner Piersol Lytle. Piersol’s son was one of 200 workmen involved with the construction of Old Main. Coaly was one of four mules and two horses that worked to haul limestone blocks out of the quarry to the construction site. He was admired so much for his reliability and toughness that Penn State purchased Old Coaly for $190.00. Over the following thirty years he was used for a variety of jobs in the surrounding area and on campus. Old Coaly was very well liked by the students and became somewhat of a mascot. When he died on January 1, 1893, his skeleton was preserved so the memories of all that he contributed could live on. Since his death, his skeleton has taken residence in many Penn State buildings, but today, Old Coaly’s skeleton is located in the HUB-Robeson Center.

=== The bell ===
The bell was cast in 1871 by William Blake and Co. in Boston, and was just recently restored by the class of 2009. The bell was removed from the Old Main tower and rung for the first time since 1929. The refurbished bell is now on display near old main and the bells heard on campus today are electrical chimes. During the week, Old Main's chimes play the Westminster Quarters, but on Fridays and Saturdays, part of a Penn State school fight song, "Hail To The Lion", is played instead. For special events the tune can vary additionally; for example, on February 22, 2005, the university's 150th anniversary, the clock tower toned "Happy Birthday to You".

=== Frescoes ===
The frescoes located on the upper walls of Old Main’s lobby were created from the ideas of professors Harold Dickson, J. Burn Helme and Francis E. Hyslop to pay a tribute to the university’s land grant education. With financial aid from the graduating class of 1932, the professors of art and architectural history hired artist Henry Varnum Poor, a well known fresco artist, to design and create the frescoes. He began sketches in 1939 and began painting in April 1940. It only took him four short months to complete his original sketches. He was rehired in 1948 to paint additional frescoes on either side of his original piece of work. The complete mural covers about 1,300 square feet (120 m^{2}).
