= Legion of Blue =

US university cheer team

- Formation: 2003
- Purpose: College basketball student section
- Headquarters: Bryce Jordan Center
- Location: University Park, Pennsylvania
- President: Kyle Kroboth
- Affiliations: Penn State Nittany Lions men's basketball
- Website: www.legionofblue.com

Legion of Blue is the student cheering section supporting the Penn State Nittany Lions basketball and Penn State Lady Lions basketball teams. The cheering section has been around as long as the Penn State basketball team, but the organization was formed in 2003 as the Nittwits before changing its name to Nittany Nation in 2007. In 2015, Nittany Nation was rebranded as Legion of Blue in an effort to better organize the group. Legion of Blue was named after the Legion of Boom, the nickname of the mid-2010s Seattle Seahawks defense that was popular during the time of the rebranding. ESPN and the Big Ten Network have featured the section during live game action.

== Organization ==
The Legion of Blue stands courtside behind the team benches, behind the basket near the Penn State bench, and behind the pep band in back of the other basket. During big games, there is student overflow seating available in the upper deck on the pep band side. The Legion of Blue supports the Nittany Lions and makes life as difficult as possible for the opposing team by standing and making noise through the entire game, making signs, and leading chants.

All Penn State students who purchase season or single game tickets are automatically members of the Legion of Blue and are eligible to sit in designated Legion of Blue seating areas and take advantage of promotions such as free food before games and t-shirt giveaways. During the final TV timeout of each game, Legion of Blue officer Ethan Cook, better known by his persona as "PSU TV Guy," hands out a free flat screen TV to the student showing the most spirit.

In the fall, season tickets are sold for $35, and individual tickets can be purchased for $5 at the Bryce Jordan Center on gamedays. For many high profile and weekend games, individual student tickets can be purchased in advance in the HUB-Robeson Center. Some students have noted that Penn State basketball season tickets pay for themselves after considering money saved from eating the Legion of Blue's free food before games.

The Legion of Blue traditionally experiences increased membership during successful seasons and the years following. The Bryce Jordan Center sold out for the first time since 2011 during a February, 2020 match vs. Minnesota, due in large part to a strong showing by the Legion of Blue. Penn State went on to win the game 83-77. Other games with high student attendance include Penn State's 2011 Senior Night vs. Ohio State and Penn State's 2020 THON Hoops game vs. Ohio State.

Some seasons, the Legion of Blue plans away game bus trips to both conference and non-conference gymnasiums. Past excursions include visits to Seton Hall, Michigan, St. Joseph's, Penn, and Virginia Tech. The Legion of Blue has brought busloads of students to Madison Square Garden several times: twice for Penn State's National Invitation Tournament (NIT) championship runs in 2009 and 2018, and also for the inaugural B1G Super Saturday in 2016.

== Executive Board ==
The Legion of Blue is run by an executive board of undergraduate students that are especially passionate about Penn State basketball. Board members help organize promotions and free food at games, interact with Penn State students and fans on social media, organize events such as the annual "Fill the Forum," and spread Penn State hoops fandom across campus. Applications for new board members open each spring following the end of the basketball season.

2022-23 Board Members
| President | Kyle Kroboth |
| Vice President | Noah Odige |
| Treasurer | Tom Perun |
| Secretary | Srikar Rao |
| Executive Officer | James Garcia |
| Executive Officer | Andrew Glenn |
| Executive Officer | Jacob Hallowell |
| Executive Officer | Amelia Houser |
| Executive Officer | Carly Knowlton |
| Executive Officer | Madi McSherry |
| Executive Officer | Luke Miller |
| Executive Officer | Laurant Morris |

Past Board Members
| Year | President | Vice President | Treasurer | Secretary | Social Media/Web | Executive Officer | Executive Officer | Executive Officer | Executive Officer | Executive Officer | Executive Officer | Executive Officer |
|---|---|---|---|---|---|---|---|---|---|---|---|---|
| 2021-22 | Jon Flatley | Garren Wolfgang | Noah Odige | Kyle Kroboth | None | Ryan Hodinko | Carly Knowlton | Olia Lantier | Madi McSherry | Tom Perun | Srikar Rao | Brayden Yoder |
| 2020-21 | Madisen Patanella | Jon Flatley | Garren Wolfgang | Ryan Hodinko | Morgan Raup | Ethan Cook | Cheyenne Johnson | Kyle Kroboth | Madi McSherry | Noah Odige | Tom Perun | |
| 2019-20 | Vinny Nardella | Liz Cooney | Alexis Soo | Madisen Patanella | None | Thomas Carvo | Jon Flatley | Ryan Hodinko | Morgan Raup | Dominico Vano | Garren Wolfgang | Kyle Yoder |
| 2018-19 | Andrew Flatley | Mercedes Fraistat | Vinny Nardella | Liz Cooney | None | Thomas Carvo | Joe Nadonley | Matt O'Connor | Madisen Patanella | Alexis Soo | Tyler Steiner | Kyle Yoder |
| 2017-18 | Nick Malizia | Andrew Flatley | Mercedes Fraistat | Liz Cooney | None | Noah Bergren | Thomas Carvo | Eric Fenstermaker | Joe Nadonley | Vinny Nardella | Tyler Steiner | Alex Trias |
| 2016-17 | Greg Zelinske | Nick Malizia | Mercedes Fraistat | Andrew Flatley | Mike Kwasnik | Patrick Burns | Liz Cooney | Shannon Jacob | Joe Nadonley | Alex Trias | Gavin Vanstone | None |
| 2015-16 | Michael "Spike" Anthony | Nick Malizia | Adriana Lacy | Steven Landman | Kristina Nauman | Andrew Flatley | Scotty Heeter | Mitchell Hutula | Joe Malespini | Matt Macnamera | Matt O'Connor | Greg Zelinske |

Legion of Blue Presidents
| 2025-26 | Will Robinson |
| 2024-25 | |
| 2023-24 | |
| 2022-23 | |
| 2021-22 | Jon Flatley |
| 2020-21 | Madisen Patanella |
| 2019-20 | Vinny Nardella |
| 2018-19 | Andrew Flatley |
| 2017-18 | Nick Malizia |
| 2016-17 | Greg Zelinske |
| 2015-16 | Michael "Spike" Anthony |
| 2014-15 | Kristina Nauman |
| 2013-14 | Darnell Brady |
| 2012-13 | Maddy Pryor |
| 2011-12 | Steve Huber |
| 2010-11 | Katie Huber |
| 2009-10 | George Beatty |
| 2008-09 | George Beatty |
| 2007-08 | Justin Casavant |
| 2006-07 | Bryan Schuster |
| 2005-06 | Jennifer Owsiany |
| 2004-05 | Jason Mattia |
| 2003-04 | Justin Casavant |

== Charity ==
Legion of Blue helps organize events with the university's athletic department and the basketball team to benefit Penn State THON, a dance marathon dedicated to curing childhood cancer. Each year, the Legion of Blue helps host the THON Hoops game, where all revenue from single game student tickets in donated to THON under the name of the organization of the student's choice. Students also receive colorful shirts worn to generate awareness. THON children and their families are seated in the typical section section behind the basket near the Penn State bench and are recognized throughout the game.

== Recognition ==
Legion of Blue and its members have been recognized by a variety of sources for their school spirit and charitable work. During the 2017-18 school year, Legion of Blue won the Lion Light student organization of the month award for their September "Fill the Forum" event and the Penn State student organization of the month for their contributions to the annual THON Hoops game. Legion of Blue was featured in conjunction with Penn State THON as part of ESPN's Student Spirit Week for the Nittany Lions' 2008 matchup against Ohio State, and 2005-06 president Jennifer Owsiany was named ESPN's 2006 "Miss Bracket" after an online poll of college basketball's biggest superfans.
