= Medlar Field =

Baseball stadium in University Park, Pennsylvania, US

Medlar Field at Lubrano Park
- The Med

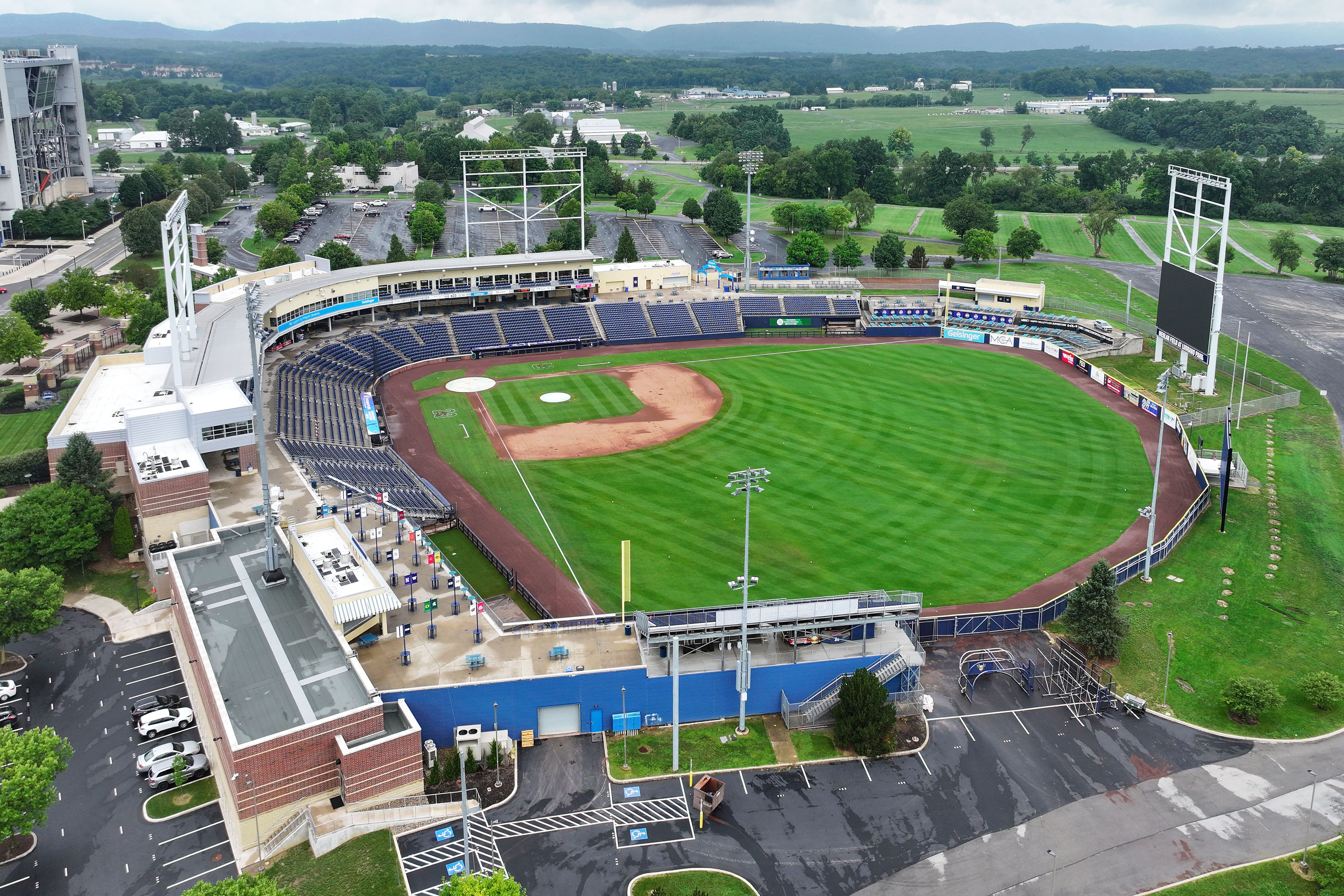
- Medlar Field at Lubrano Park in 2026.
- Interactive map of Medlar Field at Lubrano Park
- Location: 112 Medlar Field at Lubrano Park; University Park, State College, Pennsylvania 16802
- Coordinates: 40°48′43″N 77°51′3″W
- Owner: Pennsylvania State University
- Operator: State College Baseball LP
- Capacity: 5,570
- Surface: Kentucky bluegrass
- Field size: Left Field: 325 ft (99.06 m); Left Center Field: 410 ft (124.968 m); Center Field: 399 ft (121.615 m); Right Center Field: 378 ft (115.2 m); Right Field: 320 ft (97.536 m)

Construction
- Groundbreaking: May 18, 2005
- Opened: June 1, 2006
- Cost: US$31.4 million ($50.1 million in 2025 dollars)
- Architects: DLR Group; L. Robert Kimball and Associates
- General contractor: Barton Malow

Tenants
- State College Spikes (NYPL/MLBDL) (2006–present); Penn State Nittany Lions baseball (NCAA) (2007–present)

Medlar Field at Lubrano Park is a 5,570-seat baseball stadium in University Park, Pennsylvania, that hosted its first regular season baseball game on June 20, 2006, when the State College Spikes lost to the Williamsport Crosscutters, 5–3. The Penn State Nittany Lions college baseball team began play at the ballpark in 2007.

Seating capacity is 5,570 people. Events other than baseball games are held at the ballpark, and different seating configurations are available.

This stadium was designed to feature an unobstructed view of Penn State landmark Mount Nittany over the outfield wall.

== History ==
Penn State alumnus Anthony Lubrano first suggested upgrading Penn State baseball facilities to representatives of the university in 1995. After receiving a donation from Lubrano in 2002, the Penn State Board of Trustees voted to name the new stadium Medlar Field at Lubrano Park. In 2003, representatives of the Altoona Curve management group approached Penn State with the idea of sharing a ballpark that both the Altoona Curve and the Penn State baseball team would use as a home field.

Final plans for the new ballpark were approved by the Penn State Board of Trustees on May 13, 2005. Ground was broken for the new ballpark on May 18, 2005. Among the dignitaries on hand for the groundbreaking ceremony were Pennsylvania governor Ed Rendell, Penn State president Graham Spanier, state Senator Jake Corman and Penn State Athletic Director Tim Curley.

The ballpark was named a 2006 Project of the Year in the area of sports by Mid-Atlantic Construction.

== Naming ==
Medlar Field at Lubrano Park is named for two Penn State alumni, Charles Medlar and Anthony Lubrano. Coach Charles "Chuck" Medlar (1918–1999) was an athletic trainer at Penn State for 35 years, and the head Penn State baseball coach from 1963 to 1981. The Charles Medlar Award is given annually in his honor to the outstanding pitcher of the Penn State baseball team.

Anthony Lubrano is a 1982 alumnus of the Penn State Smeal College of Business. Since graduation, Lubrano has established a successful financial services company. His donation pledge of $2.5 million towards this project made him the lead benefactor, and Lubrano received from Penn State the opportunity to name this venue. Lubrano chose to name this venue Medlar Field at Lubrano Park in recognition of Coach Medlar's contributions to Penn State athletics.

== Features ==
The "footprint" of the stadium (outfield dimensions, foul ground, etc.) is identical to PNC Park in Pittsburgh (home of the MLB's Pittsburgh Pirates) except for the right field wall. At PNC Park, the wall is 21 feet tall, but at Medlar Field, it is 18.55 feet tall to commemorate the year that Penn State was founded. The physical plant of this venue includes the stadium, parking areas, and a pedestrian plaza. The stadium has three levels, Field (clubhouse) Level, Concourse Level, and Luxury Suite Level. The street level entrance to the stadium is on the Concourse Level.

=== Photos of the ballpark ===
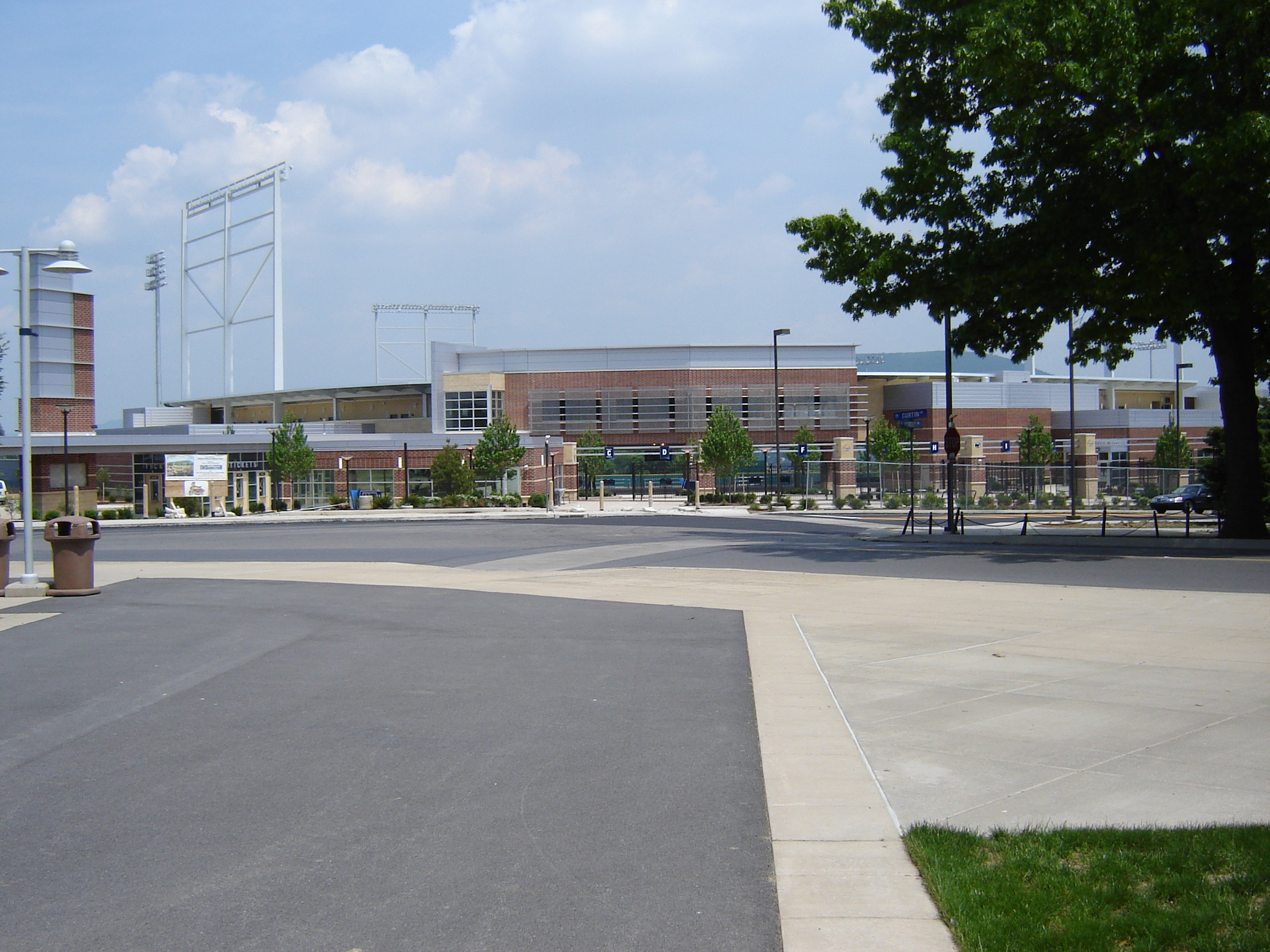
The ballpark shortly before opening in 2006.

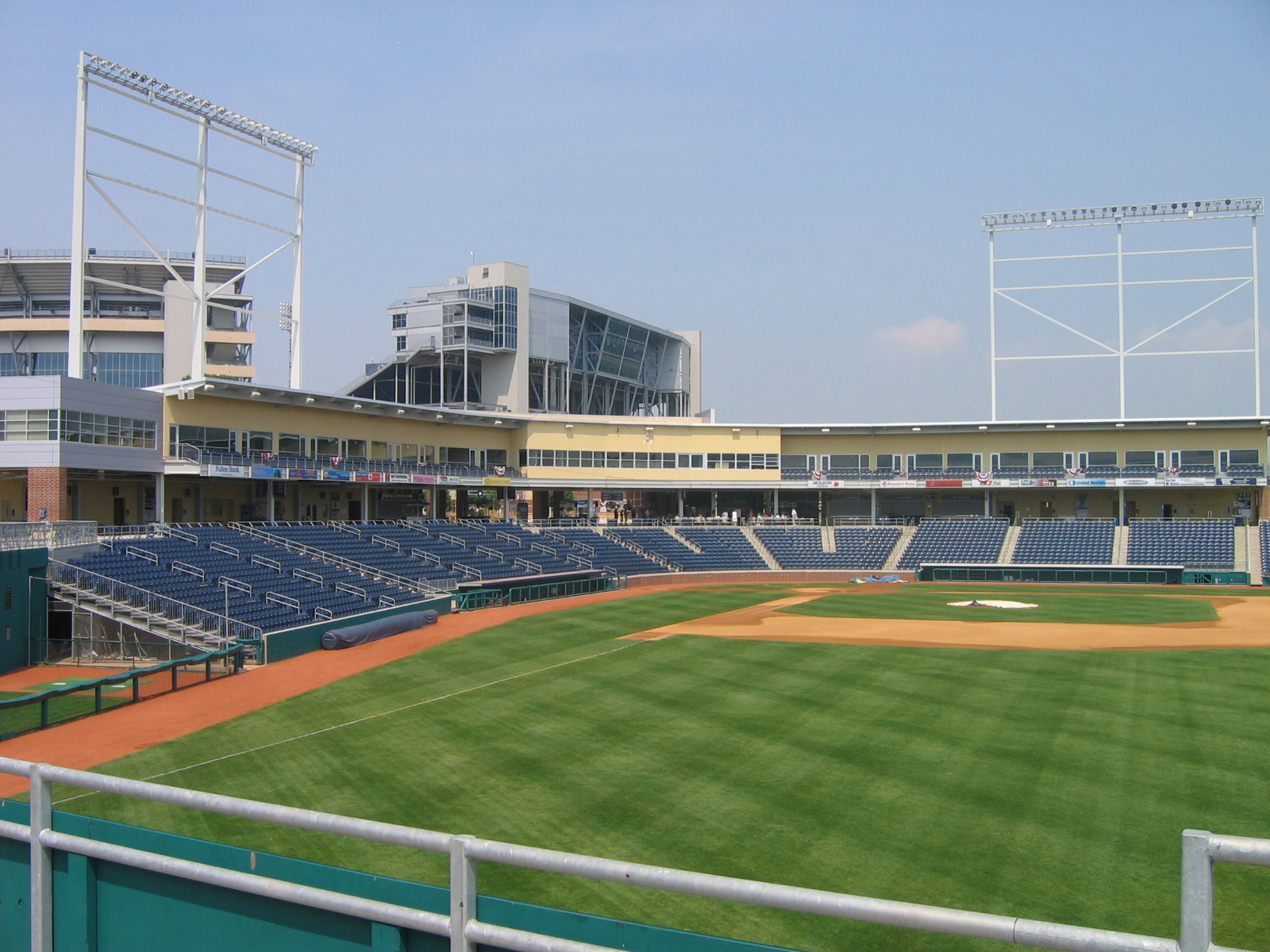
Park's infield

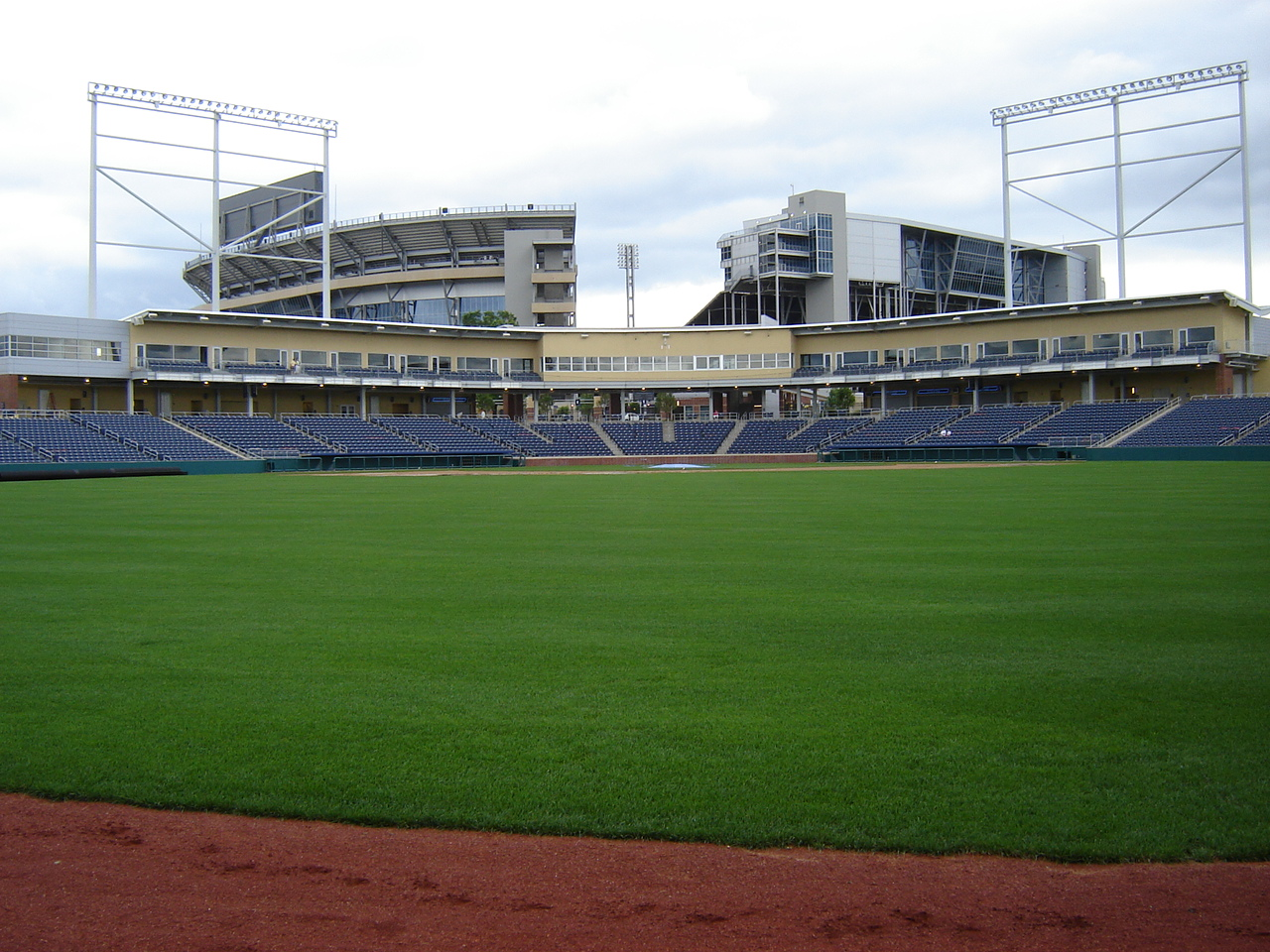
A view of the grandstand.

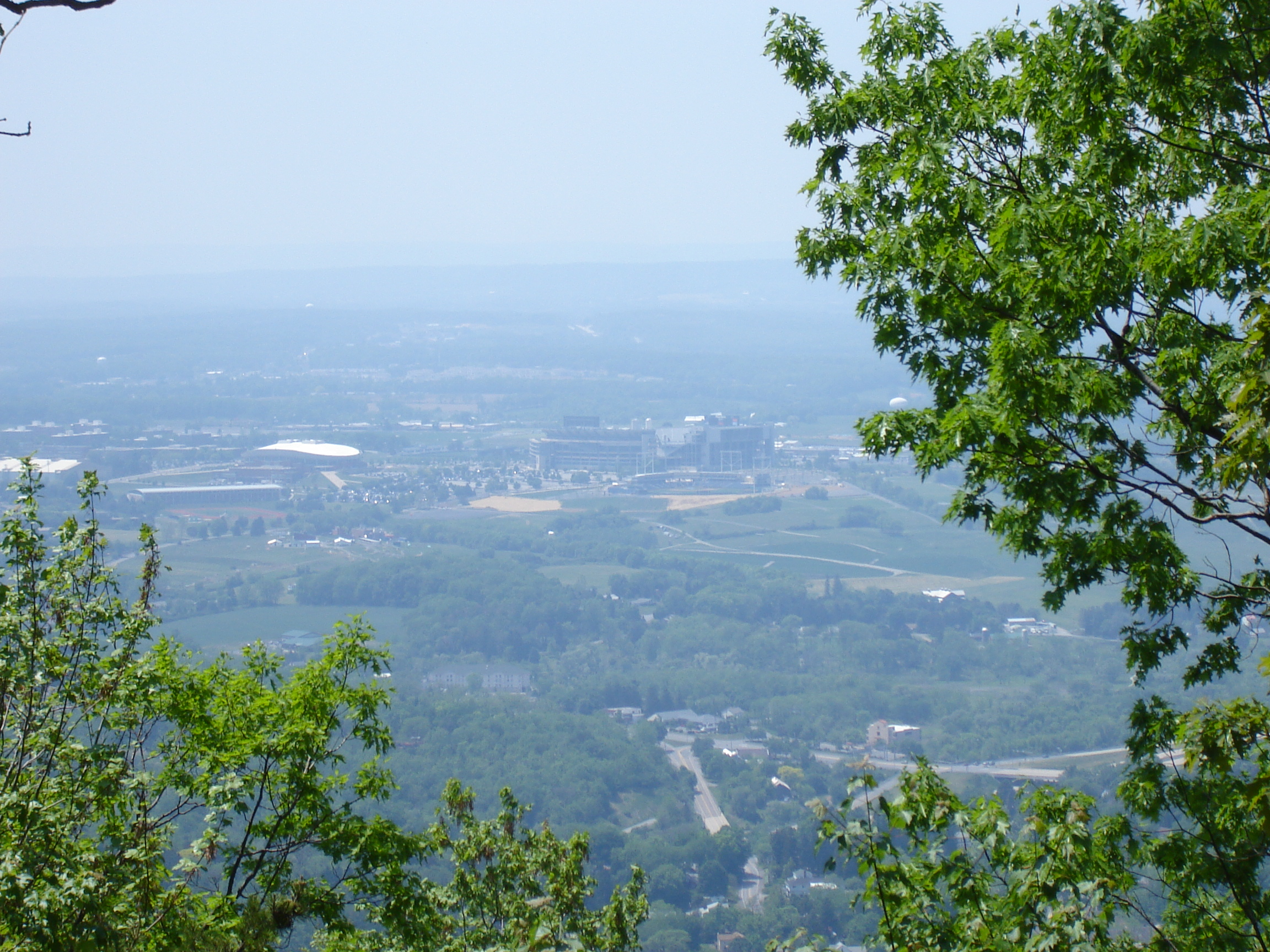
The park as seen from Mount Nittany.

=== Field level ===
There are three clubhouses in this stadium, one for the Nittany Lions, one for the State College Spikes, and one for the visiting team. Home team facilities include a weight room and training area for each team, an indoor batting cage, storage areas, and a laundry room. Entrance into the dugouts and onto the playing field for players is from this level.

=== Concourse level ===
This level includes a first aid station, a baseball–themed store called Off The Rack Outfitters, a customer service center, and restrooms. The State College Spikes offices are also located on this level.

Amenities on the right field side of this level include the Outfield Bleachers seating area, and the Rail Kings seating area located on the Nittany Embroidery Fun Deck. The food concessions in this area include The Right Field Grill, Coaly's Corner, and The Batter's Eye.

Amenities on the left field side of this level include the Left Field Picnic and a play area for children called the S&A Homes Kids Zone. The food concession stands in this area are The Left Field Grill, The "Grand" Stand, and The Bullpen Café.

Food including Philly cheesesteaks, hot dogs, and ice cream will be sold by the concessions. Beer is sold during both Spikes and Penn State games. Along with the Penn Stater Conference Center and The Nittany Lion Inn, this venue is one of only three Penn State facilities on the University Park campus where alcohol is allowed to be sold.

Wheelchair–accessible seating is located on the concourse behind the Bullpen Box, Field Box, and Diamond Club seating areas. There is a wheelchair lift located in the left field picnic area, connecting the Concourse Level with the Field Level. An elevator also connects all three levels of the stadium, making all areas accessible.

=== Luxury suite level ===
The 20 luxury suites and the press box are located on this level. 18 luxury suites are designed to accommodate 20 people each, and two larger suites are designed to accommodate 40 people each. The Press Box consists of three broadcast booths for television and radio media. The Penn State Sports Journalism Center and the Penn State Baseball offices are also located on this level.

=== Parking ===
Two parking lots with a total of 502 parking spaces were built as part of this venue. The Porter North lot has 385 parking spaces and the Porter South Lot has 117. Improvements were also made to Parking Lot 44, which this venue shares with Beaver Stadium and the Bryce Jordan Center.

=== Accessibility ===
This venue is accessible by foot, bicycle, public transportation, car, and by air travel. As part of this venue's construction, a landscaped pedestrian plaza called Porter Gardens was built along Porter Road, bicycle racks were installed, and a Centre Area Transportation Authority (CATA) bus stop and drop–off zone was added for the Route H and Route P buses. Nearby highways include Pennsylvania Route 26, Interstate 99/U.S. Route 220, U.S. Route 322, and Interstate 80. University Park Airport is located approximately four miles (6.4 km) from the ballpark, and provides air travel connections to several cities.

== See also ==
- List of NCAA Division I baseball venues
- Pennsylvania State University
