= Farmers' High School =

- U.S. National Register of Historic Places
- U.S. Historic district
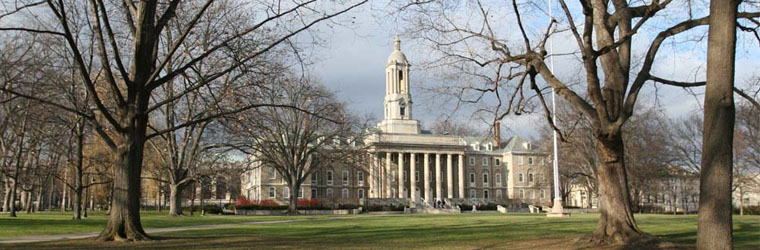
- Old Main

- Location within Pennsylvania Location within the United States
- Location: College Ave. and Atherton St., State College, Pennsylvania
- Coordinates: 40°47′47″N 77°51′46″W
- Area: 82 acres (33 ha)
- Built: 1855
- Architect: Multiple
- Architectural style: Classical Revival, Colonial Revival, Other, Georgian Revival
- NRHP reference No.: 81000538
- Added to NRHP: September 11, 1981

Farmers' High School is a national historic district located on the campus of the Pennsylvania State University in University Park / State College, Centre County, Pennsylvania. The district includes 37 contributing buildings and 1 contributing object in the Old Campus area of Penn State. The district includes Old Main (1930), the Faculty Club (1976), Nittany Lion Inn (1930), Recreation Hall (1928), West Halls Complex (1922-1937), University Club (1916), the President's Mansion (1864, 1940), Pattee Library (1938), Schwab Auditorium (1902), and a number of fraternities, sororities, and classroom buildings. The buildings reflect a number of popular early-20th-century architectural styles including Colonial Revival, Classical Revival, and Georgian Revival. A focal point of the district is the Nittany Lion Shrine (1942).

It was added to the National Register of Historic Places in 1981.

== Gallery ==
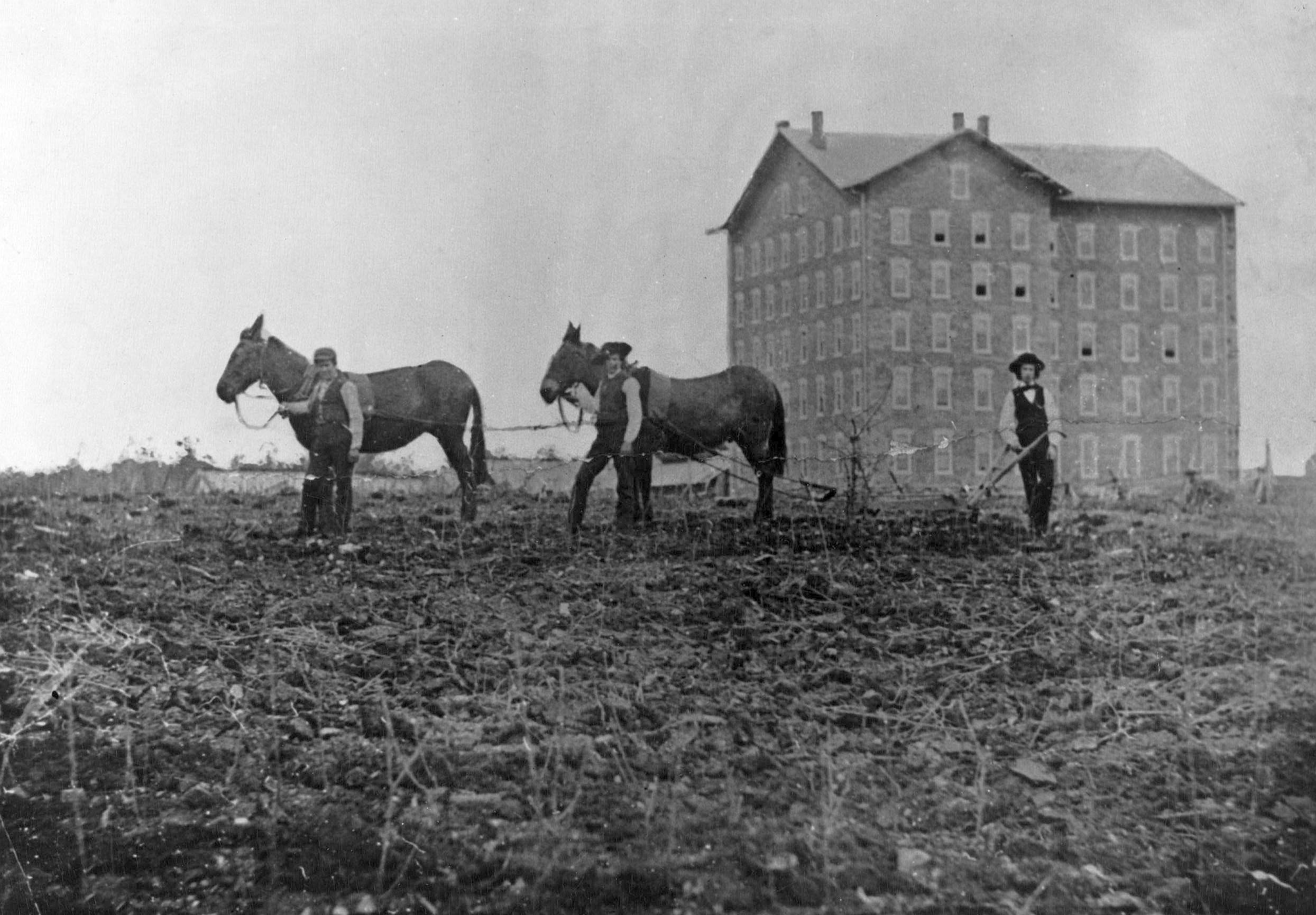
Old Main c. 1855

Former President's house.

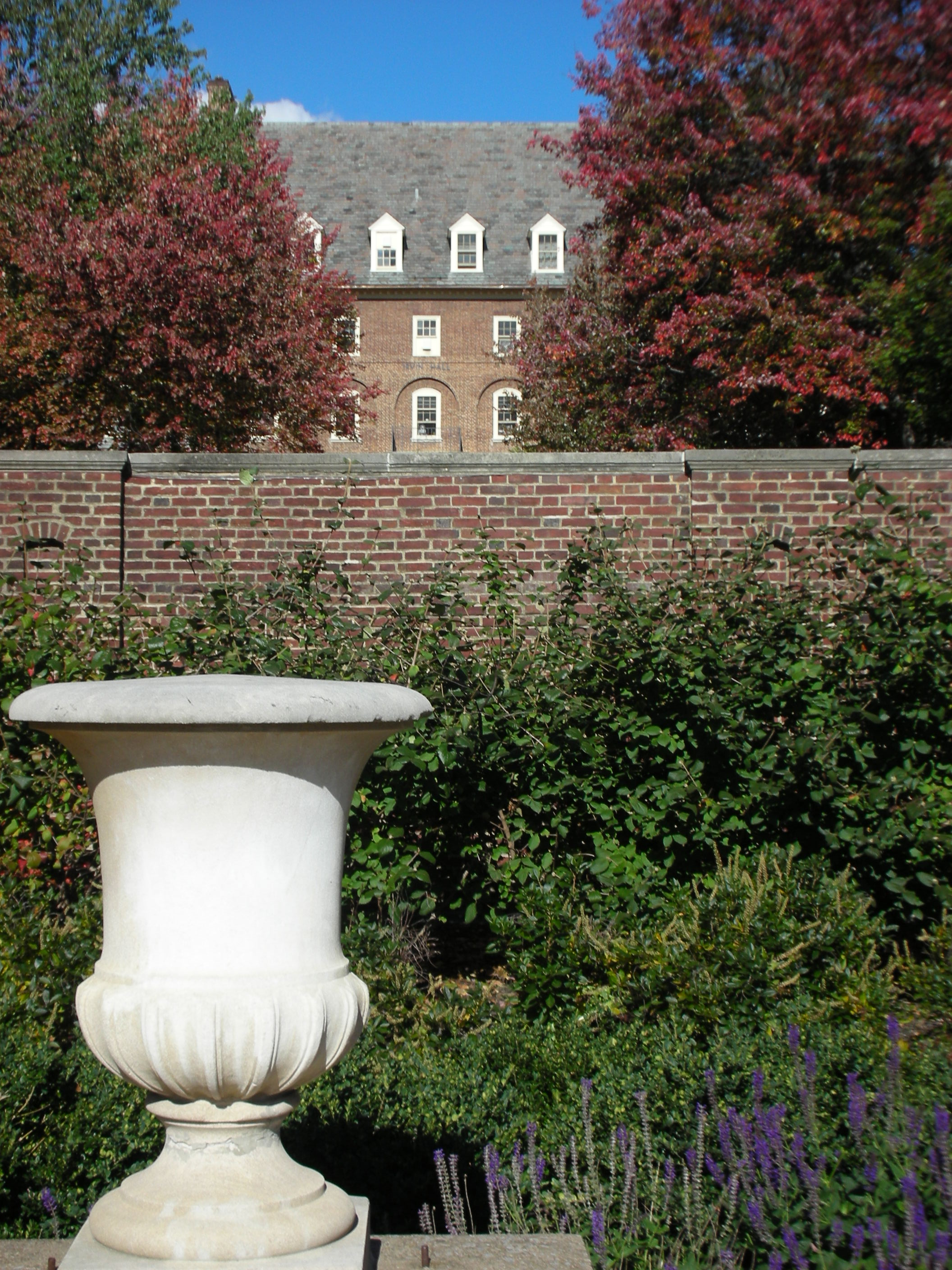
Irvin residence hall in West Halls.

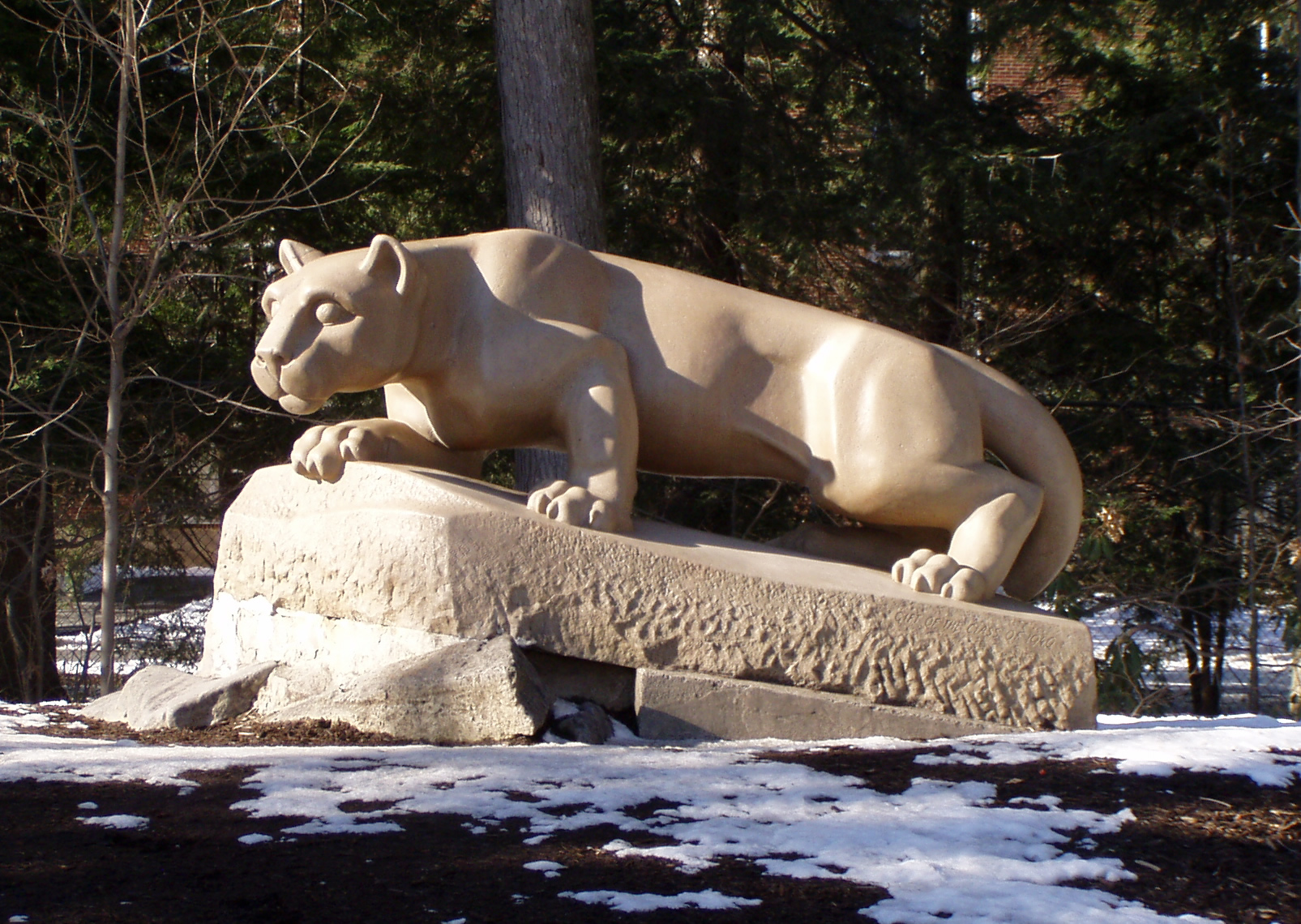
The Lion Shrine at Penn State.

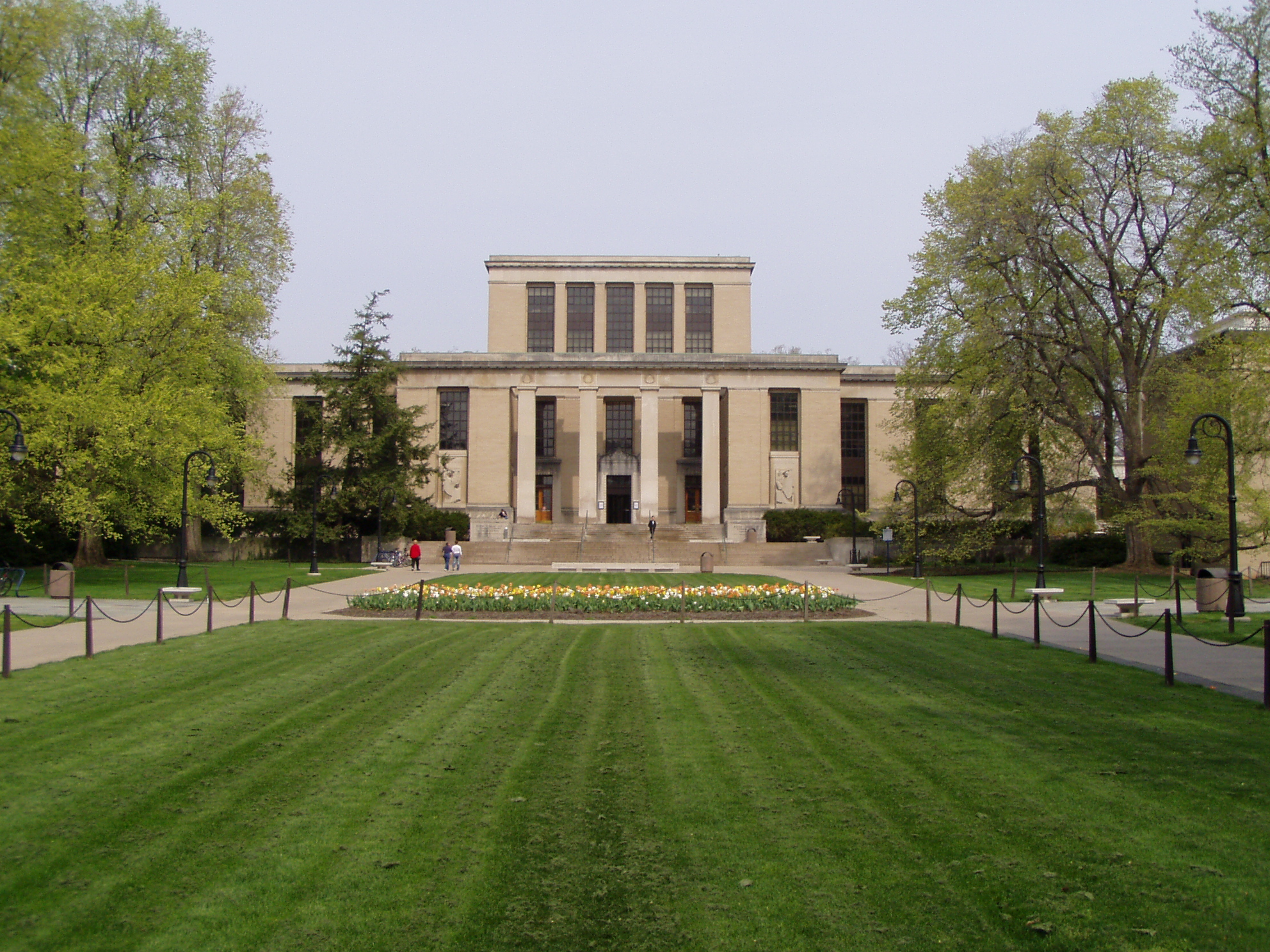
Pattee Library and mall at Penn State.
