= Bryce Jordan Center =

Arena in State College, Pennsylvania

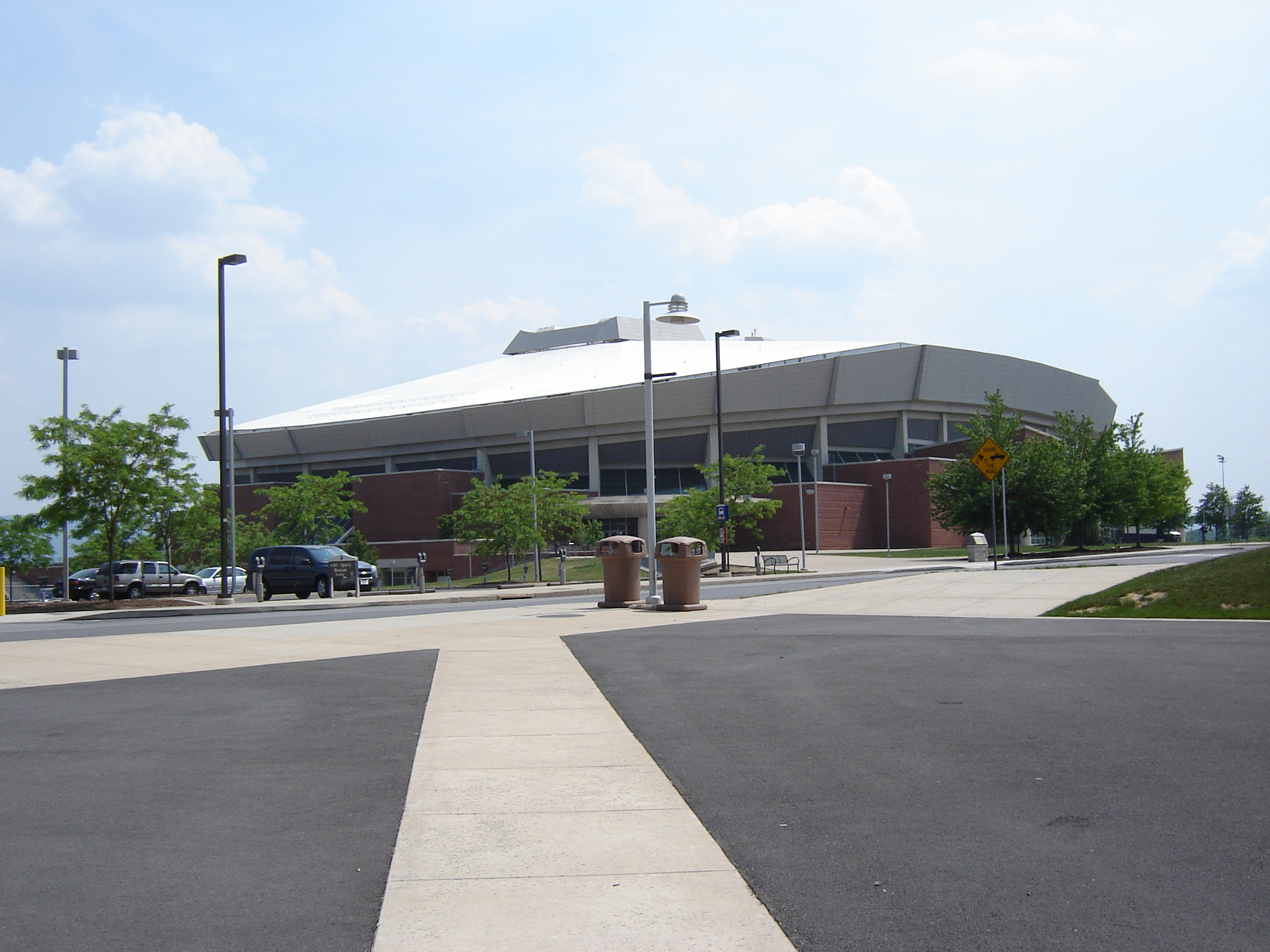
- Bryce Jordan Center in May 2006
- Interactive map of Bryce Jordan Center
- Location: 127 Bryce Jordan Center; State College, Pennsylvania 16802
- Coordinates: 40°48′32″N 77°51′21″W
- Owner: Pennsylvania State University
- Operator: Pennsylvania State University
- Capacity: Basketball: 15,261; Concerts: 16,000+
- Surface: Multi-surface

Construction
- Groundbreaking: April 7, 1993
- Opened: January 6, 1996
- Cost: $52.762 million ($108 million in 2025 dollars)
- Architect: Rosser International Inc.
- General contractor: Gilbane Building Company

Tenants
- Penn State Nittany Lions (NCAA); Men's basketball (1996–present); Women's basketball (1996–present)

The Bryce Jordan Center is a 15,261-seat multi-purpose arena in College Township, Pennsylvania, on the University Park campus of the Pennsylvania State University. The arena opened on January 6, 1996, and is the largest such indoor venue in Pennsylvania outside of those in Philadelphia and Pittsburgh. The arena replaced Rec Hall as the home to the Nittany Lions men's and women's basketball and the Pride of the Lions Pep Band and its student section, known as Legion of Blue. The arena also periodically hosts concerts, circuses, and commencement ceremonies for the university.

The arena is named after Bryce Jordan, Penn State University's president from 1983 until 1990 who was instrumental in acquiring funding needed to build it. The arena is associated with the Arena Network, a marketing and scheduling group of 38 arenas.

== Location and layout ==
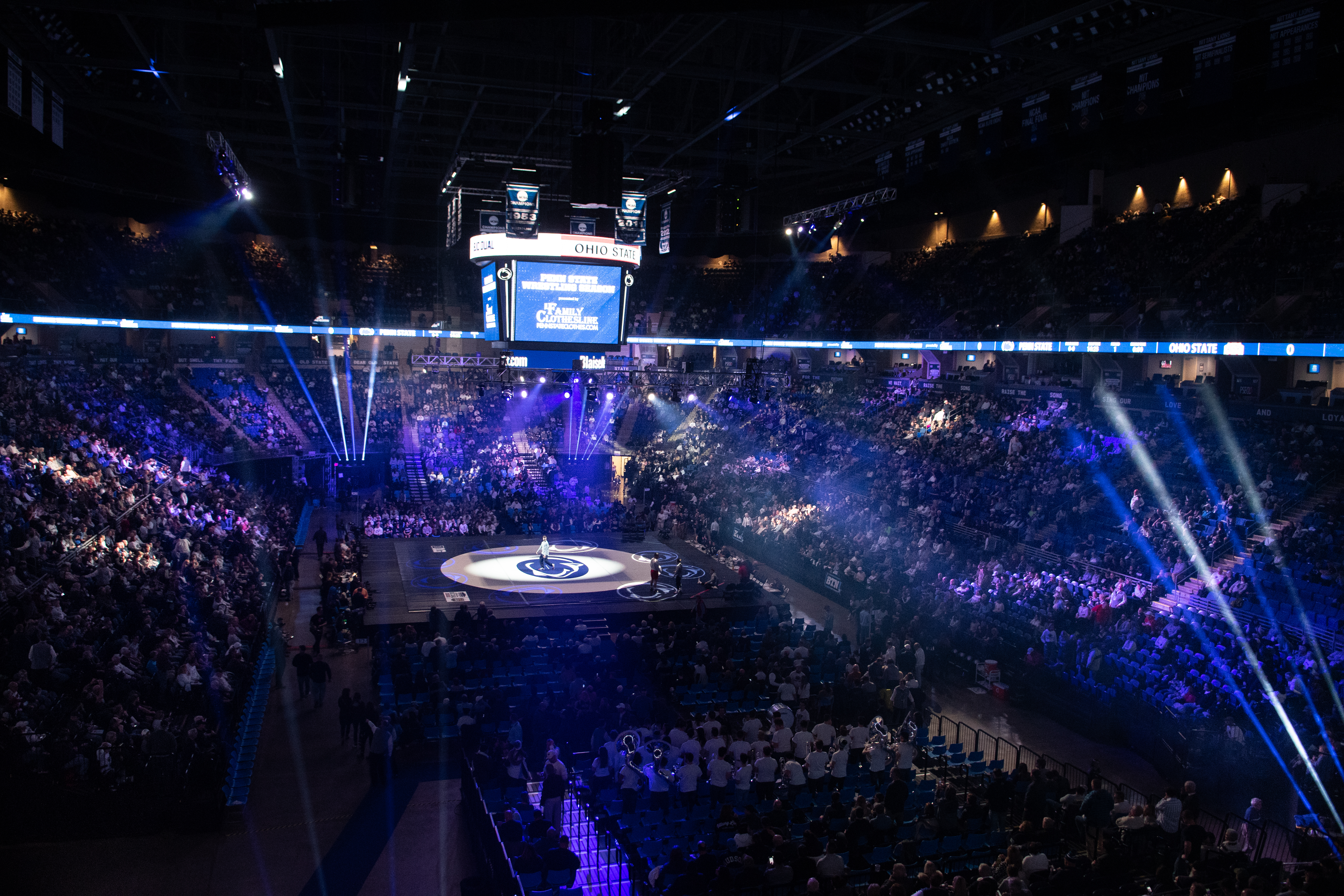
Bryce Jordan Center during a Penn State wrestling match against Ohio State in February 2020

The arena is located across the street from Beaver Stadium on Curtin Road, on the eastern part of the campus. This part of campus is home to many of the school's athletic facilities, including the recently built Medlar Field at Lubrano Park baseball facility, Pegula Ice Arena, and Jeffrey Field soccer stadium. There is a large electronic display outside the arena which provides advertisements for future events. The university also recently contracted with ANC Sports to install over 900 feet (270 m) of LED ribbon board signage to be used for sponsor advertisements and game prompts.

== Notable events ==
- The arena hosts numerous concerts and World Wrestling Entertainment events, including RAW.
- In 1998, parts of Aerosmith's live album, A Little South of Sanity, were recorded at the Jordan Center. Lead singer Steven Tyler can be heard yelling "State College" out to the audience during "Love in an Elevator".
- In 2000, the music video for Backstreet Boys' song "The One" was filmed at the arena
- In 2001, Britney Spears played at the arena as part of her Dream Within a Dream Tour. Some performances were taped with a new technology, at the time, called First-person shooter engine and were released as bonus videos in her video game "Britney's Dance Beat", for PlayStation 2.
- On October 1, 2004, during the 2004 presidential campaign, the arena hosted the politically motivated Vote for Change Tour, featuring performances by My Morning Jacket, Jurassic 5, Ben Harper & The Innocent Criminals, and Dave Matthews Band.
- In March 2006, the arena hosted first and second rounds of the NCAA Women's Division I Basketball Championship. The arena also hosts the Pennsylvania Interscholastic Athletic Association (PIAA) Basketball Championships annually.
- In 2007, the Penn State IFC/Panhellenic Dance Marathon, commonly known as THON, was moved to the Jordan Center. The event, designed to raise money to fight pediatric cancer, raises millions of dollars every year.
- On October 13, 2008, it hosted Change Rocks: A Concert to Benefit Obama, featuring The Allman Brothers Band and four living members of Grateful Dead, Bob Weir, Phil Lesh, Mickey Hart, and Bill Kreutzmann.
- On October 20, 2018, a Metallica concert set the attendance record for the arena with 15,588 people.
- On January 27, 2023, the arena hosted 15,998 fans for the Penn State Nittany Lions wrestling match against Iowa, tying the record for the third-largest dual meet crowd in collegiate wrestling history and exceeding attendance for the Metallica concert in 2018, setting an all-time attendance record for the arena.
- On October 25, 2025, Real American Freestyle presented RAF 02 from the arena, an event that was broadcast live on Fox Nation.

== See also ==
- List of indoor arenas in the United States
- List of NCAA Division I basketball arenas
