= HUB-Robeson Center =

Student union building at Penn State

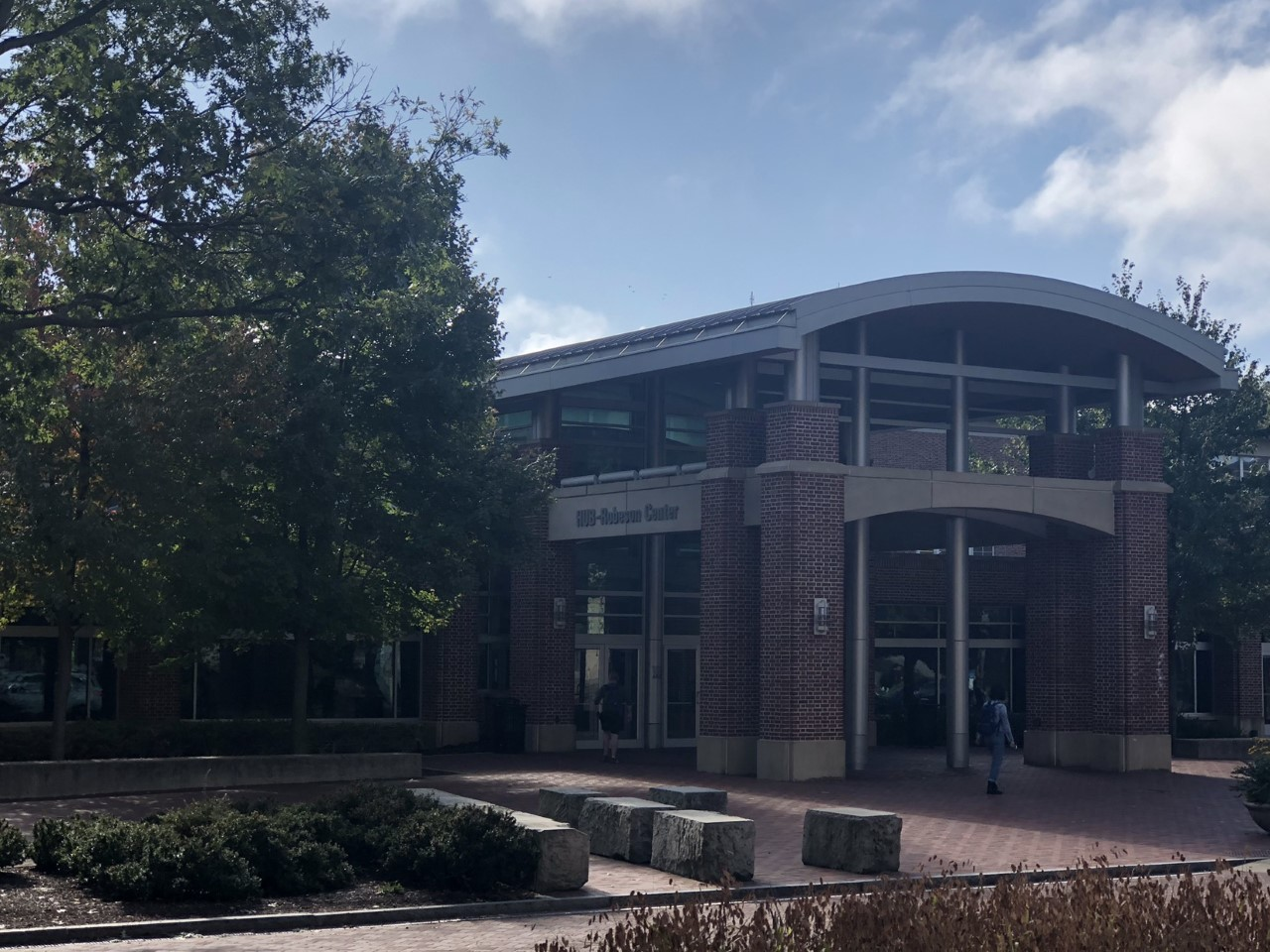
HUB-Robenson Center at Pennsylvania State University.

The HUB-Robeson Center is the student union building, centrally located on Penn State's main campus in University Park, Pennsylvania.

== History ==
This building was originally constructed in 1953 and has undergone major renovations in 1973 and 1983. Along with these renovations, a 91,000 square foot addition was added to the existing building in 1997. Most recently, in 2015, an additional 50,000 usable square feet was created as part of a facade construction project. The original, 1953 iteration of the building was named the Hetzel Union Building, or HUB, after Penn State president Ralph D. Hetzel, who served as the 10th president of Penn State University from 1927 to 1947.

Prior to 1999, the Robeson Center resided in the Walnut Building on Penn State's campus. The Robeson Center was originally referred to as Penn State's Black Cultural Center, but was renamed after Paul Robeson in 1986 for his contributions to the civil rights movement in the 20th century. In 1999, the Robeson Center moved from the Walnut building to the newly renovated HUB, which was then renamed the Hetzel Union Building-Robeson Center (HUB-Robeson Center).

As the HUB-Robeson Center is the campus's student union, it provides a variety of services, retail spaces and dining options to students, faculty, staff, and visitors of Penn State University.

=== 1996 shooting ===
In 1996, a nearby resident named Jillian Robbins, opened fire on the lawn in front of the building. The 19-year-old shooter killed one student named Melanie Spalla, 19, and injured another during her unprovoked attack. She was ultimately stopped after being tackled while trying to load her second clip into her Mauser rifle by aerospace engineering student Brendon Malovrh.
