= Robert Kinney =

Robert Kinney may refer to:

- Robert Crouch Kinney (1813–1875), American businessman and politician in what became the state of Oregon
- E. Robert Kinney (1917–2013), CEO of General Mills
- Bob Kinney (1920–1985), American professional basketball player
