= Bates College =

Private liberal arts college in Lewiston, Maine, U.S.

- Latin: Academia Batesina
- Former name: Maine State Seminary (1855–1863)
- Motto: Amore Ac Studio (Latin)
- Motto in English: With Ardor and Devotion
- Type: Private liberal arts college
- Established: March 16, 1855; 171 years ago
- Accreditation: NECHE
- Academic affiliations: Space-grant, Annapolis Group
- Endowment: $574.1 million (2026)
- Chairman: Gregory Ehret
- President: Garry Jenkins
- Faculty: 200 (2024)
- Undergraduates: 1,760 (2025)
- Location: Lewiston, Maine, U.S. 44°6′20″N 70°12′15″W
- Campus: Campus: 133 acres Bates Mountain: 600 acres Coastal Center: 80 acres Total: 813 acres
- Colors: Garnet
- Nickname: Bobcats
- Sporting affiliations: Division III – NESCAC; Division I – CSA; Division I – EISA; Inter-Collegiate – NEISA
- Website: www.bates.edu

Bates College (/beɪts/) is a private liberal arts college in Lewiston, Maine, United States. Anchored by the Historic Quad, the campus of Bates totals 813 acres (329 ha) with a small urban campus. It maintains 600 acres (240 ha) of nature preserve known as the Bates–Morse Mountain Conservation Area near Campbell Island and a coastal center on Atkins Bay. With an annual enrollment of approximately 1,800 students, it is the smallest college in its athletic conference.

The college was founded in 1855 by abolitionist statesman Oren Burbank Cheney and industrialist Benjamin Bates. It became the first coeducational college in New England and the third-oldest college in Maine, after Bowdoin and Colby. Bates provides undergraduate instruction in the humanities, social sciences, natural sciences, and engineering. The undergraduate program requires a thesis upon graduation. In addition to being a part of the "Maine Big Three", Bates competes in the New England Small College Athletic Conference (NESCAC) with 31 varsity teams and 9 club teams. The Bates Bobcats are a member of NCAA Division III and have produced 12 Olympians.

Bates alumni and affiliates include 86 Fulbright Scholars; 22 Watson Fellows; 5 Rhodes Scholars; 7 Emmy Award winners; 5 Pulitzer Prize winners; as well as 12 members of the U.S. Congress. (Note: As of the 2018 U.S. midterm elections, there have been 12 members of the United States Congress that are counted as alumni of Bates College. They are (in chronological order): 1. John P. Swasey (Class of 1859); 2. Daniel J. McGillicuddy (Class of 1881); 3. Carroll L. Beedy (Class of 1903); 4. Charles Clason (Class of 1911); 5. Donald Partridge (Class of 1914); 6. Edmund Muskie (Class of 1936); 7. Frank Coffin (Class of 1940); 8. Robert F. Kennedy (Class of 1944); 9. Leo Ryan (Class of 1944); 10. Robert Goodlatte (Class of 1974); 11. Ben Cline (Class of 1994); 12. Jared Golden (Class of 2011); Only Muskie and Kennedy have served in the United States Senate, representing Maine and New York, respectively. Kennedy and Ryan attended Bates for their V-12 Naval Program and received specialized degrees in 1944.) The college is home to the Stephens Observatory and the Bates College Museum of Art.

== History ==
=== Origins ===
While attending and leading the Freewill Baptist Parsonsfield Seminary, Bates founder Oren Burbank Cheney worked on various racial and gender equality, religious freedom, and temperance issues. In 1836, Cheney enrolled in Dartmouth College, due to the school's significant support of the abolitionist cause against slavery. The event caused Cheney to advocate for a new seminary in a more central part of Maine. The Maine State Seminary was chartered in 1855 and implemented a liberal arts and theological curriculum, making the first coeducational college in New England. Soon after establishment several donors stepped forward to finance portions of the school, such as Seth Hathorn, who donated the first library and academic building, which was renamed Hathorn Hall. Cobb Divinity School became affiliated with the college in 1866. Four years later in 1870, Bates sponsored a college preparatory school, called the Nichols Latin School. The college was affected by the financial panic of the later 1850s and required additional funding to remain operational. Local industrialist Benjamin Bates gave $100,000 in personal donations and overall contributions valued at $250,000 to the college. The school was renamed Bates College in his honor in 1863 and was chartered to offer a liberal arts curriculum beyond its original theological focus. Two years later the college would graduate the first woman to receive a college degree in New England, Mary Mitchell.

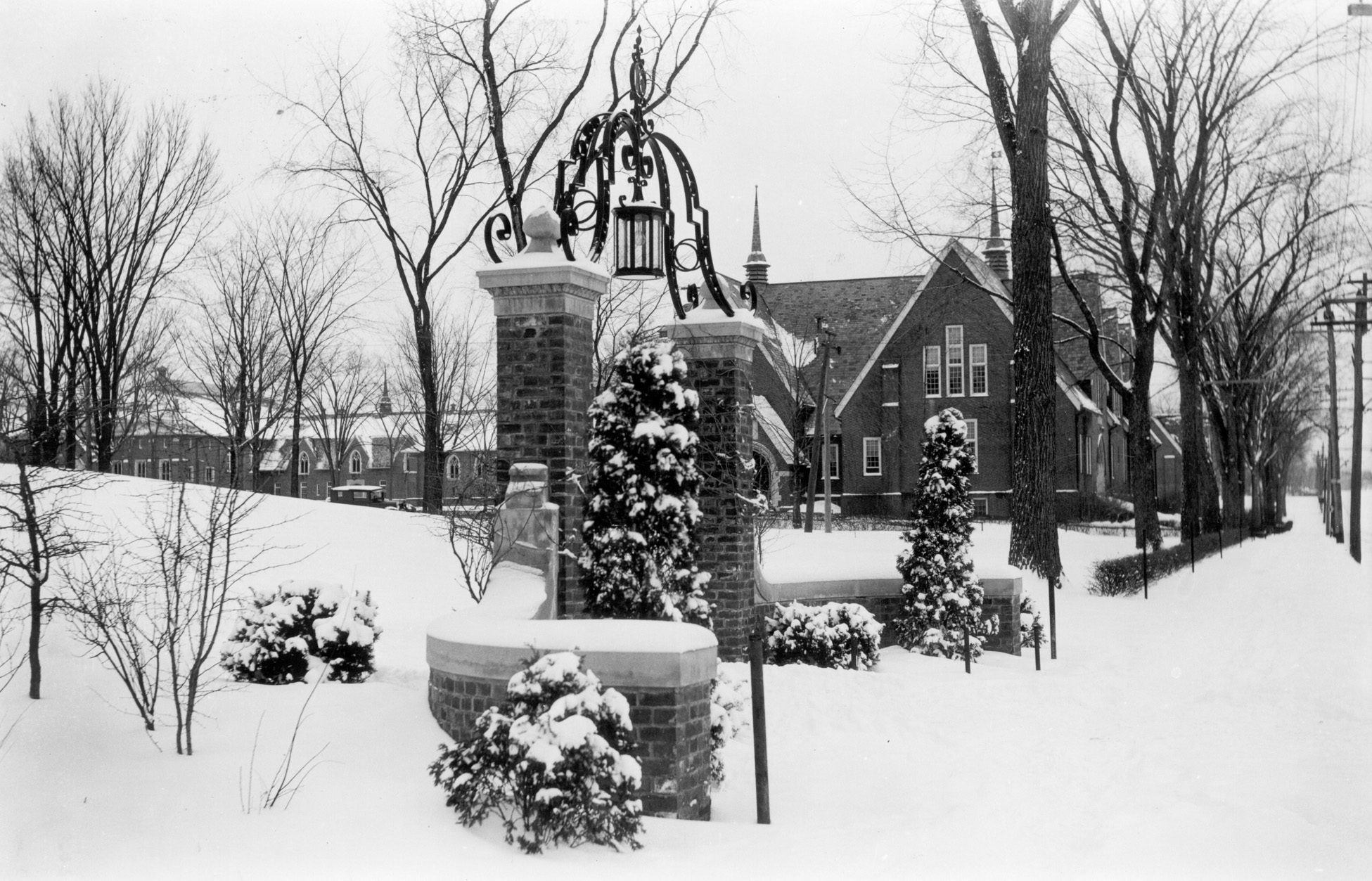
The college's garnet gateways, 1906

The college began instruction with a six-person faculty tasked with the teaching of moral philosophy and the classics. From its inception, Bates served as an alternative to a more traditional and historically conservative Bowdoin College. There is a complex relationship between the two colleges, revolving around socioeconomic class, academic quality, and collegiate athletics. The college, under the direction of Cheney, rejected fraternities and sororities on grounds of unwarranted exclusivity. He asked his close friend and U.S. Senator Charles Sumner to create a collegiate motto for Bates and he suggested the Latin phrase amore ac studio which he translated as "with love for learning" which has been taken as "with ardor and devotion," or "through zeal and study." Prior to the start of the American Civil War, Bates graduated Brevet Major Holman Melcher, who served in the Union Army. He was the first person to charge down Little Round Top at the Battle of Gettysburg. The college's first African-American student, Henry Chandler, graduated in 1874. In 1884, the college graduated the first woman to argue in front of the U.S. Supreme Court, Ella Haskell. In 1894, Stella James Sims became the first African-American woman graduate.

=== 20th century ===
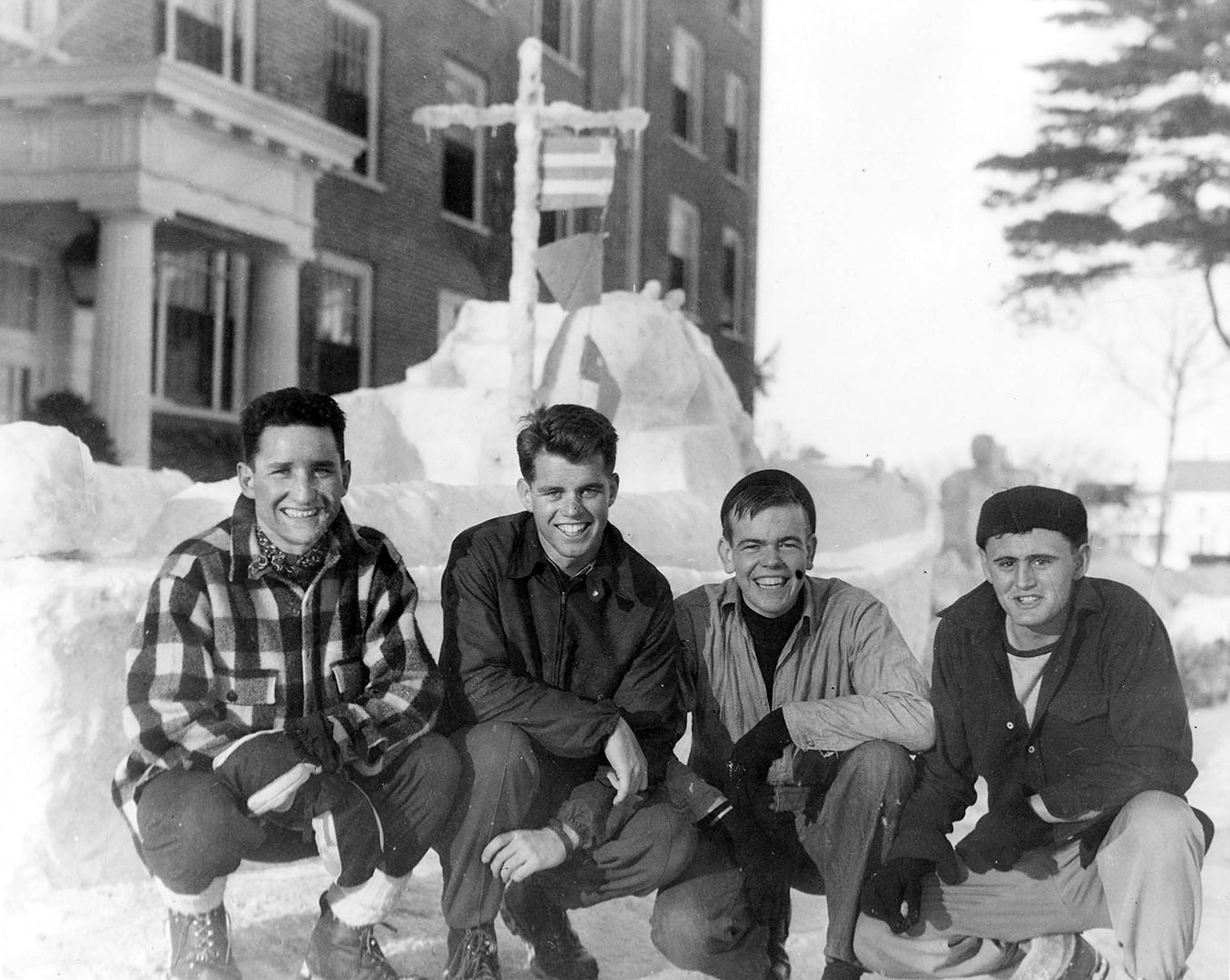
Robert F. Kennedy (second from left), in front of Smith Hall, during Winter Carnival, 1944

In 1894, George Colby Chase led Bates to increased national recognition, and the college graduated one of the founding members of the Boston Red Sox, Harry Lord. In 1920, the Outing Club was founded and is one of the oldest collegiate outing clubs in the country. The debate society of Bates, the Brooks Quimby Debate Council, became the first college debate team in the U.S. to compete internationally, and is the oldest collegiate coeducational debate team in the nation. In 1921, the college's debate team participated in the first intercontinental collegiate debate in history against the Oxford Union's debate team at the University of Oxford. Oxford's first debate in the United States was against Bates in Lewiston, in September 1923. In 1943, the V-12 Navy College Training Program was introduced at Bates. During the war, a victory ship was named the SS Bates Victory, after the college. It was during this time future U.S. Attorney General Robert F. Kennedy enrolled along with hundreds of other sailor-students. The college began to garner a reputation for predominately educating white students who come from upper-middle-class to affluent backgrounds. The New York Times detailed the atmosphere of the college in the 1960s with the following: "the prestigious Bates College—named for Benjamin E. Bates, whose riverfront mill on Canal Street in Lewiston was once Maine's largest employer—provided an antithesis: a leafy oasis of privilege."

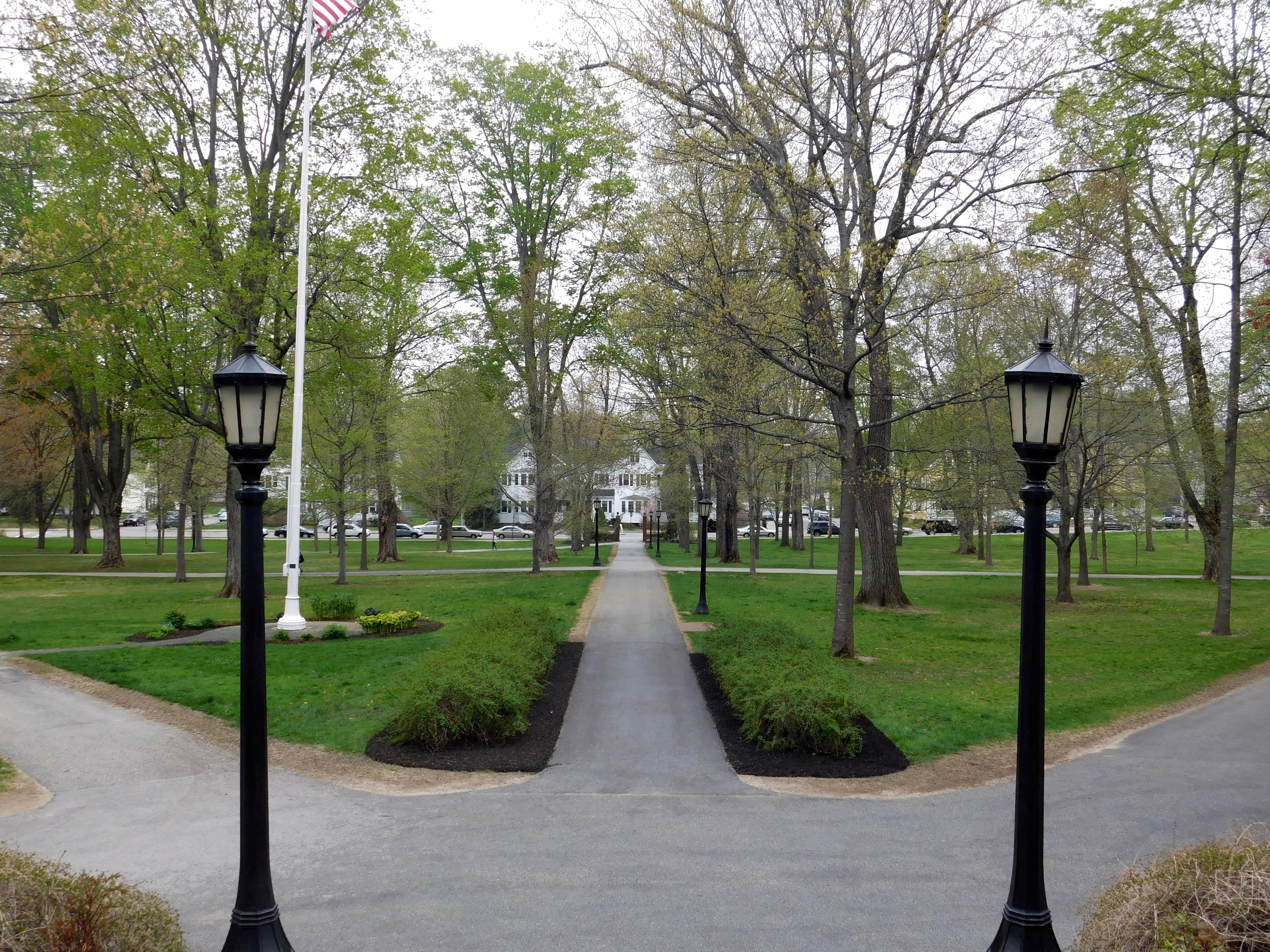
View from the steps of Hathorn Hall in 2015

During this time the college began to compete athletically with Colby College, and in 1964, with Bowdoin created the Colby-Bates-Bowdoin Consortium. In 1967, President Thomas Hedley Reynolds promoted the idea of teacher-scholars at Bates and secured the construction of numerous academic and recreational buildings. In 1984, Bates became one of the first liberal arts colleges to make the SAT and ACT optional in the admission process. In 1989, Donald West Harward took over the presidency and built 22 new academic, residential and athletic facilities. During the 1990s and mid-2000s, Bates consolidated its reputation of being a "playground for the elite", by educating upper-middle-class to affluent Americans, which led to student protests and reforms to make the college more diverse.

=== 21st century ===
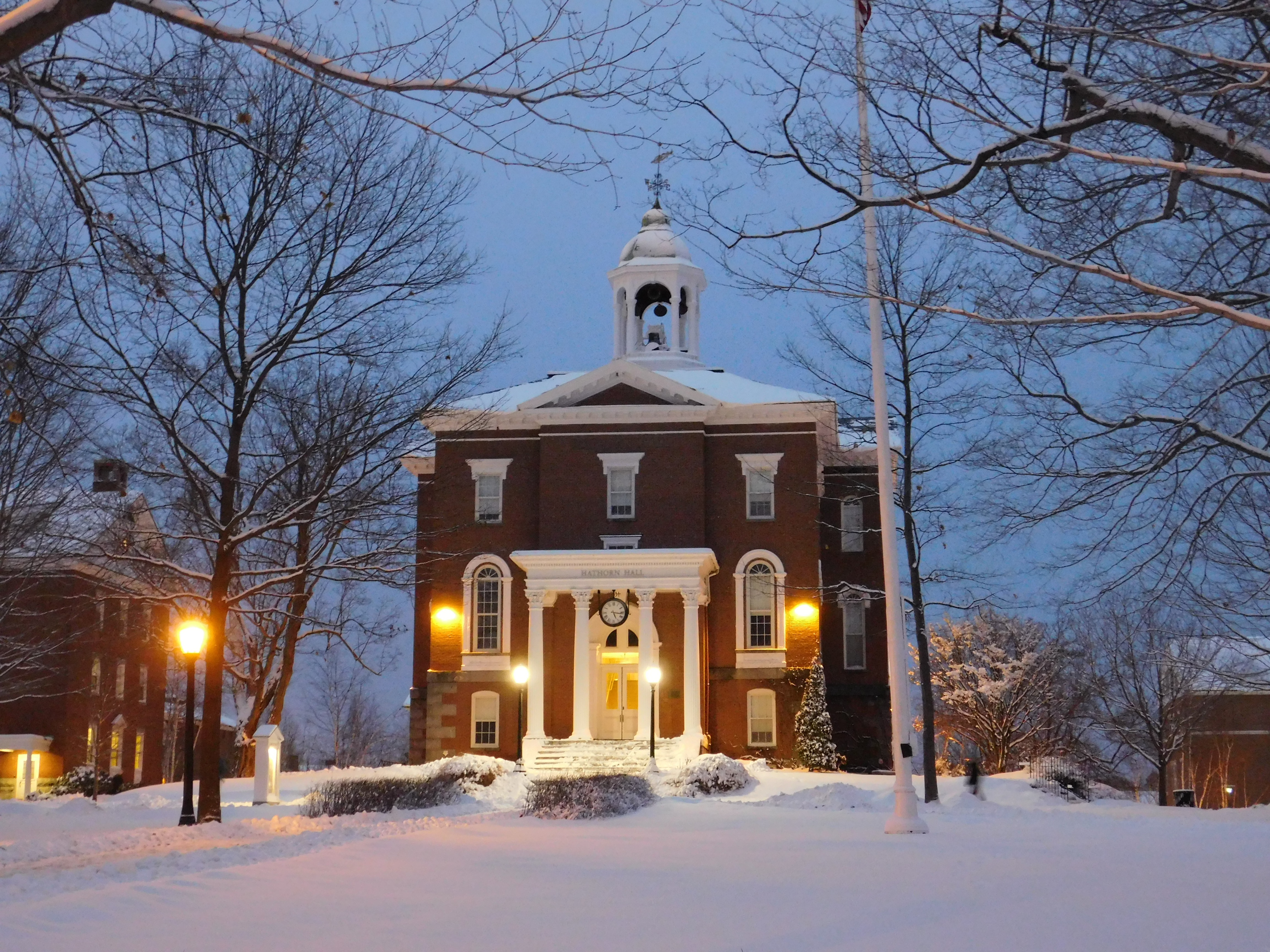
Hathorn Hall, 2015

Academic Elaine Tuttle Hansen was elected as the first female president of Bates and managed its second-largest capital campaign, totaling $120 million, and later led the college through the 2008 financial crisis. In 2012, Bates made national headlines for being named the most expensive college in the U.S., which received media coverage as it highlighted stark socioeconomic inequality among students.

In 2012, Clayton Spencer, a dean of Harvard University, assumed the Bates presidency and created diversity mandates, expanded student and faculty recruitment, and financial aid. While some reforms were successful, minorities at the college, typically classified as non-white and low-income students, still reported financial insecurity and social elitism. According to The New York Times in 2017, 18% of Bates students came from the 1% of the American upper class, with more than half coming from the top 5%. According to the Portland Press Herald, businessman Michael Bonney '80 and his family donated $50 million to Bates, the largest ever donation to a Maine college at the time. This honor was lost with a $150,000,000 anonymous lead donation to the Colby College “Dare Northward” campaign in 2025. As part of their fundraising campaign from 2017 to 2022, Bates raised $345.7 million.

Journalist Ron Lieber of The New York Times noted that need-aware colleges like Bates prioritized students who could pay full tuition in the admission process, writing that, "you can get help if you're admitted, but you might not be admitted if you need help." This impacted tuition affordability at Bates, according to The Chronicle of Higher Education. Legal scholar Garry Jenkins was appointed president in 2023, becoming the first black president of Bates.

== Academics ==
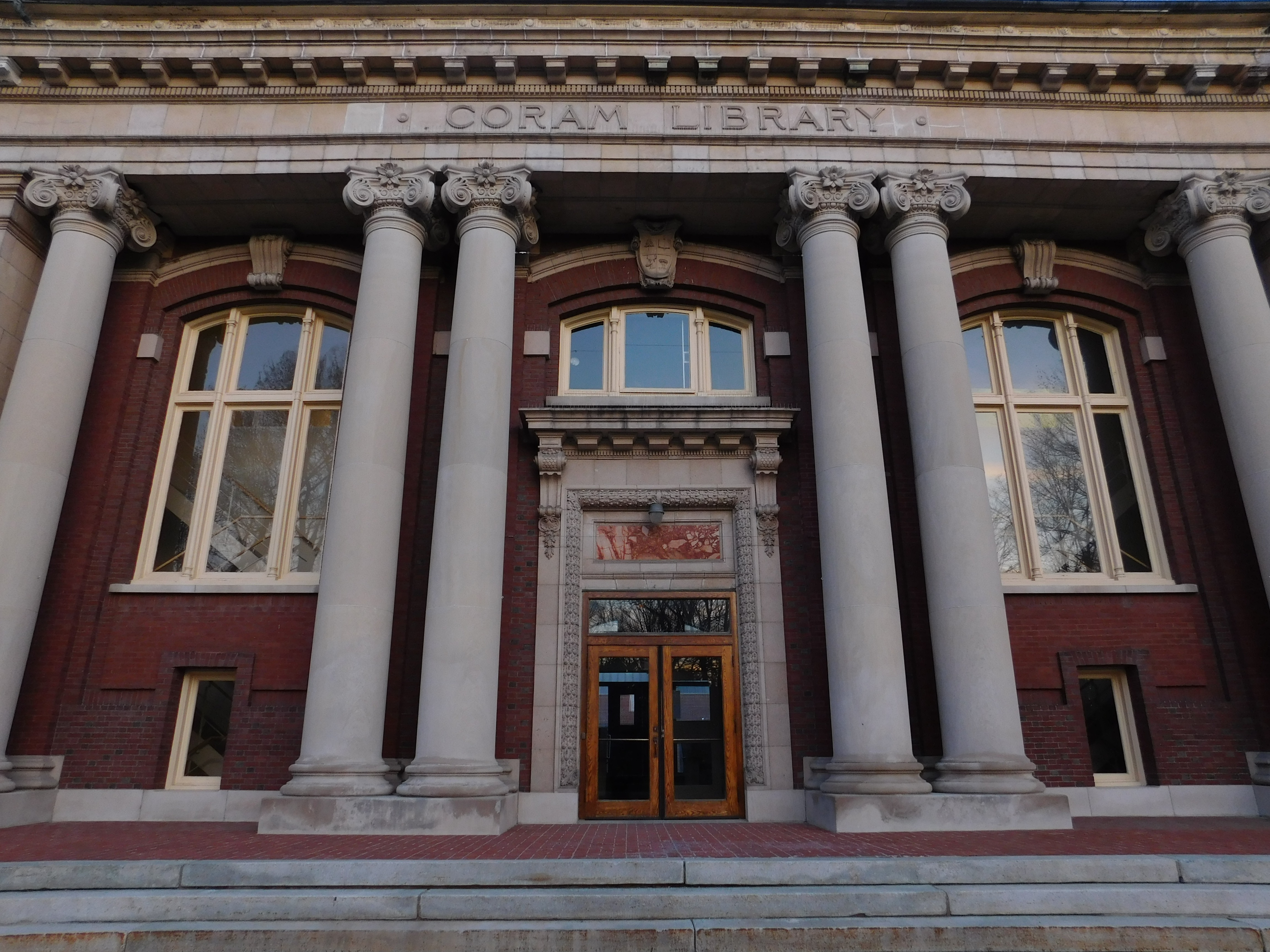
The entrance to Coram Library in 2017

Bates offers 36 departmental and interdisciplinary program majors and 25 secondary concentrations, and confers a variety of undergraduate degrees. The college enrolls around 1,800 students, 200 of whom study abroad each semester. The academic year is broken up into three terms, primary, secondary, and short term, also known as the 4–4–1 academic calendar. This includes two semesters, plus a "Short Term" consisting of five weeks in the Spring, in which only one class is taken with in-depth coursework.

The largest natural science academic department is biology, followed by mathematics, physics, and geology. The social science academic department with the highest number of majors is its economics department, followed by psychology, political science, and history. The largest humanities academic department is the English department, followed by French and francophone studies, art and visual culture, and rhetoric. Bates also offers a Liberal Arts-Engineering Dual Degree Program with Dartmouth College's Thayer School of Engineering, Columbia University's School of Engineering and Applied Science, and Washington University's School of Engineering and Applied Science. Bates is accredited by the New England Commission of Higher Education.

=== Research and faculty ===
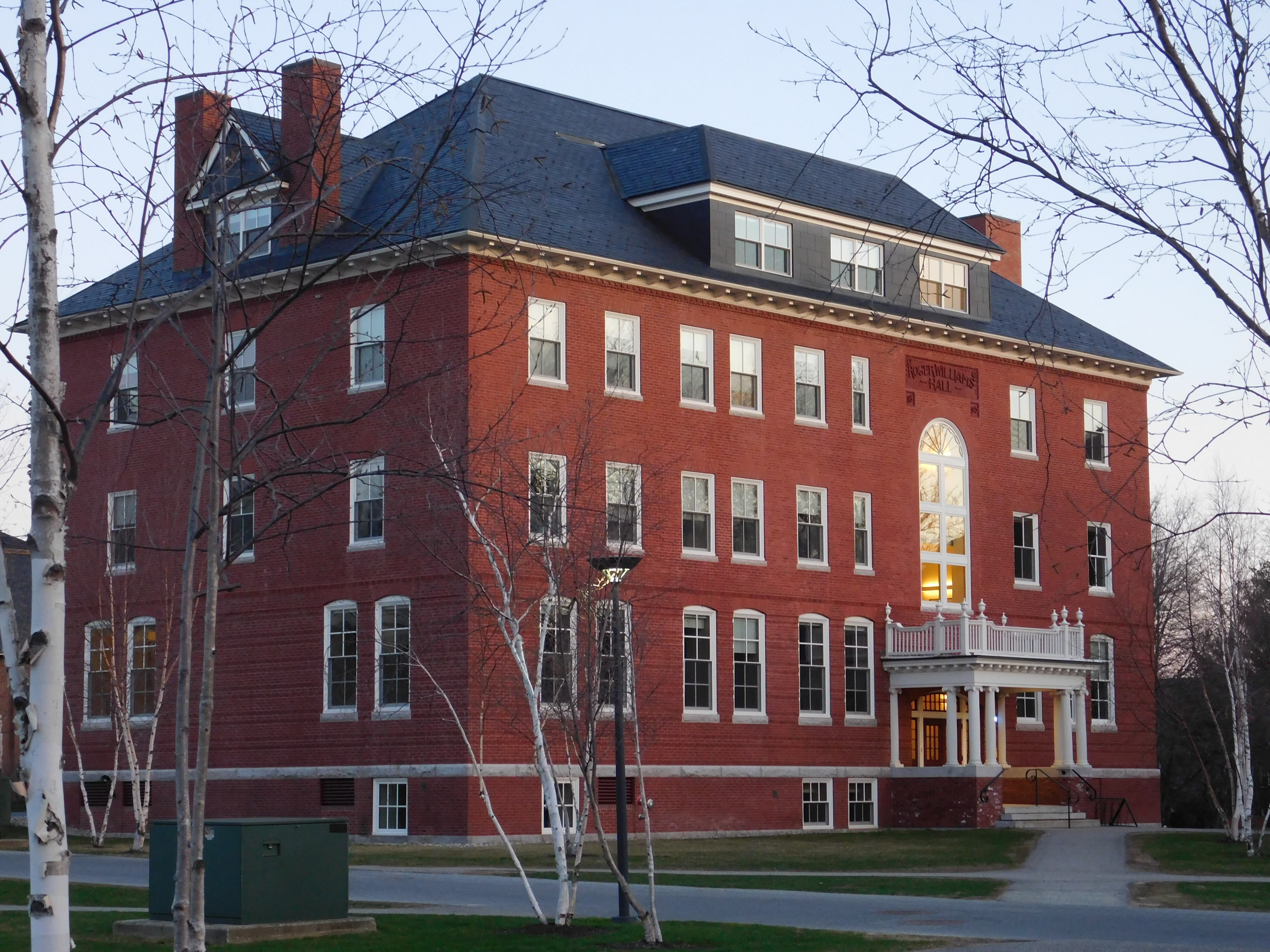
Roger Williams Hall, 2015

As of 2026, Bates has 9:1 student-faculty ratio and the average class size is about fifteen students. All tenured faculty possess the highest degree in their field. Full-time professors at the college received an average total compensation of $123,066 in 2015, with salaries and benefits varying from field to field and position to position, putting faculty pay in the top 17% of all public and private universities. The college's Harward Center is its main research entity for community-based research and offers fellowships to students. According to a 2001 study, Bates' economics department was the most cited liberal arts department in the United States.

According to the U.S. National Science Foundation, the college received $1.15 million in grants, fellowships, and R&D stipends for research. The college spent $1.58 million in 2014 on research and development. The Bates Student Research Fund was established for students completing independent research or capstones. STEM grants are offered to students in the science, engineering, technology and mathematics fields. Independent research grants from the college can range from $300 to over $200,000 for a three-year research program depending on donor or agency.

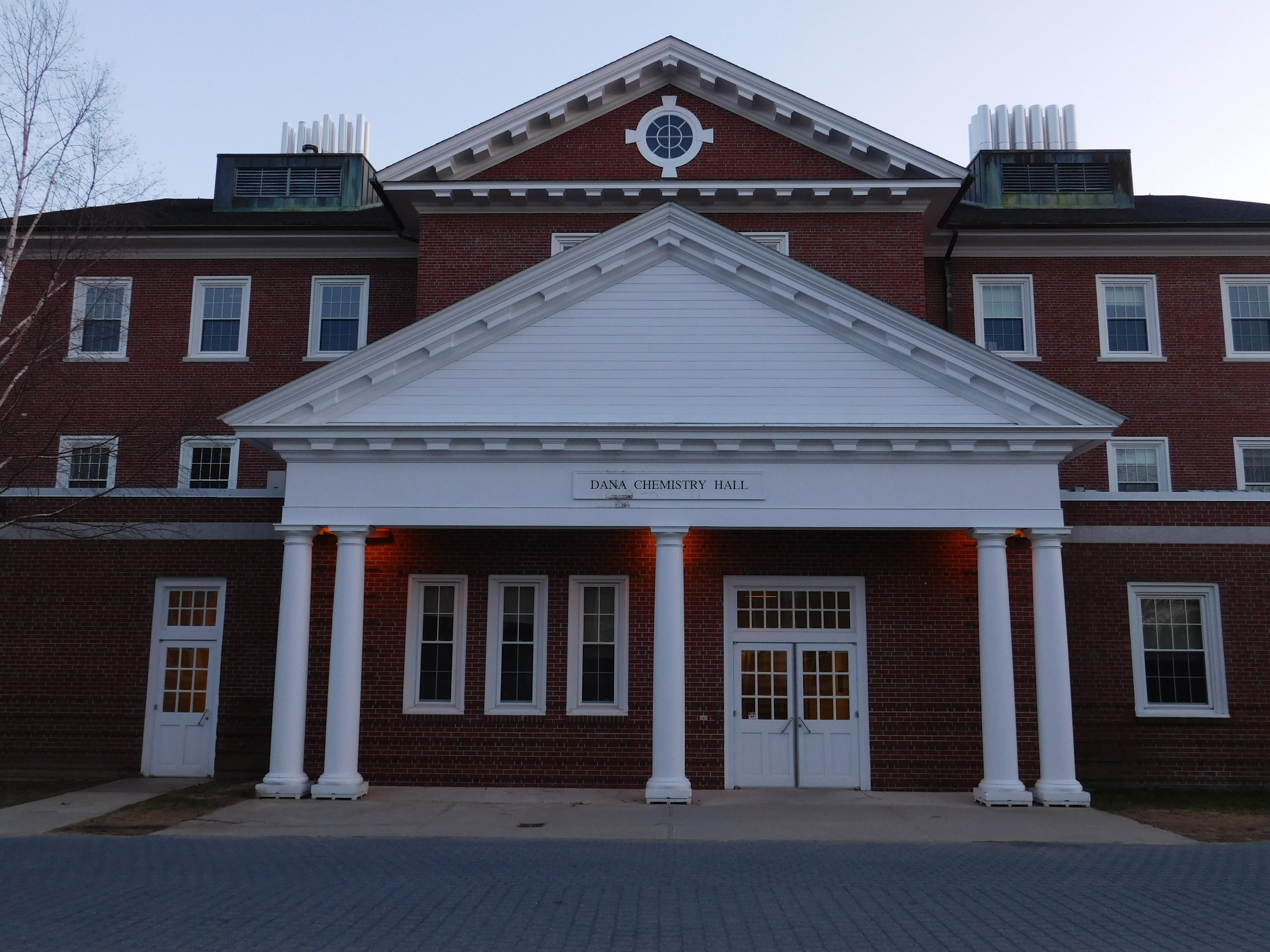
Dana Chemistry Hall in 2015

Bates has been the site of landmark experiments and academic movements. In chemistry, the college has played an important role in shaping ideas about inorganic chemistry and is considered the birthplace of inorganic photochemistry as its early manifestations were started at the college by 1943 alumnus George Hammond who was later dubbed "the father of the movement". Hammond would go on to invent Hammond's postulate, revolutionizing activation levels in chemical compounds. In physics, 1974 alumnus Steven Girvin credited his time at the college as pivotal in his development of the fractional quantum Hall effect, now a pillar in Hall conductance.

During the development and production of the first nuclear weapons during World War II, two students researching nuclear chemistry at the college were hired by the United States Army Corps of Engineers as part of the first Manhattan project scientific team. Atop the Carnegie Science Hall sits Stephens Observatory which houses the college's high-powered 12-inch Newtonian reflecting telescope. The telescope is used for research by the college, local government agencies, and other educational institutions. The Observatory is also home to an eight-inch Celestron, a six-inch Meade starfinder, and the only Coronado Solarmax II 60 telescope in Maine.

=== Mount David Summit ===
The college holds the annual Mount David Summit which serves as a platform for students of all years to present undergraduate research, creative art, performance, and various other academic projects and is named after the campus' Mount David. Presentations at the summit include various discipline-centered projects, themed panel discussions, film screenings, as well as other activities in the Lewiston area. Started in 2002, the Summit is held in Pettengill Hall.

== Admissions ==
Admissions statistics
- 2019 entering class
- Admit rate: 12.1% (▼ −11.8)
- Yield rate: 50.0% (▲ +11.7)

Test scores middle 50%^{[i]}
- SAT EBRW: 630–750
- SAT Math: 640–730
- ACT Composite: 29–33

High school GPA^{[ii]}
- Top 10%: 71.4 (▲ +2)
- Top 25%: 89.5 (▼ −6)
- Top 50%: 99.0 (▼ −1)

For the class of 2023, Bates admitted 12.1% of all applicants, the lowest-ever for the college. During the 2018–19 admission rounds, Bates accepted seven transfer students from 205 applicants, yielding a 3.4% transfer acceptance rate. The college has had years where no transfer applicants were accepted, such as in 2016–17, where all 170 applicants failed to gain admission. The college had its highest admit rate during the 2008–09 year, accepting 30.4% of applicants.

The average high school GPA for the class of 2019 was an unweighted 3.71. The average SAT Score was 2135 (715 Critical Reasoning, 711 Mathematics and 709 Writing), and the average ACT score range was 28 to 32. Bates has a Test Optional Policy, which gives the applicant the choice to not submit their standardized test scores. Bates' non-submitting students averaged only 0.05 points lower on their collegiate grade point average. The Wall Street Journal found that Bates had some of the "toughest rejection letters" in the U.S. during the late-2000s. The college later apologized and issued a statement assuring that it makes an effort to "[deny] the student's application... not [reject] the student".

=== Cost of attendance and financial aid ===
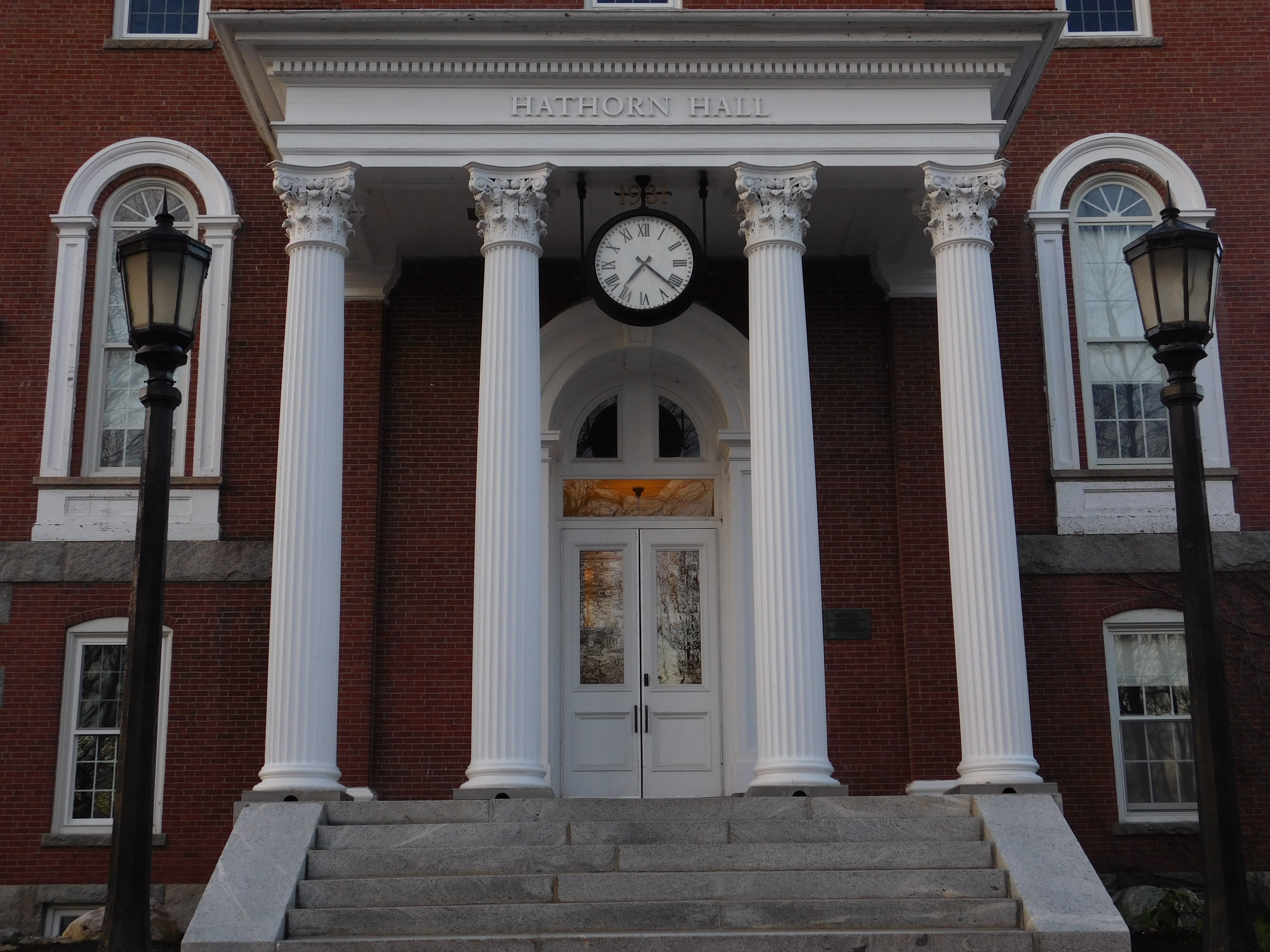
Entrance to Hathorn Hall in 2015

For the 2025–26 academic year, Bates charged a comprehensive price (tuition, room and board, and associated fees) of $89,930. The college's tuition is the same for in-state and out-of-state students. Bates practices need-blind admission for students who are U.S. citizens, permanent residents, DACA status students, undocumented students, or who graduate from a high school within the U.S., and meets all of the demonstrated need for all admitted students, including admitted international students. Bates does not offer merit or athletic scholarships. Bates is often the most expensive school to attend in its athletic conference. It has the second-lowest percentage of Pell Grant recipients in the U.S., below only Fairfield University.

=== Demographics ===
For the class of 2025, the gender demographic of the college breaks down to 47% male and 53% female. 27% of U.S. students are students of color and 12% of admitted students are first-generation to college. The educational background for admitted students is mixed: 49% of students attended public schools and 51% attended private schools. About 90% of this incoming class graduated in the top decile of their high school classes. Bates has a 95% freshman retention rate. A significant portion of 45% of all applicants, transfer and non-transfer, are from New England. About 89% of students are out-of-state and the college has students from 73 countries.

== Rankings and reputation ==
Academic rankings

Liberal arts
- U.S. News & World Report: 24
- Washington Monthly: 14

National
- Forbes: 80
- WSJ/College Pulse: 64

Bates is one of the Little Ivies, along with universities such as Amherst, Bowdoin, Colby, Connecticut College, Hamilton, Middlebury, Trinity, Tufts, Wesleyan, and Williams. The college is known as one of the Hidden Ivies, which includes much larger research universities such as Johns Hopkins and Stanford University. The 2026 annual ranking by U.S. News & World Report ranked Bates tied for 24th overall best liberal arts college in the nation. Forbes ranked Bates 80th in its 2025 national rankings of 500 U.S. colleges, universities and service academies, and 20th among liberal arts colleges. In 2025, Washington Monthly ranked Bates 14th among 190 liberal arts colleges in the U.S. based on its contribution to the public good, as measured by social mobility, research, and promoting public service.

== Campus ==
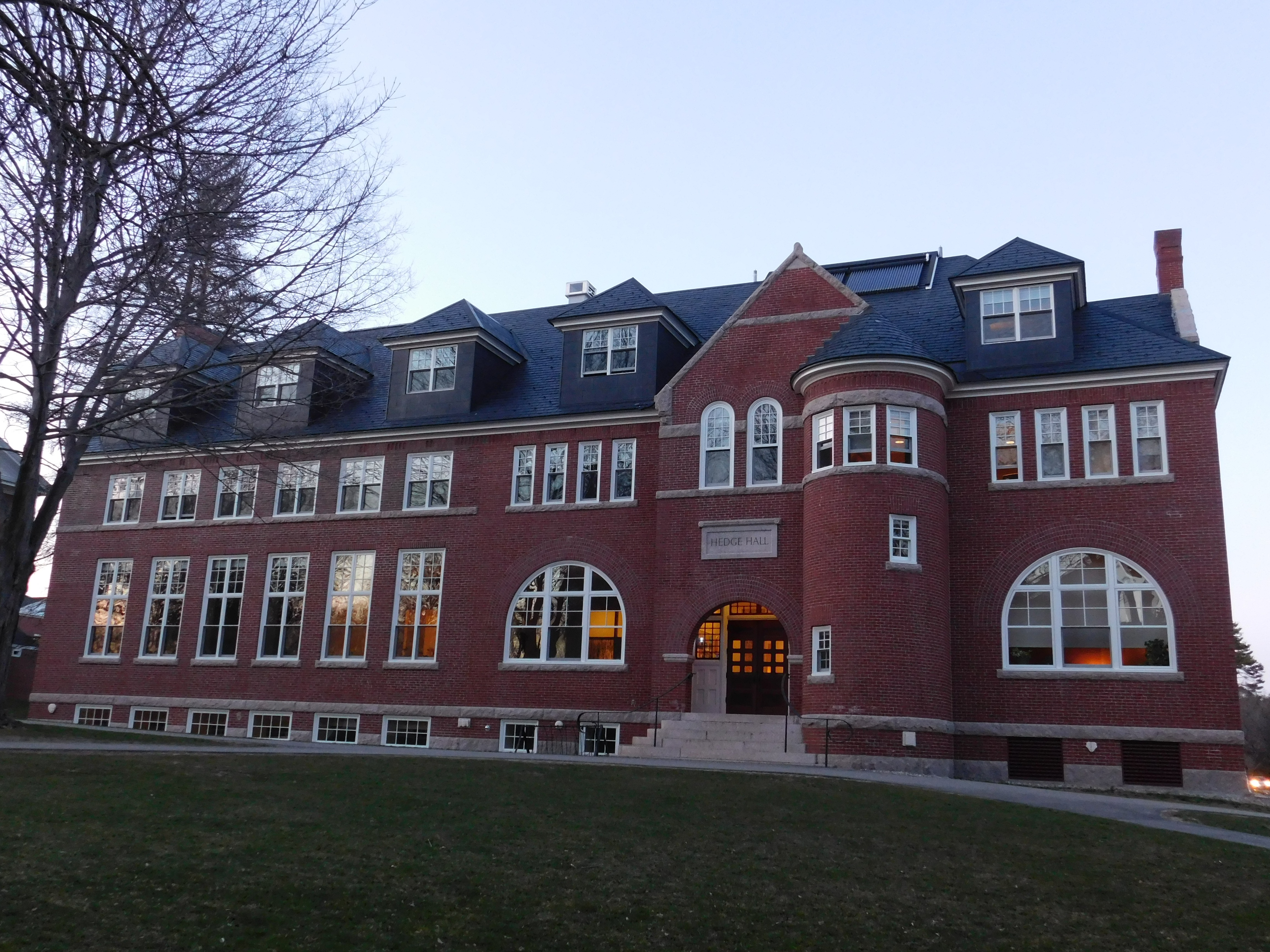
Hedge Hall, named after Isaiah Hedge, in 2016

Bates has a 133-acre main campus in Lewiston and maintains the 600-acre Bates-Morse Mountain Conservation Area, as well as an 80-acre Coastal Center fresh water habitat at Shortridge. The eastern campus is situated around Lake Andrews, where many residential halls are located. The campus provides 33 Victorian houses, 9 residential halls, and one residential village. The college maintains 12 academic buildings. Lane Hall houses the offices of the president, dean of the faculty, registrar, and provost. The earliest buildings of the college were directly designed by Boston architect Gridley J.F. Bryant with subsequent buildings following his overall architectural style.

The college houses over 1 million volumes of articles, papers, subscriptions, audio-video items and government articles among all three libraries and all academic buildings. The George and Helen Ladd Library houses 620,000 cataloged volumes, 2,500 serial subscriptions and 27,000 audio/video items. Coram Library houses almost 200,000 volumes of articles, subscriptions and audio/video items.

=== Olin Arts Center ===
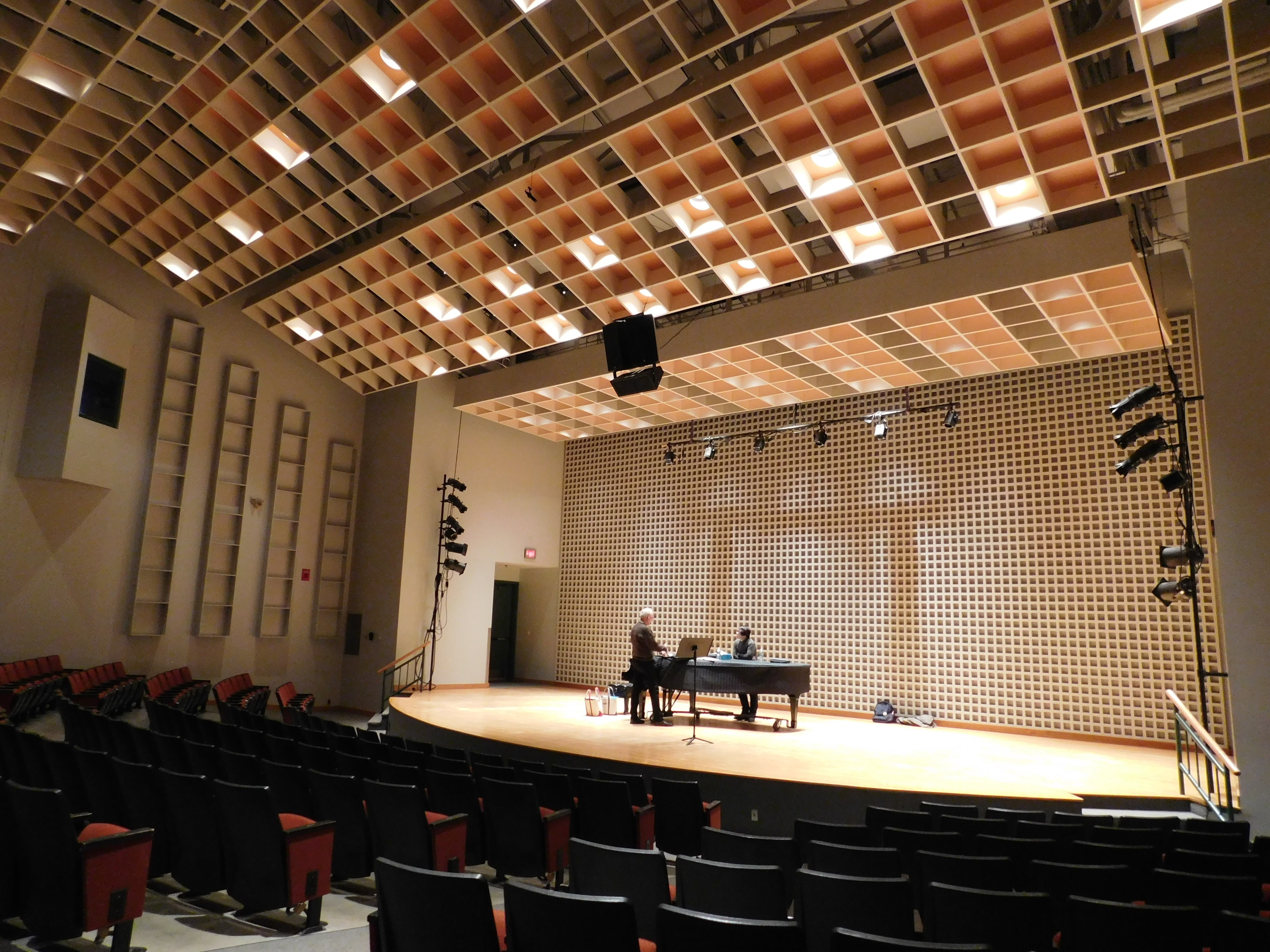
Olin Concert Hall in 2015

The Olin Arts Center maintains three teaching sound-proof studios, five classrooms, five seminar rooms, ten practice rooms with pianos, and a 300-seat grand recital hall. The studios are modernized with computers, synthesizers, and various recording equipment. The center houses the departments of Art and Music, and was given to Bates by the F. W. Olin Foundation in 1986. The center has had numerous artists-in-residence. The Olin Arts Center collaborates with the Maine Music Society to produce musical performances throughout Maine.

=== Museum of Art ===
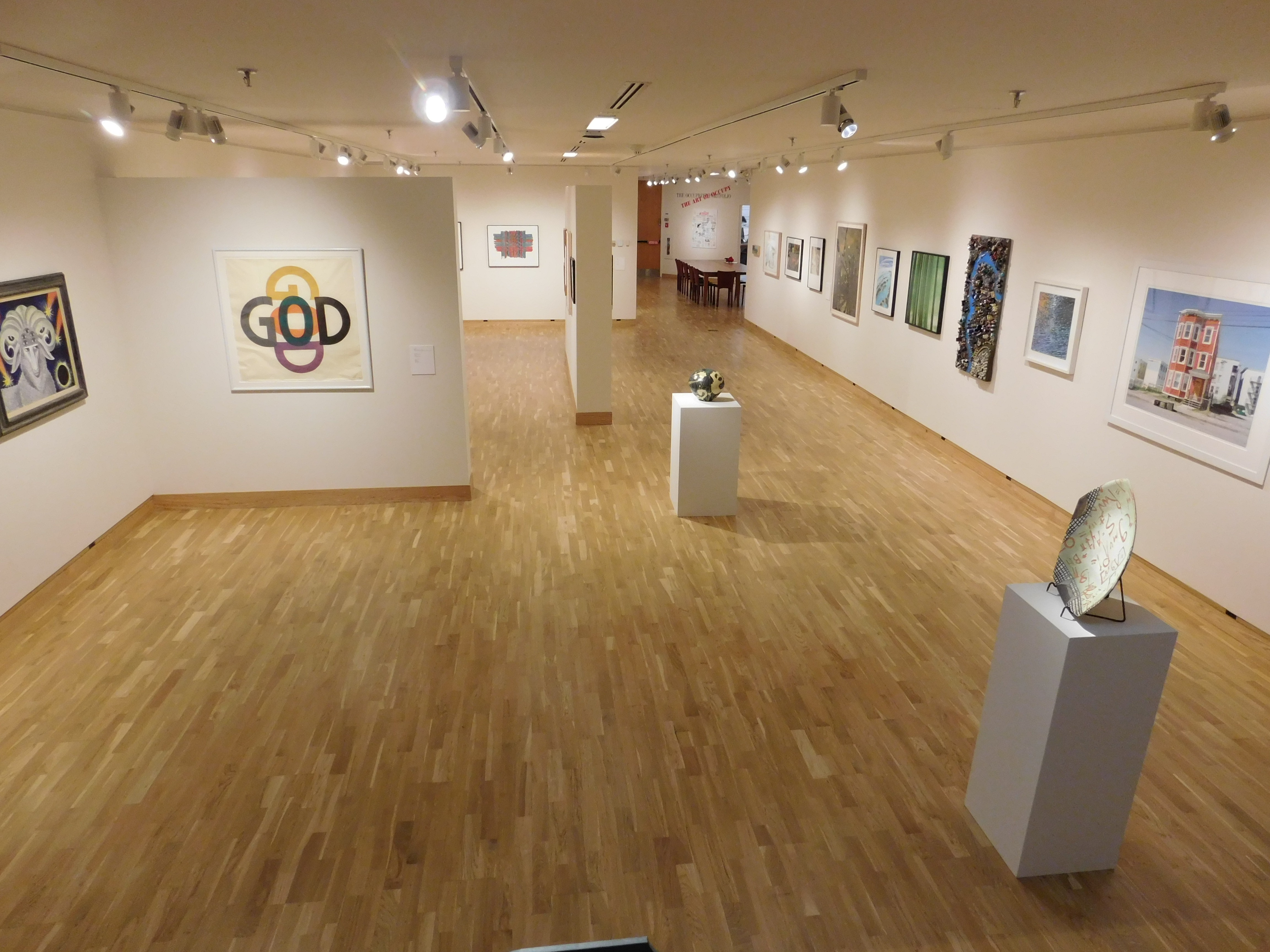
Bates College Museum of Art, 2017

Founded in 1955, the Bates College Museum of Art holds contemporary and historic pieces. It holds 5,000 pieces and objects of contemporary domestic and international art. The museum holds over 100 original artworks, photographs and sketches from Marsden Hartley. Almost 20,000 visitors visit the museum annually.

=== Bates-Morse Mountain Area ===
This conservation area of 600 acres is available to Bates students for academic, extracurricular, and research purposes. Due to its overall size, the site is frequently used by other Maine schools for their Nordic skiing practices.

== Student life ==
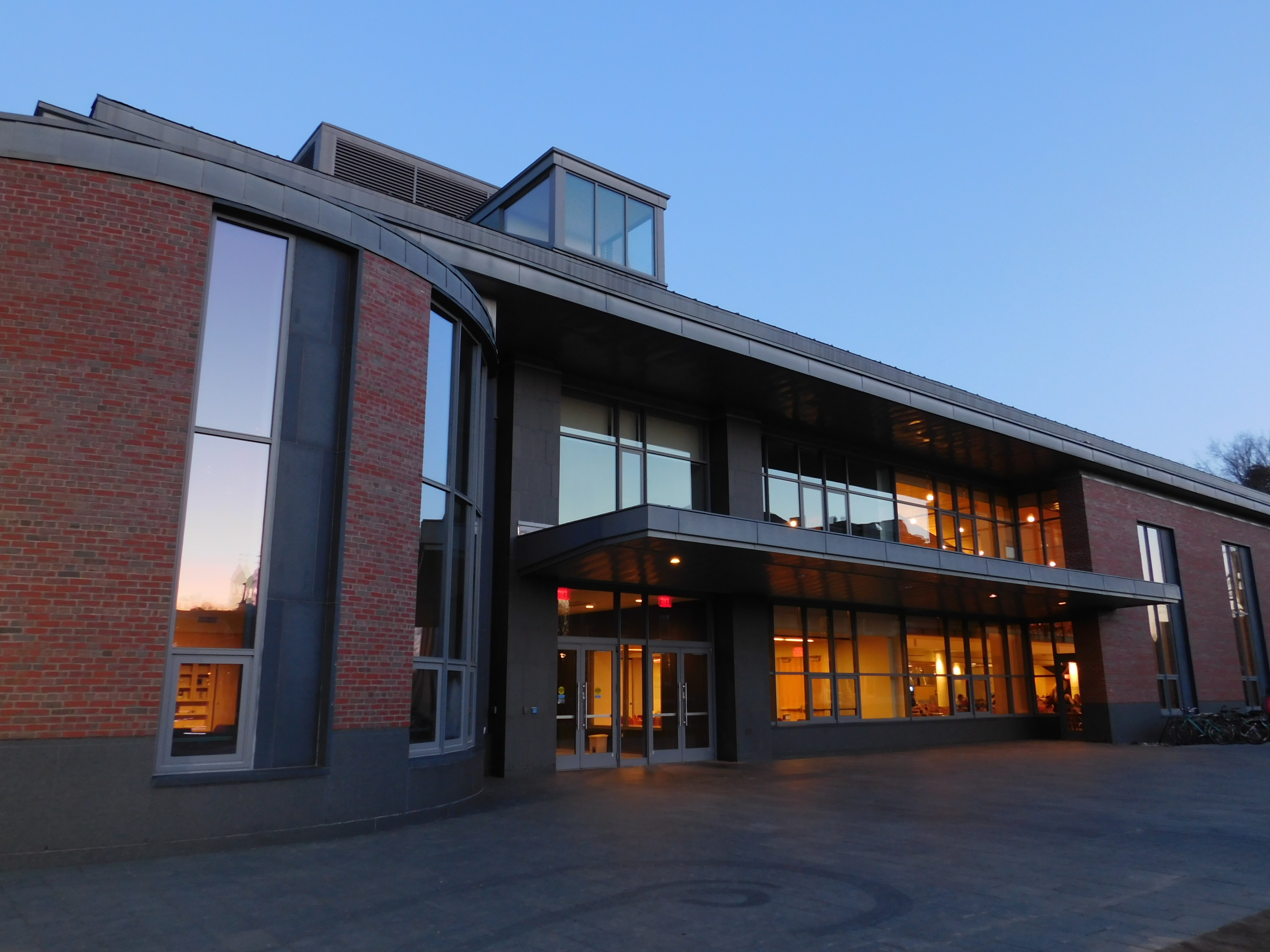
The college's dining complex, the Commons, in 2016

The college offers students 110 clubs and organizations on campus. The largest club is the Outing Club, which leads canoeing, kayaking, rafting, camping and backpacking trips throughout Maine. Although Bates has since conception rejected fraternities and sororities, various social groups exist. Since the 2000s, Bates has ranked highly on national rankings of college dining, including 6th in 2015 (The Princeton Review), and 8th in 2016 (Niche). The college's dining services have continuously received the grade of 'A+' by Niche since 2012. The college makes a concentrated effort to purchase foods from suppliers and producers in Maine. The Bobcat Den serves as an on-campus restaurant. Martin Luther King Day at Bates is celebrated annually with classes being canceled observance.

The Bates Student (1877) is the oldest coeducational college newspaper in America.

=== Student media ===
==== The Bates Student ====
Bates College's oldest newspaper is The Bates Student, created in 1873. It is one of the oldest continuously published college weeklies in the United States, and the oldest co-ed college weekly in the country. Alumni of the student media programs at Bates have won the Pulitzer Prize, and have their later work featured on major news sources. It circulates approximately 1,900 copies around the campus and Lewiston area. Since 1990, there has been an electronic version of the newspaper online.

==== WRBC ====
WRBC is the college radio station of Bates College and was first aired in 1958. Originally started as an AM station at Bates, it began with the efforts of rhetoric professor and debate coach Brooks Quimby. It is ranked by the 2015 Princeton Review as the 12th-best college radio station in the United States and Canada, making it the top college radio in the NESCAC.

=== A cappella ===
There are five auditioned a cappella groups on campus. The Deansmen and the Manic Optimists are all-male, the Merimanders are all-female, and the co-ed groups are known as TakeNote and the CrossTones.

=== Brooks Quimby Debate Council ===
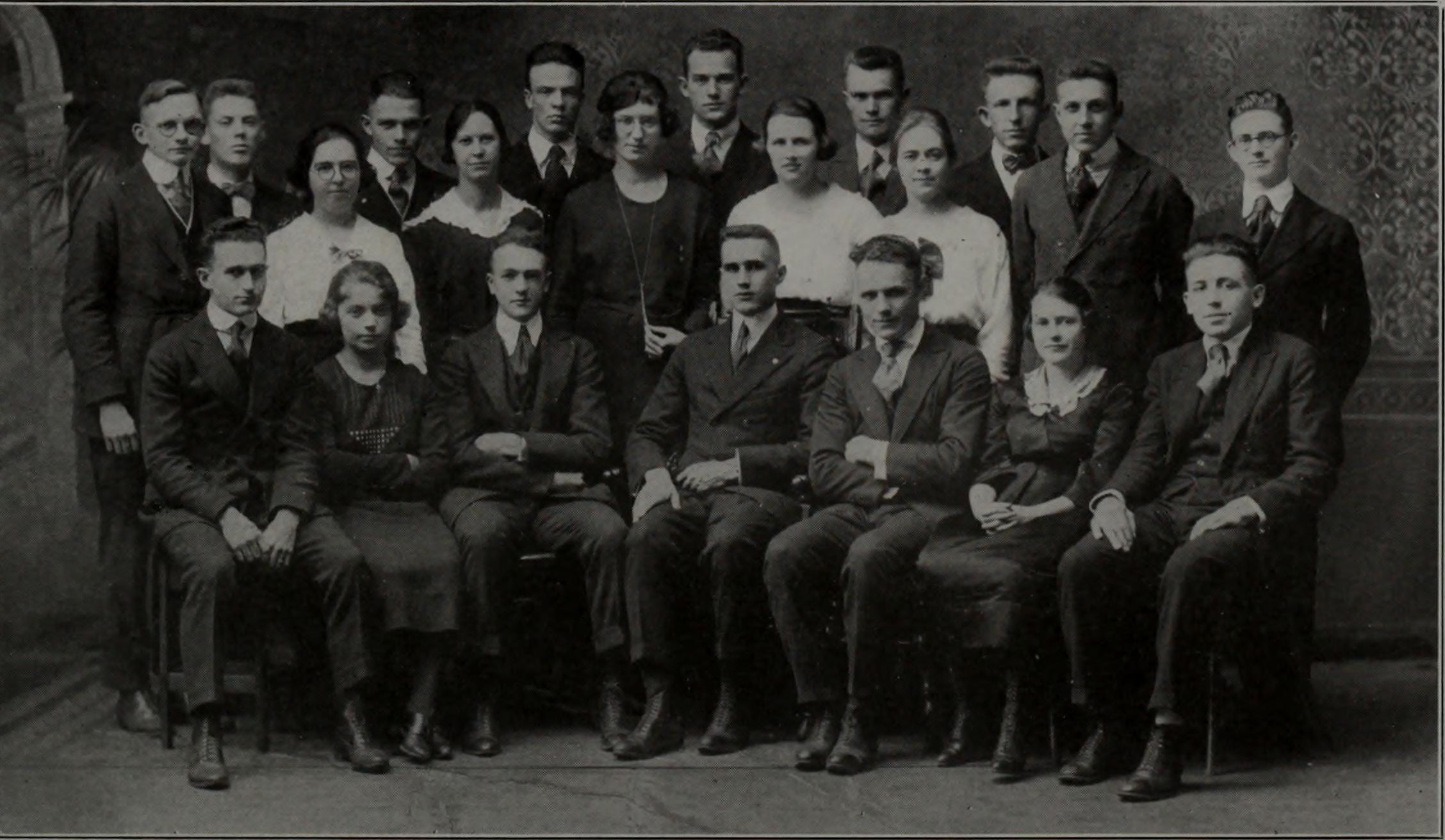
Members of the Brooks Quimby Debate Council, 1924, named after Brooks Quimby, who served as a debate mentor to Robert F. Kennedy and Edmund Muskie.

The formation of the team predates the establishment of the college itself as the debate society was founded within the Maine State Seminary making it the oldest coeducational college debate society in the United States. It was headed by Bates alumnus and teacher Brooks Quimby and became the first intercollegiate international debate team in the United States. The Quimby Debate Society has been noted as "America's most prestigious debating society," and the "playground of the powerful." Bates has an annual and traditional debate with Oxford, Cambridge and Dartmouth College. It competes in the American Parliamentary Debate Association domestically, and competes in the World Universities Debating Championships, internationally. The debate council was ranked 5th nationally in 2013, the year prior year ranking 9th in the world.

=== Traditions ===
==== Ivy Day ====
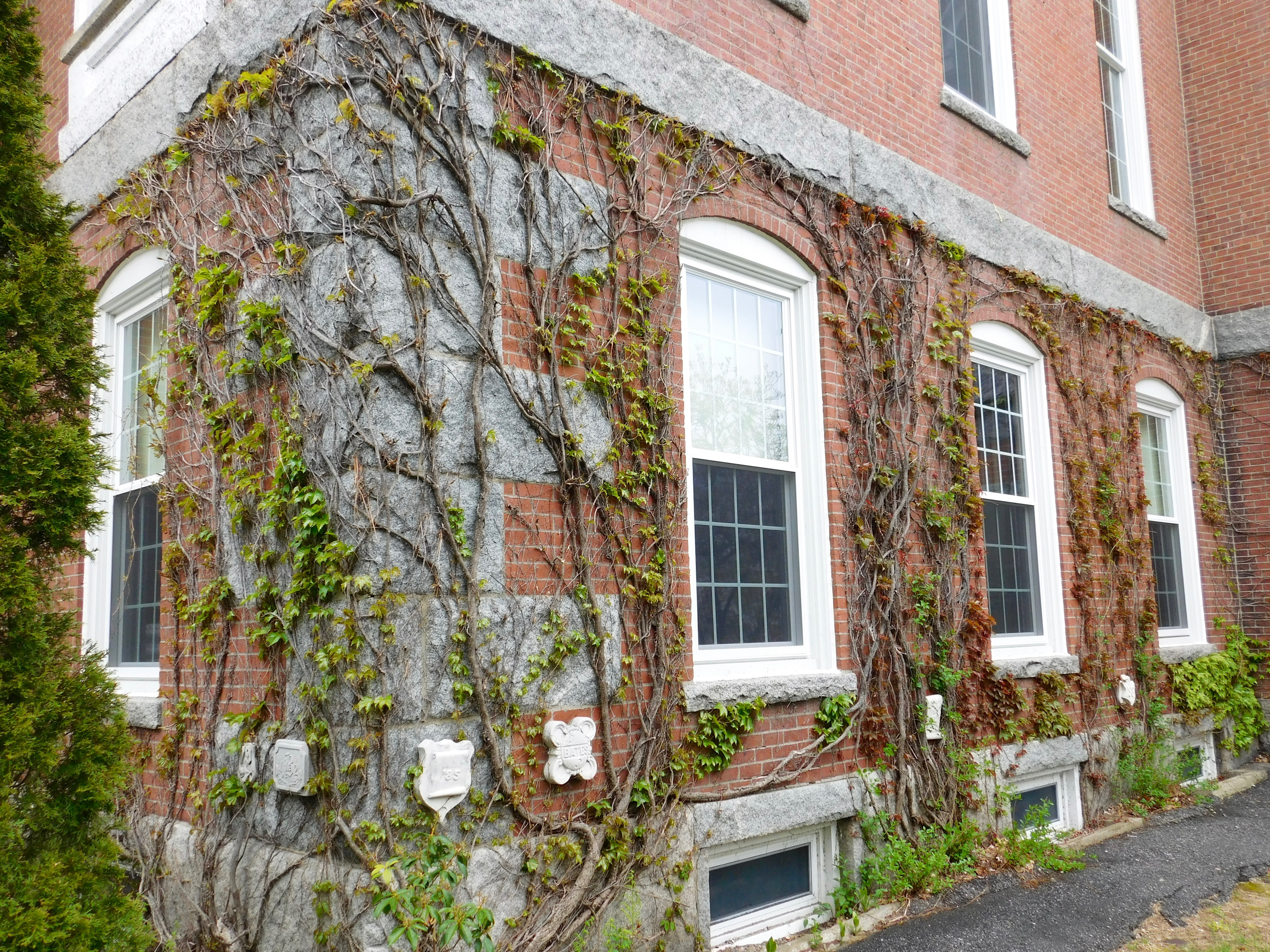
Hathorn Hall, in 2015, featuring respective classes' Ivy stones, in celebration of the college's Ivy Day

The class graduates participate in an Ivy Day which installs a granite placard onto one of the academic or residential buildings on campus. This usually occurs on graduation day, but may occur on later dates with alumni returning to the campus. On Ivy Day, members of Phi Beta Kappa are announced.

==== Winter Carnival ====
The college has held, on odd to even years, a Winter Carnival which comprises a themed four-day event that includes performances, dances, and games. This tradition is nearly a century old. When alumnus Edmund Muskie was governor, he participated in a torch relay from Augusta to Lewiston in celebration of the 1960 Winter Olympics during the carnival. Robert F. Kennedy, with his naval classmates, built a replica of their boat back in Massachusetts out of snow in front of Smith Hall, during their carnival. This tradition is second only to Dartmouth College as the oldest of its kind in the United States. The carnival has been hosted by the Bates Outing Club since its inception. On the Friday of Winter Carnival, the Outing Club initiates the annual Puddle Jump, wherein a hole is cut by a chainsaw or axe in Lake Andrews and students jump in.

== Athletics ==
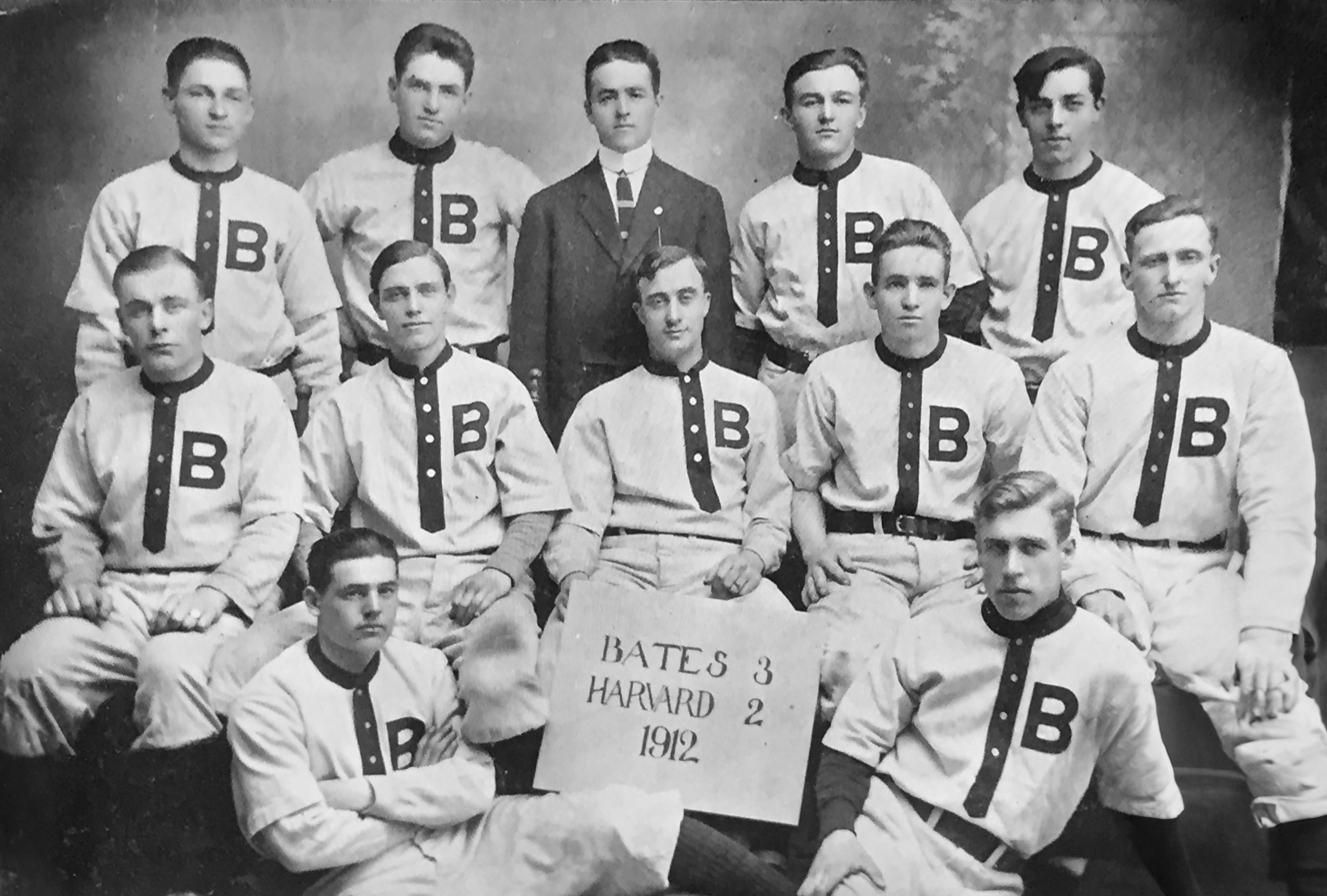
The Bates baseball team in 1912, opposite Harvard

Bates maintains 31 varsity teams, and 9 club teams, including sailing, cycling, ice hockey, rugby, and water polo. The college's official mascot is the bobcat and official color is garnet. The college athletically competes in the NCAA Division III as a member of the New England Small College Athletic Conference (NESCAC), which also includes Amherst, Connecticut, Hamilton, Middlebury, Trinity, Tufts, Wesleyan, Williams, and "Maine Big Three" rivals Bowdoin and Colby in the Colby-Bates-Bowdoin Consortium. This is one of the oldest football rivalries in the United States.

According to U.S. Rowing, the Women's Rowing Team is ranked first in the NESCAC, and first overall in NCAA Division III rowing in 2016. In the 2015 season, the women's rowing team was the most decorated rowing team in collegiate racing. In 2015, the men's rowing team had the fastest ascension in rankings of any sport in its athletic conference and is the NESCAC Rowing Champion. Bates has the 4th-highest NESCAC title hold, is ranked 5th in its athletic conference and 15th in Division III athletics. As of 2018, the college has graduated a total of 12 Olympians, one of whom won the Olympic gold medal rowing for Canada at the 2008 Beijing Olympics. The all-time leader of the Chase Regatta is Bates with a total of 14 wins, followed by Colby's five wins, concluding with Bowdoin's two wins.

In April 2005, the college's athletic program was ranked top 5% of national athletics programs. The men's squash team won the national championships in 2015, and 2016, with the winning student being the first in the history of the athletic conference, to be named the All American all four years he played for the college. The men's track field is the first team in the history of Maine to have seven consecutive wins of the state championship, a feat completed in 2016.

== Sustainability ==
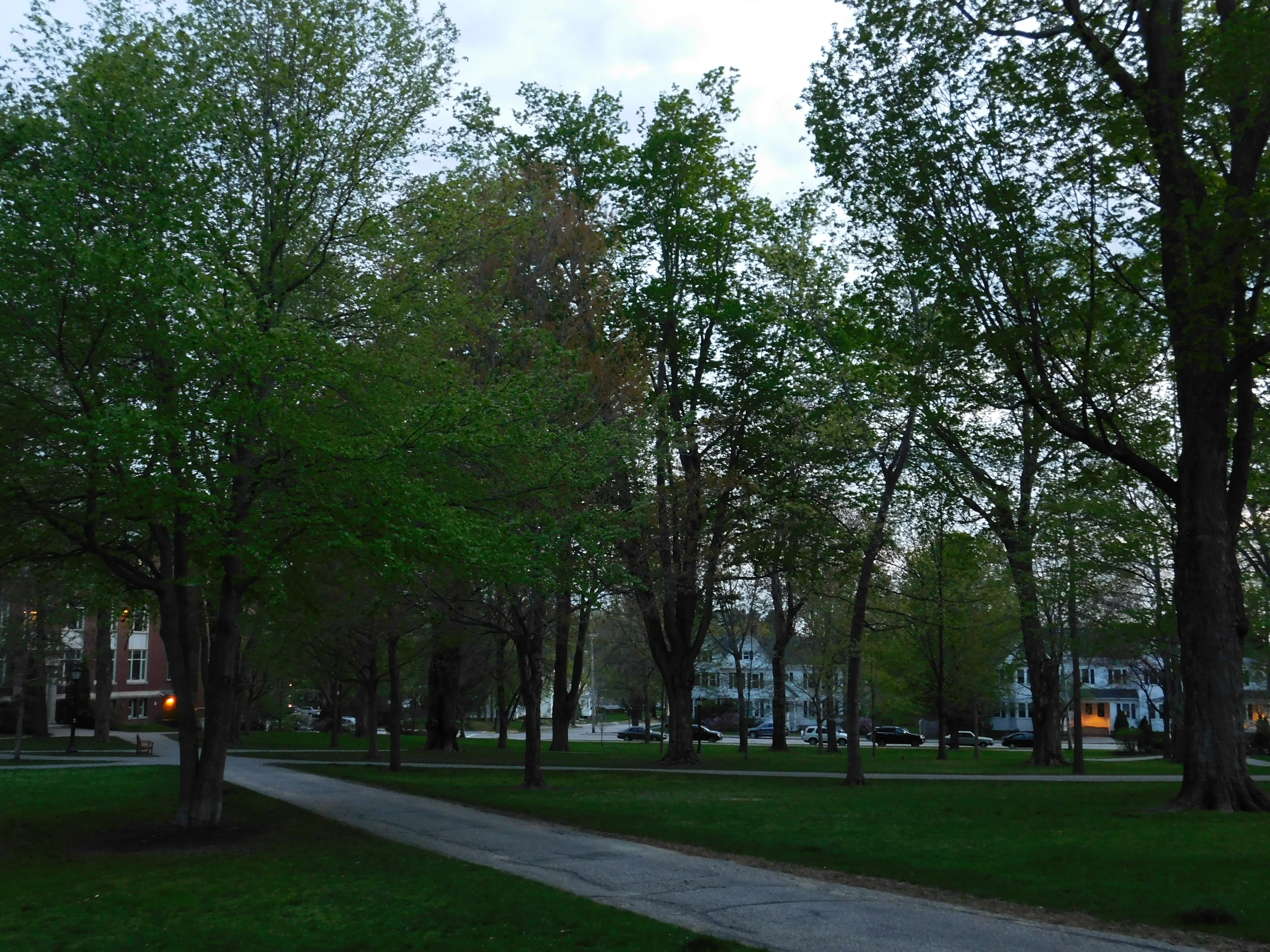
A swath of trees on the Quad, 2018

Bates signed onto the American College and University President's Climate Commitment in 2007. In April 2008, the college completed its dining complex named "The Commons" at a cost of approximately $24 million. The complex is 60,000 square feet, certified LEED Silver, and features occupancy sensors, anti-HCFC refrigerants, natural ventilation, heat islands, and five separate dining areas with almost 70% of the walls being glass paneling. The college also installed a $2.7 million 900 kW hyper-roterized turbine that accounts for nearly one-tenth of the campus' entire energy consumption.

Bates maintains numerous environmental clubs and initiatives such as Green Certification, which recognizes students who commit to sustainable policies and practices, Green Bike, which offers students access to bicycles for use on and off campus for free, and the Bates Action Energy Movement in which students participate in environmental events. The U.S. Environmental Protection Agency (EPA) inducted Bates into its Green Power Leadership Club due to the fact that 96% of energy used on campus is from renewable resources. The college achieved complete carbon neutrality in 2019, as a result of campus-wide conservation efforts and specific initiatives in its implementation plan.

== Administration ==
=== Leadership ===
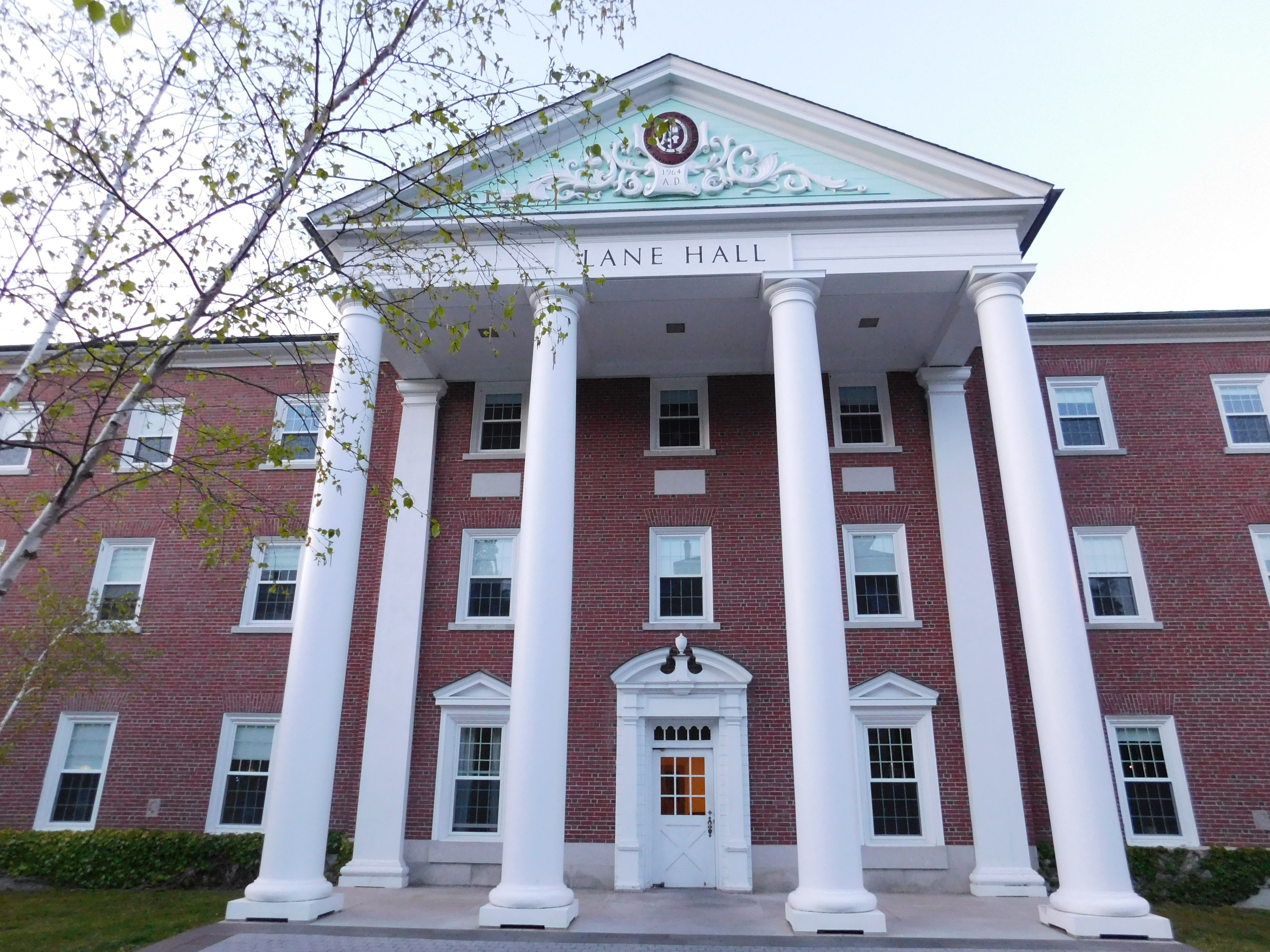
The administrative offices of Bates, Lane Hall, 2014

Bates College is governed by its central administration, led by president Garry Jenkins, who took office in July 2023. There have been nine presidents of Bates College with one interim president. There are 37 members on the Bates College board of trustees. The board chair is CEO of PineBridge Investments, Gregory Ehret ('81).

=== Endowment and fundraising ===
The endowment surpasses the national average, yet has been seen as a laggard compared to its direct peers. During the first half-century of the college, the endowment grew at an exponentially high rate, topping off at $1 million in 1910, as Yale University, then 207 years old, stood at $12 million. "Lackluster fundraising, poor governance, and divestments" from the 1960s to 1980s, "cost Bates hundreds of millions" according to a 2019–20 The Student/BCIC academic study. During the 2008 financial crisis and the Great Recession, the college's endowment lost 31% of market value. The Bates endowment consistently outperformed peers in market returns, particularly against fellow NESCAC colleges and the Ivy League from 2010 to 2018. Its low endowment-to-student ratio increases the college's fee dependency, frequently making Bates one of the most expensive colleges to attend in the country. The college raised around $300 million from 2017 to 2022 as part of a broader capital campaign.

== Notable alumni ==
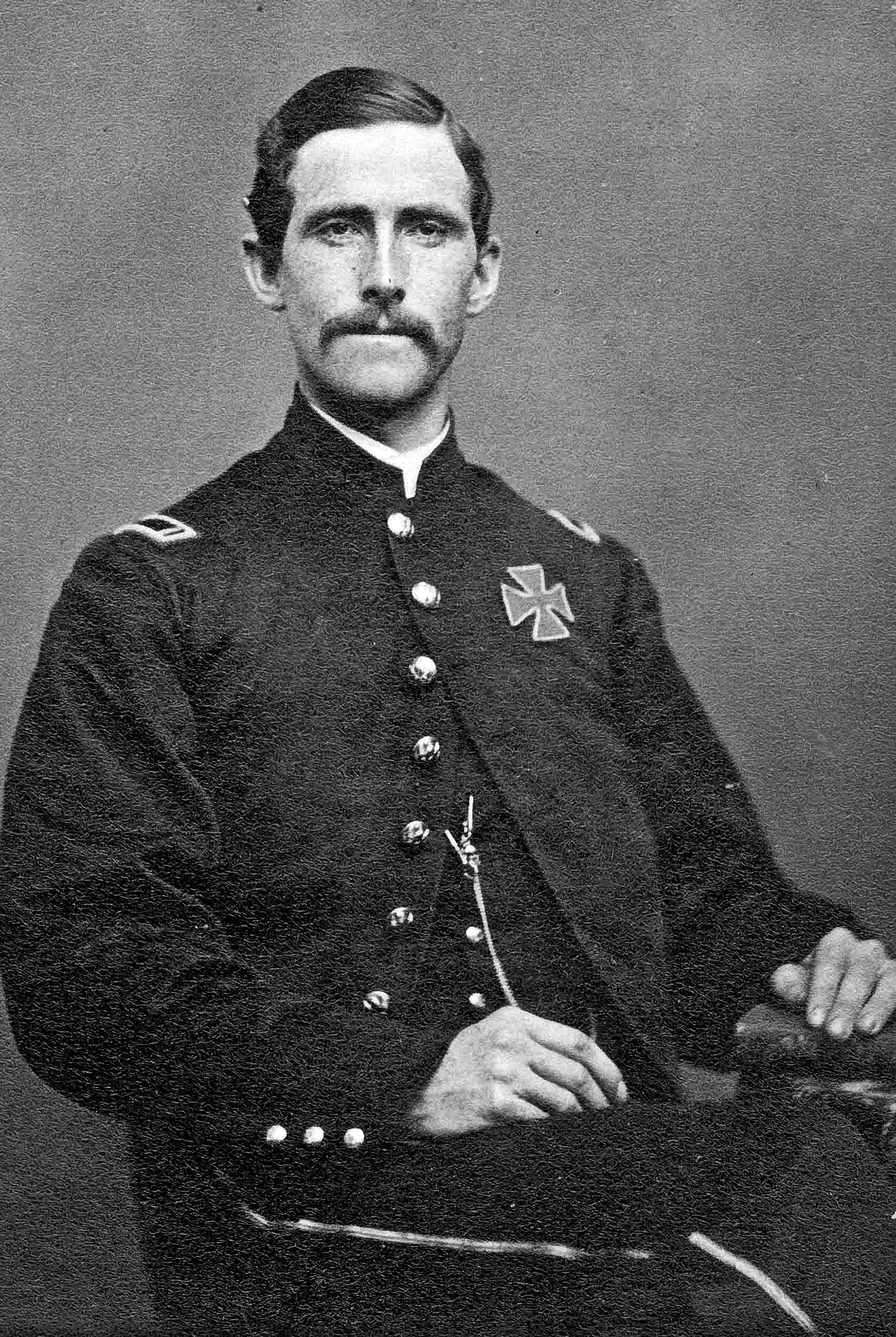
Holman Melcher, American military officer during the American Civil War

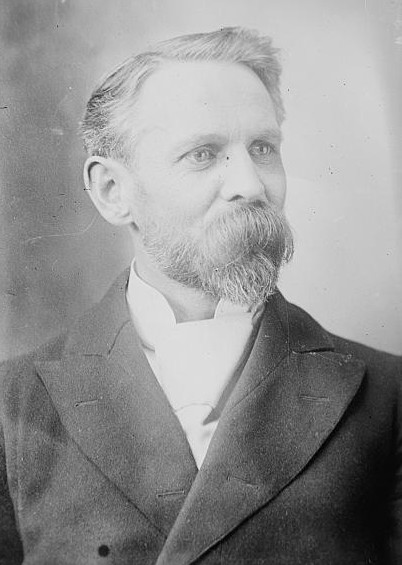
Frank Sandford, Christian cult leader

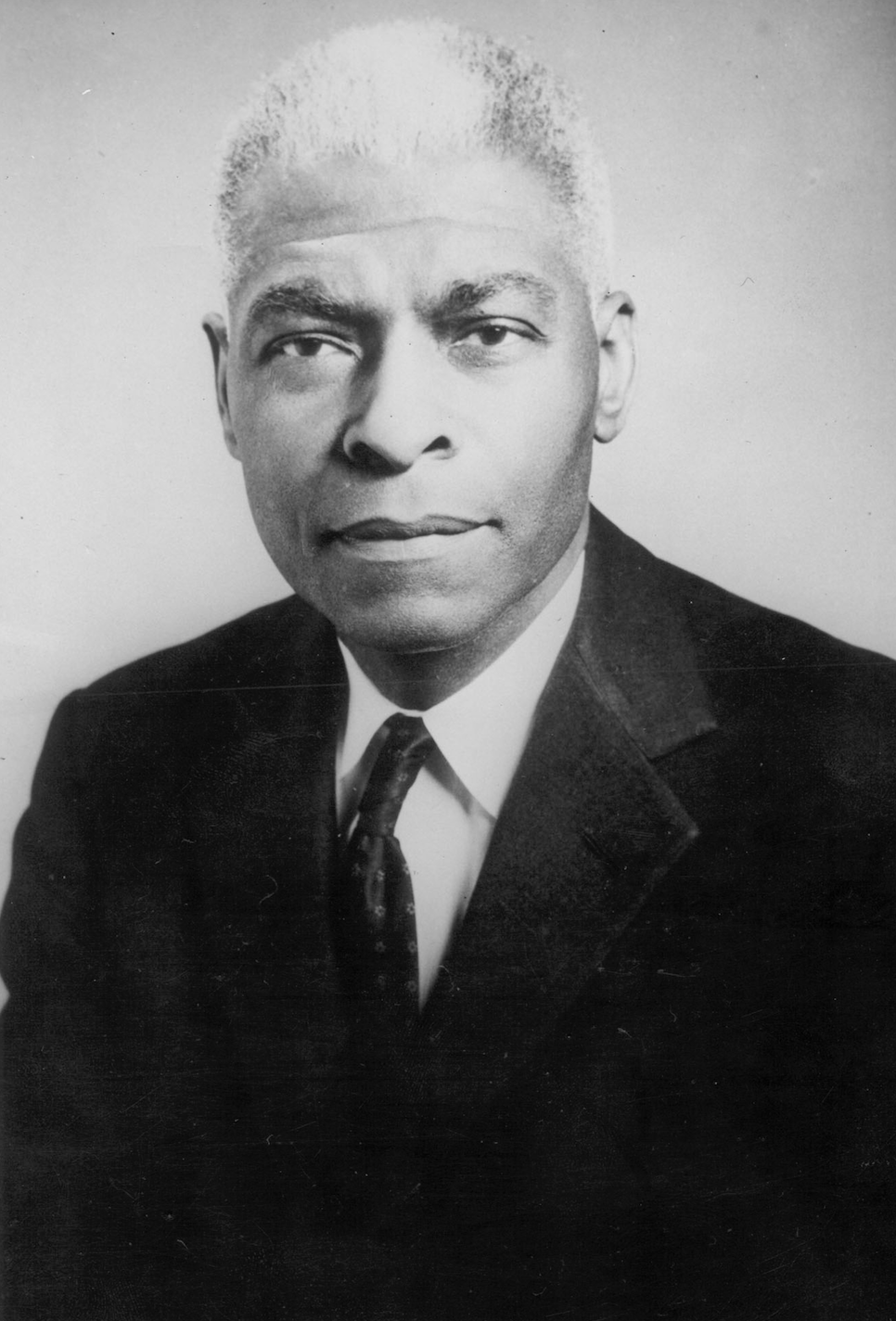
Benjamin Mays, civil rights leader

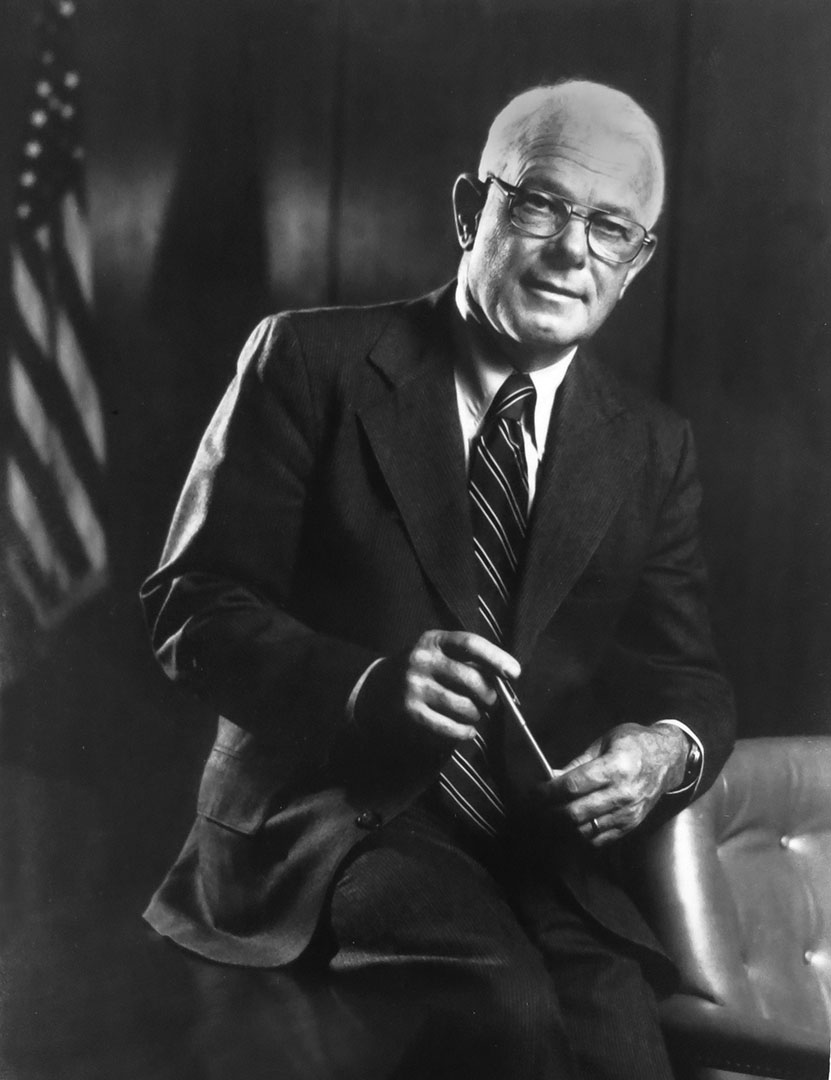
Robert Kinney, former CEO of General Mills

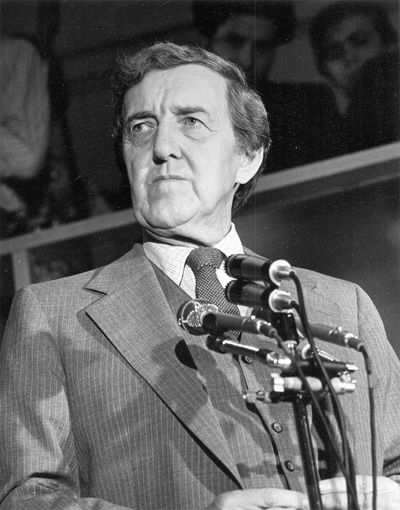
Edmund Muskie, former U.S. Secretary of State and U.S. Senator

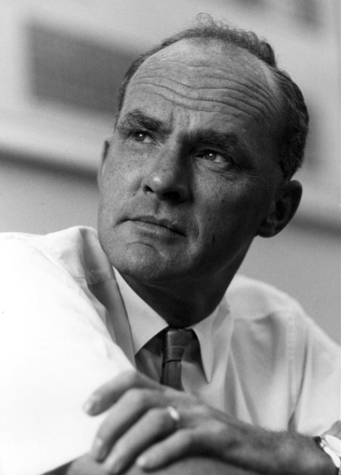
George Hammond, scientist and theoretical chemist

Bates alumni have included leaders in science, religion, politics, the Peace Corps, medicine, law, education, communications, and business; and acclaimed actors, architects, artists, astronauts, engineers, human rights activists, inventors, musicians, philanthropists, and writers. As of 2026, there are 24,000 Bates College alumni. Bates alumni, including faculty, include 86 Fulbright Scholars; 22 Watson Fellows; 5 Rhodes Scholars; as well as 12 members of the U.S. Congress. The college is associated, through alumni and academic staff, with the following intellectual, scientific, and social contributions to human advancement, including laying the foundations of braille typography (Frank Haven Hall), "The Kingdom" (Frank Sandford), the American civil rights movement (Benjamin Mays), basketball's fast break (Frank Keaney), the Boston Red Sox (Harry Lord, Charles Small), the fractional quantum Hall effect (Steven Girvin), and organic photochemistry (George Hammond).

In national and international government, alumni of the college include the 58th U.S. Secretary of State, Edmund Muskie (1936), U.S. Attorney General Robert F. Kennedy (1944), and Clerk of the Supreme Court of the United States John F. Davis (1928). As of November 2018, the college has had 12 United States Congress members among its alumni: John Swasey (1859), Daniel McGillicuddy (1881), Carroll Beedy (1903), Charles Clason (1911), Donald Partridge (1914), Edmund Muskie (1936), Frank Coffin (1940), Robert F. Kennedy (1944), Leo Ryan (1944), Bob Goodlatte (1974), Ben Cline (1994), and Jared Golden (2011). In state government, Bates alumni have led all three political branches in Maine, graduating two Chief Justices of the Maine Supreme Court, two Maine Governors, and multiple leaders of both state houses. Notable military people include Brevet Major Holman Melcher (1862), as well as Medal of Honor recipients Frederick Hayes (1861), Josiah Chase (1861), Joseph F. Warren (1862), Lewis Millet (1943), Aaron Daggett (1860), and James Porter (1863).

Bates alumni in business, finance, and economics include General Mills CEO Robert Kinney (1939), Fidelity Fund managing director Barry Greenfield (1956), Analysis Group founder Bruce Stangle (1970), Merrill Lynch CFO Joseph Willett (1973), Japonica Partners CEO Paul Kazarian (1978), L Catterton CEO Michael Chu (1980), Cubist Pharmaceuticals CEO Michael Bonney (1980), National Bank of Canada CEO Louis Vachon (1983), and Affiliated Managers Group CFO Darrell Crate (1989). In literature, music, journalism, television, and film, the following attended Bates: documentarian Amy Geller (1996), actors Jeffery Lynn (1930), John Shea (1970), Maria Bamford (1990–92), Bryant Gumbel (1970), writers Jeffrey K. Tulis (1972), Elizabeth Strout (1977), Lisa Genova (1992), and Brian McGrory (1984) and musician Corey Harris (1991). Bates counts 12 Olympian alumni: Vaughn Blanchard (1912), Harlan Holden (1913), Ray Buker (1922), Art Sager (1926), Arnold Adams (1933), Nancy Fiddler (1978), Mike Ferry (1997), Justin Freeman (1998), Andrew Byrnes (2005), Hayley Johnson (2006), Emily Bamford (2015), and Dinos Lefkaritis (2019).

== See also ==
- Liberal arts colleges in the United States
- List of colleges and universities in Maine
