= Bates College Museum of Art =

Coordinates: 44°06′30″N 70°12′07″W

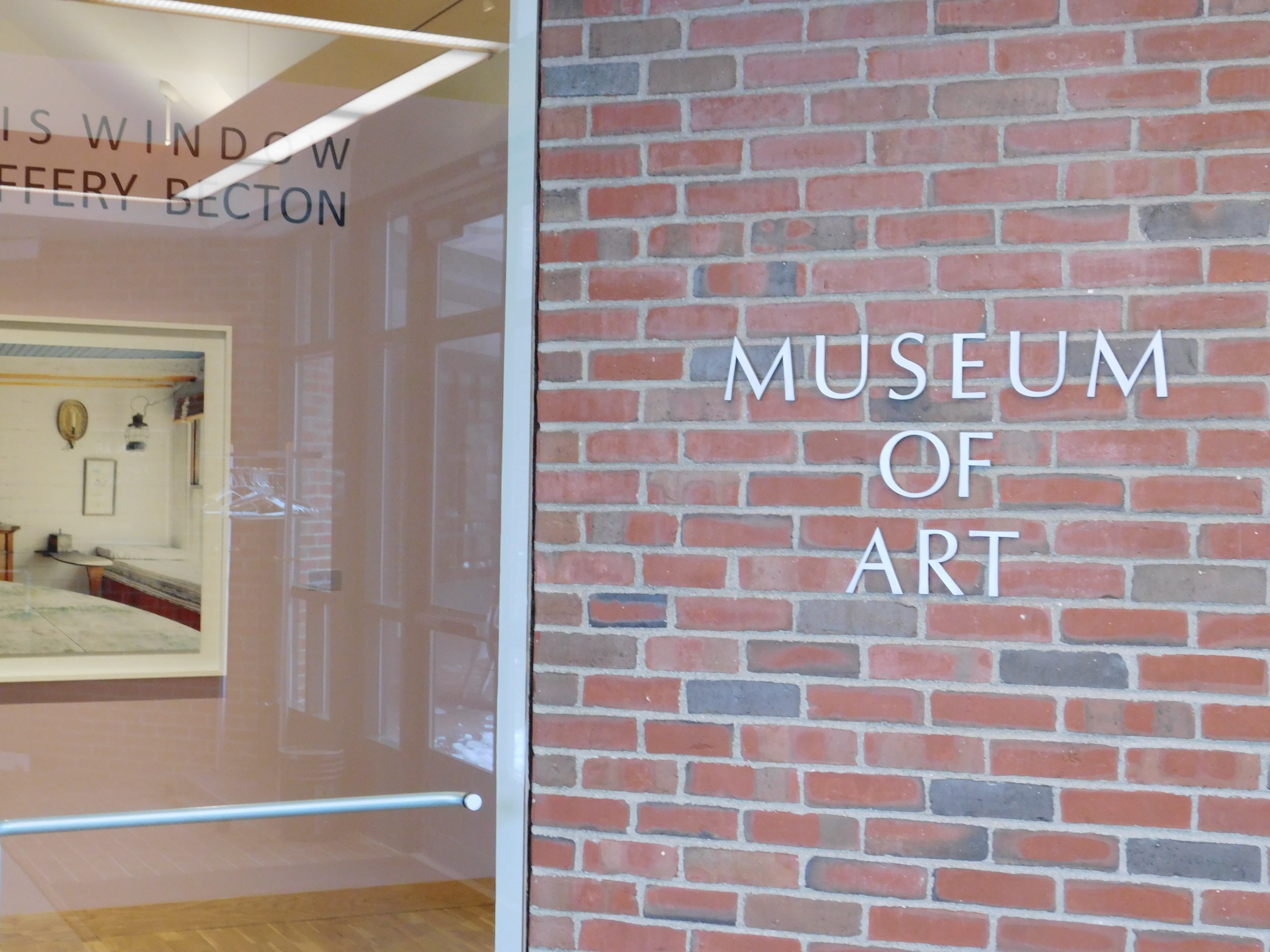
- Former name: Treat Gallery (until 1986)
- Established: October 7, 1955; 70 years ago
- Location: 75 Russell Street; Lewiston, Maine, U.S.
- Type: Art museum
- Collection size: 8,000 – 10,000 (2026)
- Visitors: 19,500 (2026)
- Director: Carrie Cushman
- Owner: Bates College
- Website: bates.edu/museum

The Bates College Museum of Art is an art museum located on the campus of Bates College in Lewiston, Maine. The museum's collection consists of works of art that showcase Maine as well as art from around the world, with a focus on modern and contemporary work. It holds 8,000 pieces and objects of contemporary domestic and international art. The museum offers numerous lectures, artist symposiums, and workshops.

The museum galleries are divided into three sections: the larger Upper Gallery, the smaller Lower Gallery, and the Synergy Gallery which is primarily used for student exhibits and research. The museum receives nearly 20,000 visitors annually.

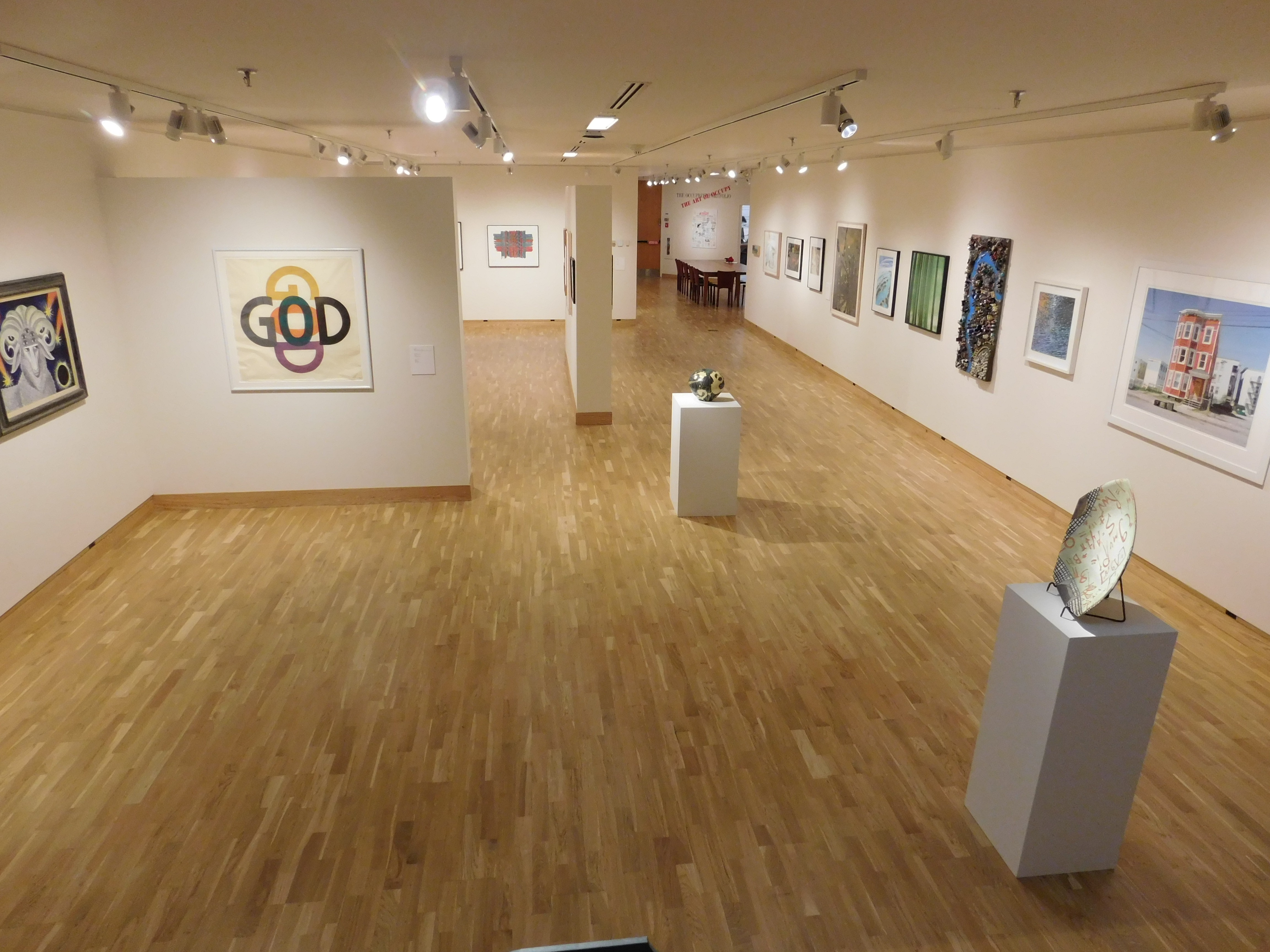
The museum's lower gallery in 2015

== History ==
The museum was founded in 1955 as the Treat Gallery in the newly constructed Pettigrew Building at Bates College. Norma Berger, the niece of Marsden Hartley, a notable Maine artist, donated a large collection at the founding of the museum. In 1986, the gallery moved to the new Olin Arts Center and adopted its current name. After the renovation and installation, the new and expanded space enabled the museum to organize major scholarly exhibitions of contemporary and historic artists. Over the past decade, the collection has grown to collect more art pieces of all mediums and support educational curriculum across disciplines.

Since 2025, Carrie Cushman has overseen the museum as its director.

== Collections and notable exhibitions ==
As of 2023, it holds over 8,000 objects, including select and growing holdings of contemporary Chinese art, pre-Columbian art, Japanese woodblock prints, and African art. In addition to the original Marsden Hartley Memorial Collection, the museum contains works by many other notable artists. The museum has focused on collecting works of Maine artists.

== Teaching and education ==
The Bates College Museum of Art also offers curricular involvement with both the college and surrounding communities. The college uses the museum's exhibitions and collections to "teach writing skills and visual literacy." In 2015, the Museum developed the Thousand Words Project, a series of videos aimed at elementary through high school students and teachers, which promotes the use of art to improve literacy and writing skills.

== Gallery ==
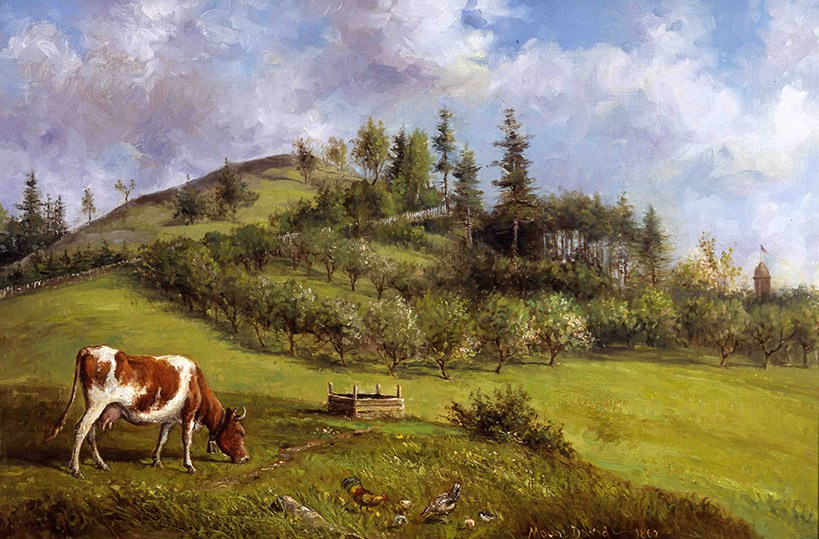
Mount David 1860, painted in 1901 by Delbert Dana Coombs. Mount David is a low mountain on the western edge of the Bates Campus

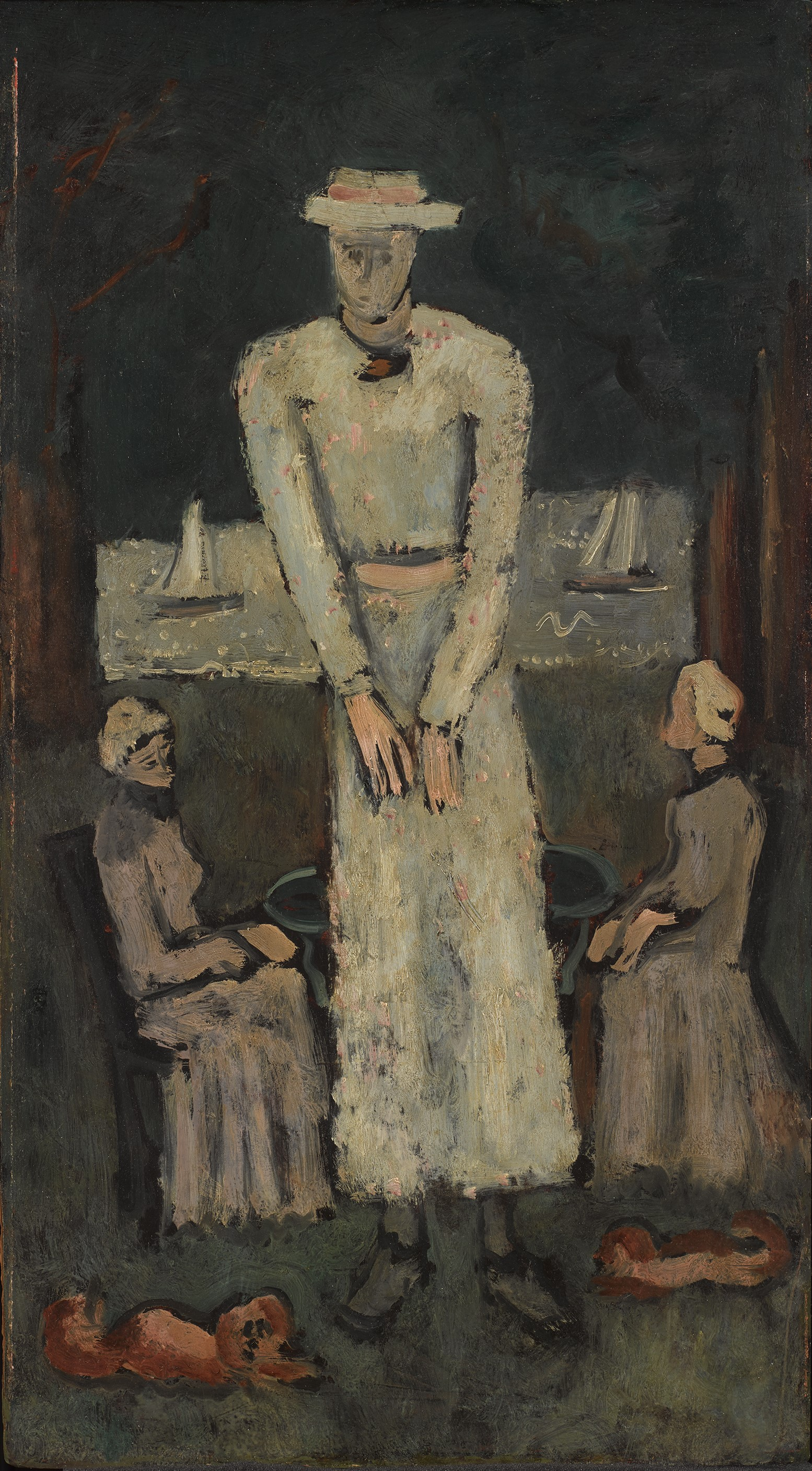
Intellectual Niece, 1939–40, by Marsden Hartley

== See also ==
- List of university museums in the United States
