= William J. Granfield =

American politician

William Joseph Granfield
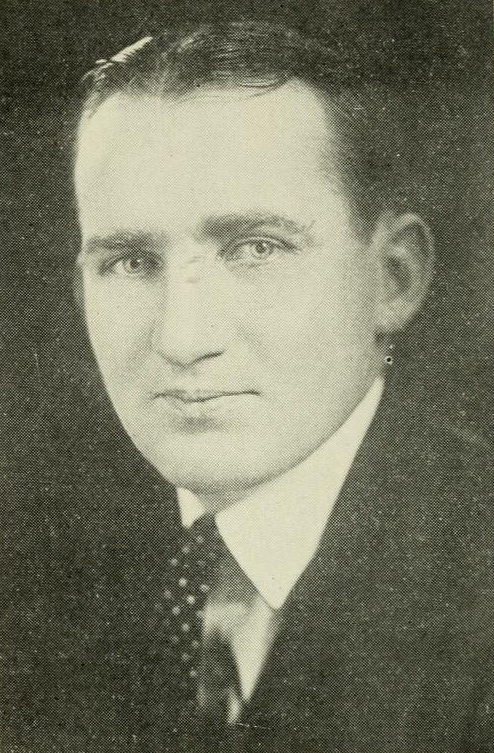

Member of the U.S. House of Representatives from Massachusetts's 2nd district
- In office February 11, 1930 – January 3, 1937
- Preceded by: Will Kirk Kaynor
- Succeeded by: Charles R. Clason

Member of the Massachusetts House of Representatives
- In office 1917–1919

Personal details
- Born: December 18, 1889 Springfield, Massachusetts
- Died: May 28, 1959 (aged 69) Springfield, Massachusetts
- Party: Democratic
- Education: Notre Dame Law School
- Profession: Lawyer

William Joseph Granfield (December 18, 1889 – May 28, 1959) was a United States representative from Massachusetts.

Granfield was born in Springfield on December 18, 1889. He attended elementary and high school in Springfield, and graduated from Williston Academy in 1910. In 1913 he received his law degree from the Notre Dame Law School. He was admitted to the bar in 1916 and began to practice in Springfield.

He was a member of Springfield's common council in 1915 and 1916, and served in the Massachusetts House of Representatives from 1917 to 1919. He was a delegate to the State constitutional convention of 1918 and 1919, and a delegate to the Democratic National Conventions every four years from 1924 to 1940.

He was elected as a Democrat to the Seventy-first Congress to fill the vacancy caused by the death of William K. Kaynor. He was reelected to the Seventy-second, Seventy-third, and Seventy-fourth Congresses and served from February 11, 1930 to January 3, 1937.

Granfield was not a candidate for renomination in 1936. He was appointed presiding justice of the district court of Springfield in 1936, and served until his retirement July 27, 1949.

He died in Springfield on May 28, 1959. Interment was at St. Michael’s Cemetery in Springfield.

== See also ==
- 1917 Massachusetts legislature
- 1918 Massachusetts legislature
- 1919 Massachusetts legislature

== Sources ==
- United States Congress. "William J. Granfield (id: G000372)". Biographical Directory of the United States Congress.

U.S. House of Representatives
Preceded by Will Kirk Kaynor	Member of the U.S. House of Representatives from Massachusetts's 2nd congressional district February 11, 1930 – January 3, 1937	Succeeded by Charles R. Clason
