= Charles R. Clason =

American politician, attorney, and educator

Charles Russell Clason
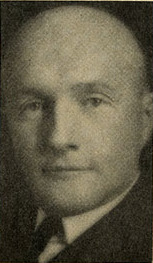

Member of the U.S. House of Representatives from Massachusetts's 2nd district
- In office January 3, 1937 – January 3, 1949
- Preceded by: William J. Granfield
- Succeeded by: Foster Furcolo

Personal details
- Born: September 3, 1890 Gardiner, Maine
- Died: July 7, 1985 (aged 94) Springfield, Massachusetts
- Party: Republican
- Education: Bates College; Georgetown University; University of Oxford

Military service
- Allegiance: United States of America
- Branch/service: United States Army
- Rank: Sergeant major
- Battles/wars: World War I
- Awards: King Albert Medal

Charles Russell Clason (September 3, 1890 – July 7, 1985) was a Republican member of the United States House of Representatives from Massachusetts and an attorney. Clason was born in Gardiner, Maine. He attended Bates College, and received his law degree from Georgetown University. Clason went on to Oxford University as a Rhodes Scholar.

He worked for the Interstate Commerce Commission and the United States Department of Education in 1913 and 1914. He served as a sergeant major in the Coast Artillery in the Army in World War I. He was a member of the Commission for the Relief of Belgium in 1914 and 1915 and was decorated with the King Albert Medal.

Clason was a law instructor at Northeastern University's Springfield, Massachusetts campus from 1920 to 1937. During this time, he served as assistant district attorney of the western district of Massachusetts (1922–1926) and then district attorney (1927–1930).

He was elected to the United States House of Representatives in 1936, and served six consecutive terms. After he lost the 1948 election to Foster Furcolo, Clason became dean of the Western New England College School of Law, located in Springfield, Massachusetts.

In 1988, the Western New England College School of Law honored Clason by naming a speaker series in his honor. The Clason Speaker Series provided a venue for 4-5 legal experts each year to present works-in-progress on current legal topics through lectures.

U.S. House of Representatives
Preceded by William J. Granfield	Member of the U.S. House of Representatives from Massachusetts's 2nd congressional district January 3, 1937 – January 3, 1949	Succeeded by Foster Furcolo
