= George B. Churchill =

American politician (1866–1925)

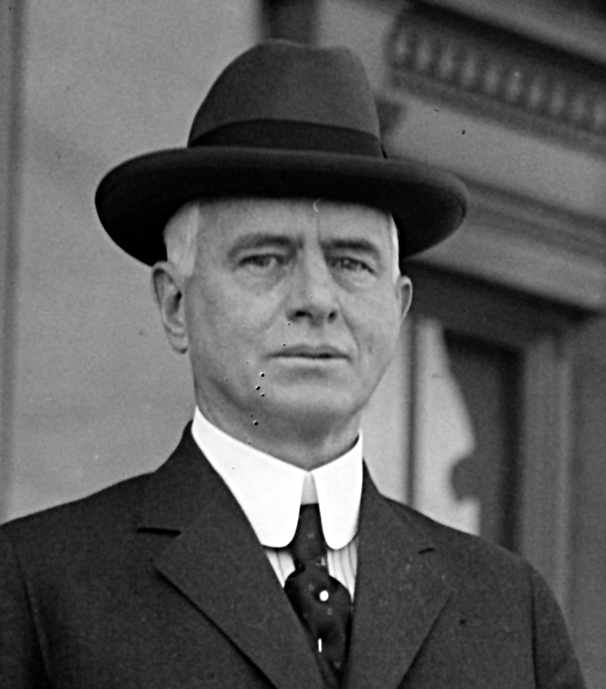
- Churchill in 1925

Member of the U.S. House of Representatives from Massachusetts's 2nd district
- In office March 4, 1925 – July 1, 1925
- Preceded by: Frederick H. Gillett
- Succeeded by: Henry L. Bowles

Member of the Massachusetts Senate
- In office 1917–1919

Personal details
- Born: George Bosworth Churchill; October 24, 1866 Worcester, Massachusetts
- Died: July 1, 1925 (aged 58) Amherst, Massachusetts
- Party: Republican

George Bosworth Churchill (October 24, 1866 – July 1, 1925) was an American politician, a representative from Massachusetts, and an academic and editor.

== Life and career ==
Churchill was born in Worcester, Massachusetts to Ezra and Myra Jane Churchill and grew up there. He graduated from Amherst College in 1889, where he was a member of Chi Phi fraternity. He taught at Worcester High School until 1892. At this point he moved to Philadelphia and taught in the William Penn Charter School, simultaneously taking a postgraduate course at the University of Pennsylvania 1892–1894.

In 1894, he went to Europe and studied in the University of Strassburg, Germany (now in France), and then attended the University of Berlin, 1895–1897. He returned to the United States and became assistant editor of the Cosmopolitan Magazine in 1897 and 1898; member of the faculty of Amherst College 1898-1925 (as professor of English Literature); moderator of Amherst 1905–1925.

He was member of the State senate 1917–1919; delegate to the State constitutional conventions in 1917 and 1919; elected as a Republican to the Sixty-ninth Congress and served from March 4, 1925, until his death, in Amherst. He was buried in Wildwood Cemetery.

== See also ==
- 1917 Massachusetts legislature
- 1918 Massachusetts legislature
- 1919 Massachusetts legislature
- List of members of the United States Congress who died in office (1900–1949)

U.S. House of Representatives
Preceded by Frederick H. Gillett	Member of the U.S. House of Representatives from Massachusetts's 2nd congressional district March 4, 1925 – July 1, 1925	Succeeded by Henry L. Bowles
