= Mount David (Maine) =

Mountain summit in Maine, United States

Coordinates: 44.1060°N 70.2084°W

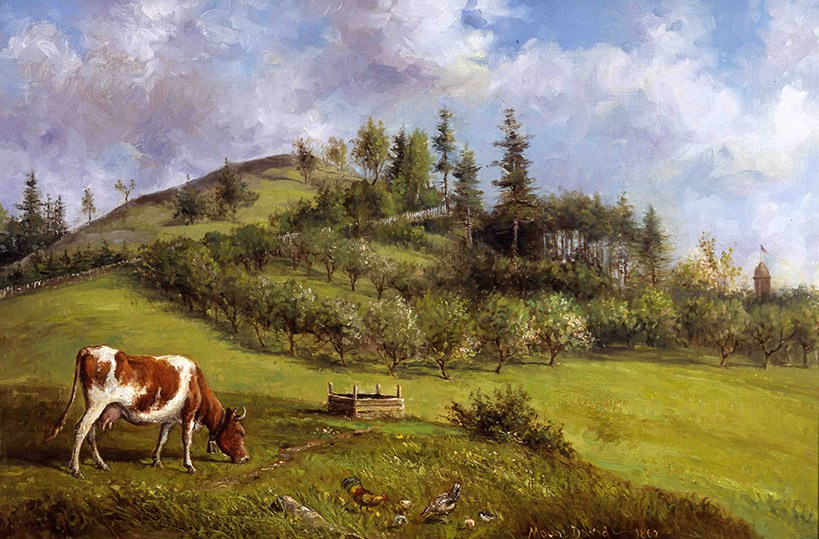
Mount David 1860, painted in 1901 by Delbert Dana Coombs, a painting currently in the Bates College Museum of Art

Mount David (also known as Mount Davis, Davis Mountain, and David's Mountain) is a rocky summit in Lewiston, Maine, on the campus of Bates College. It is one of the highest points in Lewiston at 381 feet and offers views of the White Mountains including Mount Washington on a clear day.

== History ==
The peak was originally named David's Mountain after David Davis (1775-1851) son of one of Lewiston's first settlers, Amos Davis (1741-1815), a Quaker, who was an early supporter of education and churches in the area. David Davis purchased the mountain with 100 surrounding acres for $5 in 1803. Davis and his father are buried in the Davis family cemetery near Frye Street. At the opening ceremony of College in 1857, a pastor told the new students that if David Davis were still living he would have exhorted them to “go up that mountain, where you will obtain a view of our united villages. Make your principles as firm as the granite base on which the mountain rests.” Several of Davis' descendants attended Bates. In the 1860s, Davis' heirs, including Mrs. Archibald Wakefield and Mrs. John M. Frye donated a site on the summit of Mount David to Bates College to build an observatory. The City of Lewiston allocated $5,000 to build a road to the observatory once it was constructed. The observatory was never completed on the summit of Mount David as planned, but in 1929 Stephens Observatory was built nearby atop Carnegie Science building.

Various organizations in the Lewiston area have used the name Mount David. The Mount David Summit is an annual academic presentation of student work at Bates College and the Mount David Society is a college giving society. There is also a Mount David Housing group and in the past, a Mount David Shakespeare Club at Bates and a Mount David Lodge in Lewiston.

== See also ==
- History of Bates College
