= Stephens Observatory =

Observatory in Maine, US

Coordinates: 44°06′18″N 70°12′16″W

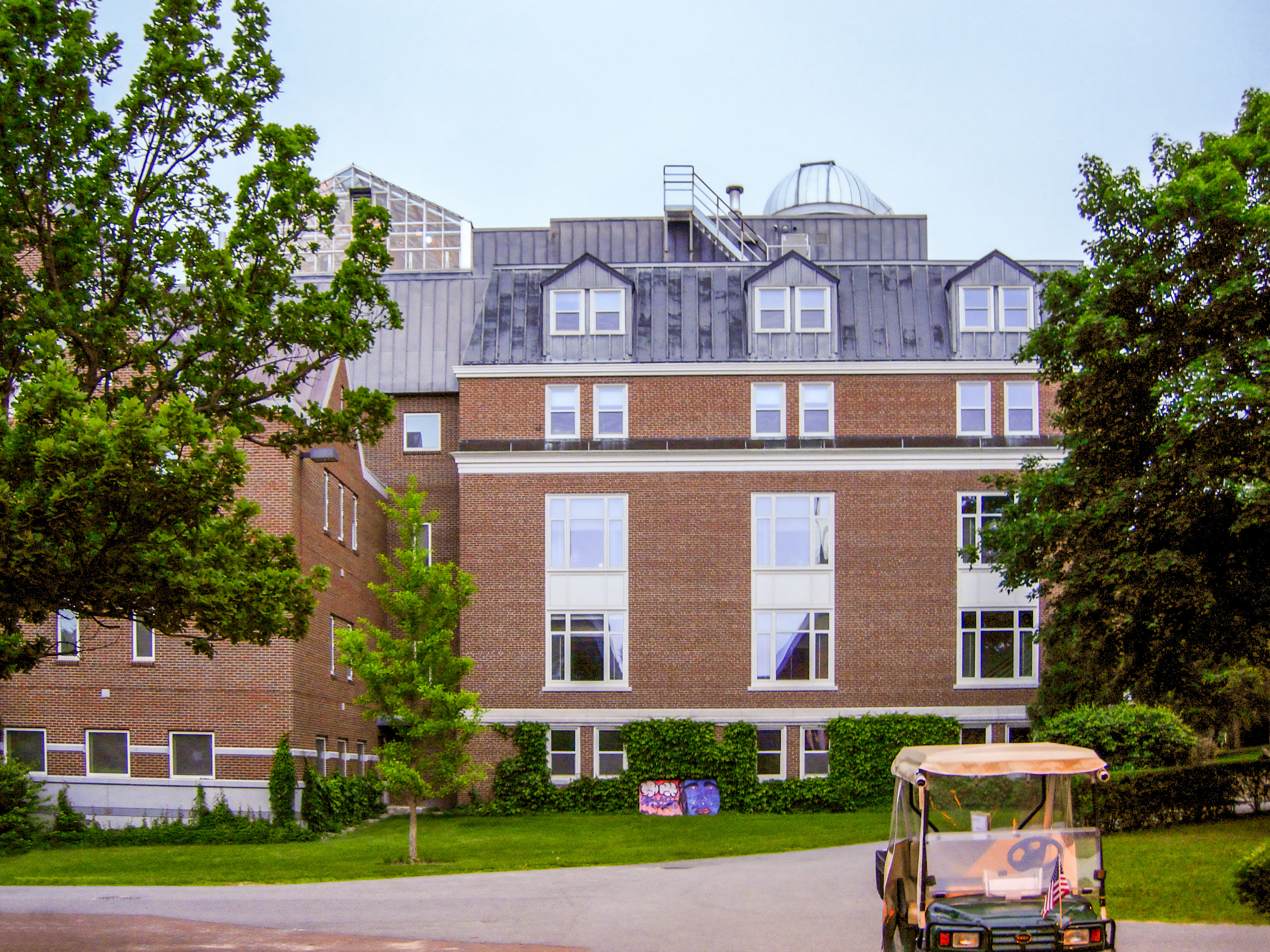
The Stephens Observatory atop Carnegie Science Hall, in 2007

The Stephens Observatory is located atop the Carnegie Science Building at Bates College in Lewiston, Maine. It houses a 12 in (30 cm) Newtonian reflecting telescope, built by Roscoe G. Stephens of Kennebunk, Maine, and donated to the College in 1929. It is used mainly as a teaching facility for upper-level astronomy classes. The observatory has a modern tracking system and electronic drive mechanism.

== History ==
Bates' observatory was initially going to be built on top of nearby Mount David in Lewiston. In the 1860s, Bates Catalogues first mentioned plans to build an observatory on the outcropping. The land encompassing Mount David was given by the heirs of David Davis in the 1800s to be used specifically for an observatory. Bates Student articles from the 1870s–1910s and Catalogues continuously refer to plans to build an observatory at Bates. Many of these articles featured pictures of the future observatory. It was not until 1929 that the Stephens Observatory was actually completed on Carnegie Science Building. Philanthropist Andrew Carnegie donated the initial funds for the building.

== See also ==
- List of astronomical observatories
