= Will Kirk Kaynor =

American politician

William Kirk Kaynor
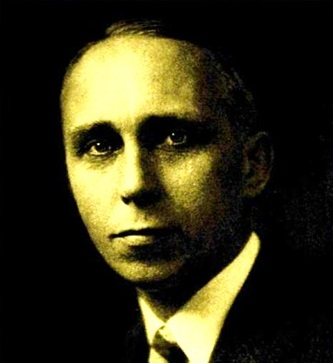

Member of the U.S. House of Representatives from Massachusetts's 2nd district
- In office March 4, 1929 – December 20, 1929
- Preceded by: Henry L. Bowles
- Succeeded by: William J. Granfield

Personal details
- Born: November 29, 1884 Sanborn, Iowa
- Died: December 20, 1929 (aged 45) Washington, D.C.
- Party: Republican
- Spouse: Alice Chapin Reed

William Kirk Kaynor (November 29, 1884 – December 20, 1929) was a United States representative from Massachusetts.

Born in Sanborn, Iowa, Kaynor attended the common schools of Spencer and Clear Lake. In his early youth, he was employed as a drug store clerk in Clear Lake. He later moved to Gann Valley, South Dakota, and herded cattle. He was graduated from Hotchkiss School, Lakeville, Connecticut, in 1908, and from Yale University in 1912. He moved to Springfield, Massachusetts, and engaged in the real estate and insurance business. During the First World War, he attended the officers' training school at Camp Lee, Virginia, from July to November 1918. He was a member of the common council of Springfield from 1920 to 1924, and was the postmaster of Springfield from 1923 to 1928.

He was elected as a Republican to the Seventy-first Congress and served from March 4, 1929, until his death in a United States Army Air Corps airplane accident at Bolling Field in Washington, D.C., on December 20, 1929. It was his first time in an airplane. Interment was in Oak Grove Cemetery, Springfield, Massachusetts.

== See also ==
- List of members of the United States Congress who died in office (1900–1949)

U.S. House of Representatives
Preceded by Henry L. Bowles	Member of the U.S. House of Representatives from Massachusetts's 2nd congressional district March 4, 1929 – December 20, 1929	Succeeded by William J. Granfield
