= Henry L. Bowles =

American politician (1866–1932)

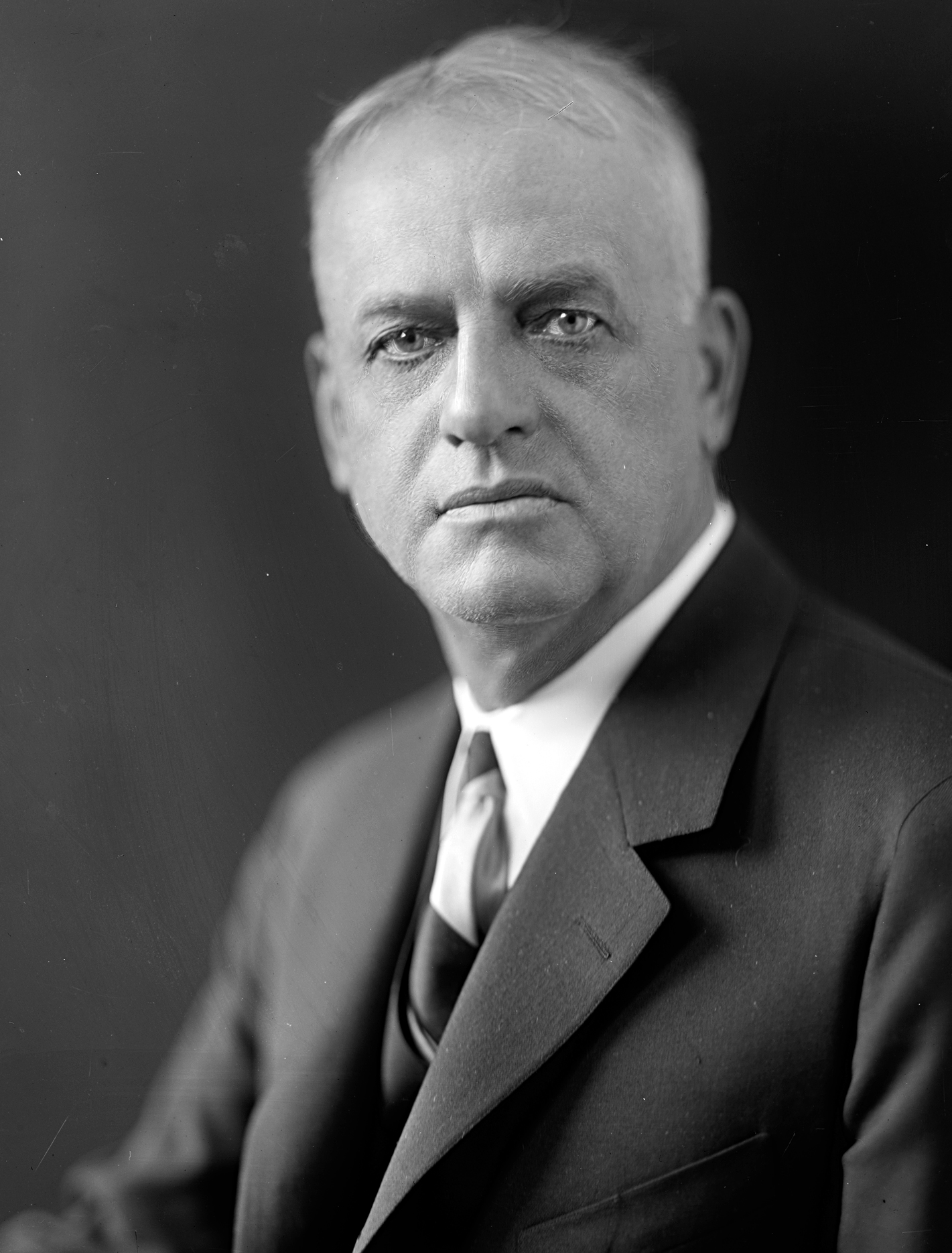

Member of the U.S. House of Representatives from Massachusetts's 2nd district
- In office September 29, 1925 – March 3, 1929
- Preceded by: George B. Churchill
- Succeeded by: Will Kirk Kaynor

Personal details
- Born: Henry Leland Bowles; January 6, 1866 Athens, Vermont
- Died: May 17, 1932 (aged 66) Springfield, Massachusetts
- Party: Republican
- Spouse: Edna Howard (m. 1908)

Henry Leland Bowles (January 6, 1866 – May 17, 1932) was an American politician who served as a United States representative from Massachusetts.

== Biography ==
Bowles was born in Athens, Vermont on January 6, 1866. He attended the district schools at Kendricks Corner and Vermont Academy. At the age of eighteen, he moved to Osage, Iowa and engaged in agricultural pursuits. He later moved to California, where for four years he worked as lumberjack, rancher, and farmer.

Bowles returned east and settled in Massachusetts, working at various businesses in Waltham, Salem and Lynn. He was a trustee of the Vermont Academy, and moved to Springfield in 1898, where he operated a chain of restaurants.

He married Edna Howard in December 1908.

He was elected a member of the Massachusetts Governor's Council in 1913, 1918 and 1919, and was a delegate to the Republican National Conventions in 1920 and 1924.

He was elected as a Republican to the Sixty-ninth Congress to fill the vacancy caused by the death of George B. Churchill. Bowles was reelected to the Seventieth Congress and served from September 29, 1925 to March 3, 1929. He was not a candidate for renomination in 1928 and resumed his former business pursuits.

In 1928, he purchased the Orange Grove Plantation on Saint Helena Island near Frogmore, Beaufort County, South Carolina.

He died in Springfield May 17, 1932 and was interred in Springfield Cemetery.

Party political offices
Preceded by Frederick Mansfield	Democratic nominee for Treasurer and Receiver-General of Massachusetts; 1915	Succeeded by Henry N. Teague
U.S. House of Representatives
Preceded by George B. Churchill	Member of the U.S. House of Representatives from Massachusetts's 2nd congressional district September 29, 1925 – March 3, 1929	Succeeded by Will Kirk Kaynor
