= Bates-Morse Mountain =

Privately-owned conservation area in Maine

- Location within Maine

Highest point
- Elevation: 928 ft (283 m)
- Coordinates: 43°44′29″N 69°49′25″W

Geography
- Location: Phippsburg, Maine, United States

Climbing
- Easiest route: Hike

Bates-Morse Mountain, located in Phippsburg, Maine, is a conservation area owned by the Bates-Morse Mountain Conservation Area Corporation. The terrain encompasses salt marshes and beach, all lined by dense Maine woods. The entirety of the mountain extends from the Sprague River to the Morse River. Seawall Beach is also along the mountain towards the top. The beaches that stretch along the outline of the mountain, are privately owned but are occasionally used, with permission, by the greater public for research, and recreation.

This conservation area of 600 acres (240 ha) is available to Bates College students for academic, extracurricular, and research purposes. This area is mainly salt marshes and coastal uplands. The college participates in preserving the plants, animals and natural ecosystems within this area as a part of their Community-Engaged Learning Program. Due to overall size, the site is frequently used by other Maine schools such as Bowdoin College for their Nordic Skiing pole walking practices.
