= E. Robert Kinney =

American businessman

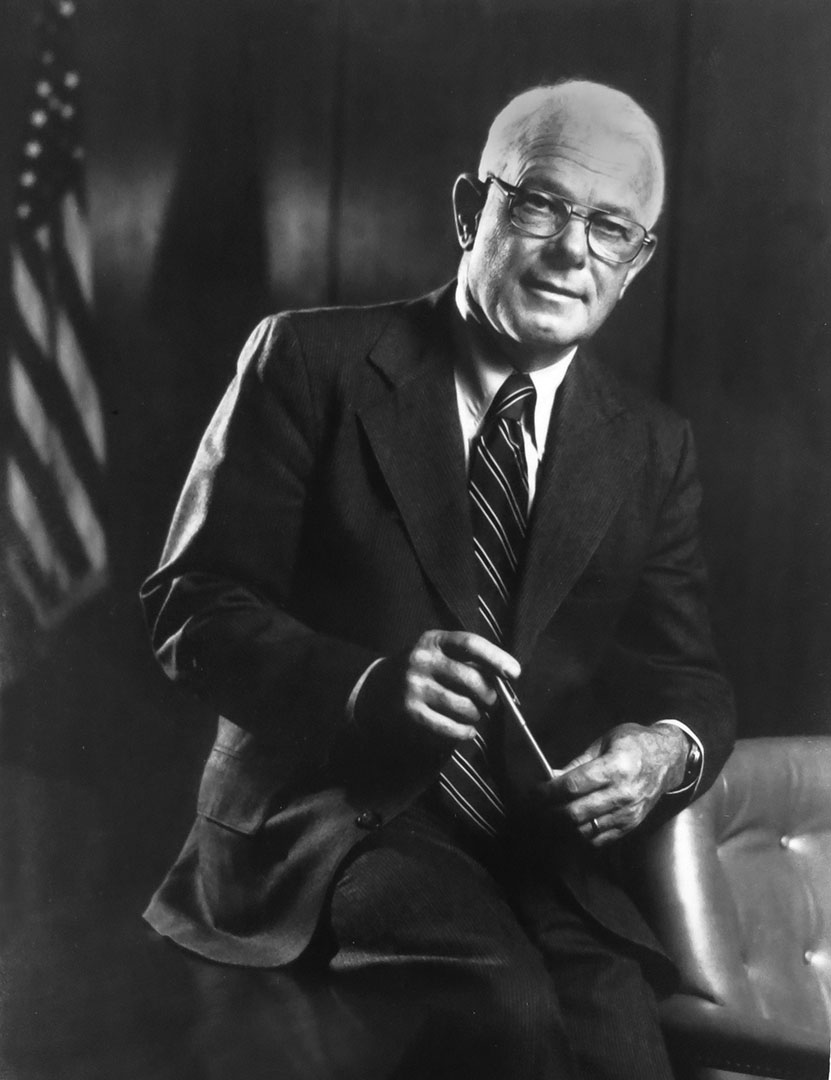
- Kinney in his official corporate portrait

Chief Executive Officer of General Mills
- In office February 1, 1973 – February 1, 1981
- Preceded by: Jean Turmel

Personal details
- Born: Earl Robert Kinney; August 12, 1917 Burnham, Maine, U.S.
- Died: May 2, 2013 (aged 95) Arizona, U.S.
- Education: Bates College
- Profession: Business executive

Robert Kinney (August 12, 1917 – May 2, 2013) was an American businessman, fishery entrepreneur, and philanthropist. He was the chief executive officer of General Mills from 1973 to 1981, previously the chief financial officer. He was appointed Trustee Chair Emeritus of his alma mater, Bates College, in Lewiston, Maine, and served for 27 years.

== Early life and education ==
Earl Robert Kinney was born in Burnham, Maine, on August 12, 1917, to Harry E. and Ethel V. Kinney. He grew up near Pittsfield, Maine, on a farm near the Sebasticook River. His father purchased him a livery stable in Pittsfield where they sold horses. Robert attended Maine Central Institute, graduating in 1935 where he ranked third in his class and played football during his last two years.

Kinney enrolled in Bates College, in Lewiston, Maine, and graduated Phi Beta Kappa in 1939. He graduated with a major in education and a minor in economics. He received an honorary Doctor of Laws degree in 1985. He paid his way through college by "working and living in the home of Lewiston mill industrialist Scott Libbey Sr." and receiving a $500 scholarship from the college. He went on to attend Harvard University briefly, with an intention of becoming a history teacher, but dropped out to pursue business interests in Maine.

== Career ==
=== North Atlantic Packing Co. ===
He began his business career in 1942 with the Works Projects Administration. Kinney began caning crabs in fisheries along the Maine coast. He borrowed $300 from Merrill Trust Co, in Bangor, Maine, to start "buying the crabs for a penny apiece and canning the crab meat" from the catchers in Bangor. He began looking into fisheries and fishing at University of Maine research department, where he discovered that crabs can be hermetically sealed in containers. He began to can crabs and other seafood and sell them to distributors.

He relocated the business to Bar Harbor, Maine, in 1943. He slowly began growing his company by hiring women to can mussels and expanded to newer forms of products including clams, flaked cod and haddock, chowder mix, blueberry jam and sweet orange marmalade. He was soon contracted by U.S. Navy to produce marmalade, he produced 25 tons daily, and delivered them in 8-lb. camouflaged tins.

By the 1950s, Kinney's endeavors took the form of the North Atlantic Packing Co. It soon grew to be a $2 million-a-year business focusing on the distribution of canned crab and other products. The company, at its height, employed 400, largely in Bar Harbor.

=== Gorton's of Gloucester ===
Kinney went on to join Gorton's of Gloucester, a seafood conglomerate based in Gloucester, Massachusetts. He continued his use of emerging food technology to expand the company's fish-based products, including the fish stick. Within two years, he became Vice-President. His work developed into the filet used in McDonald's Filet-O-Fish. He became President of the company in 1958. Under his leadership, the companies earnings "went from $122,000 on sales of $12.1 million in 1958 to $1.44 million on sales of $71.9 million in 1968." Gorton's became the first company to receive the U.S. Department of Agriculture's seal of approval on its frozen seafood products.

=== General Mills ===
In 1968, General Mills acquired Gorton's and appointed Kinney as the head of operations. He moved to the company's headquarters in Minneapolis, Minnesota. Kinney became the chief financial officer in 1969 and was appointed chief executive officer in 1973. During his tenure as CEO, the company's annual sales reached $5 billion (from $3 billion), and its employment grew from 62,000 to 71,000.

Kinney became the CEO of IDS Mutual Fund Group for most of the 1980s. Kinney stepped down from CEO in 1921 and retired from business the following year.

=== Trustee of Bates ===
He was appointed Trustee Chair Emeritus of his alma mater, Bates College, in Lewiston, Maine and served for 27 years. As a trustee, he supported the construction and development Pettengill Hall (built in 1999), and played a key role in establishing the foundation grant funding for the Olin Arts Center (built in 1986) and "established an endowed professorship in history and a scholarship fund." He served for nearly two decades as Chairman of Trustees.

== Death and legacy ==
Kinney died in Arizona on May 2, 2013, at his second home. On his death he was the most generous donor to his alma mater. He was awarded the Benjamin Elijah Mays Medal, the highest award by the college.
