= List of Bates College people =

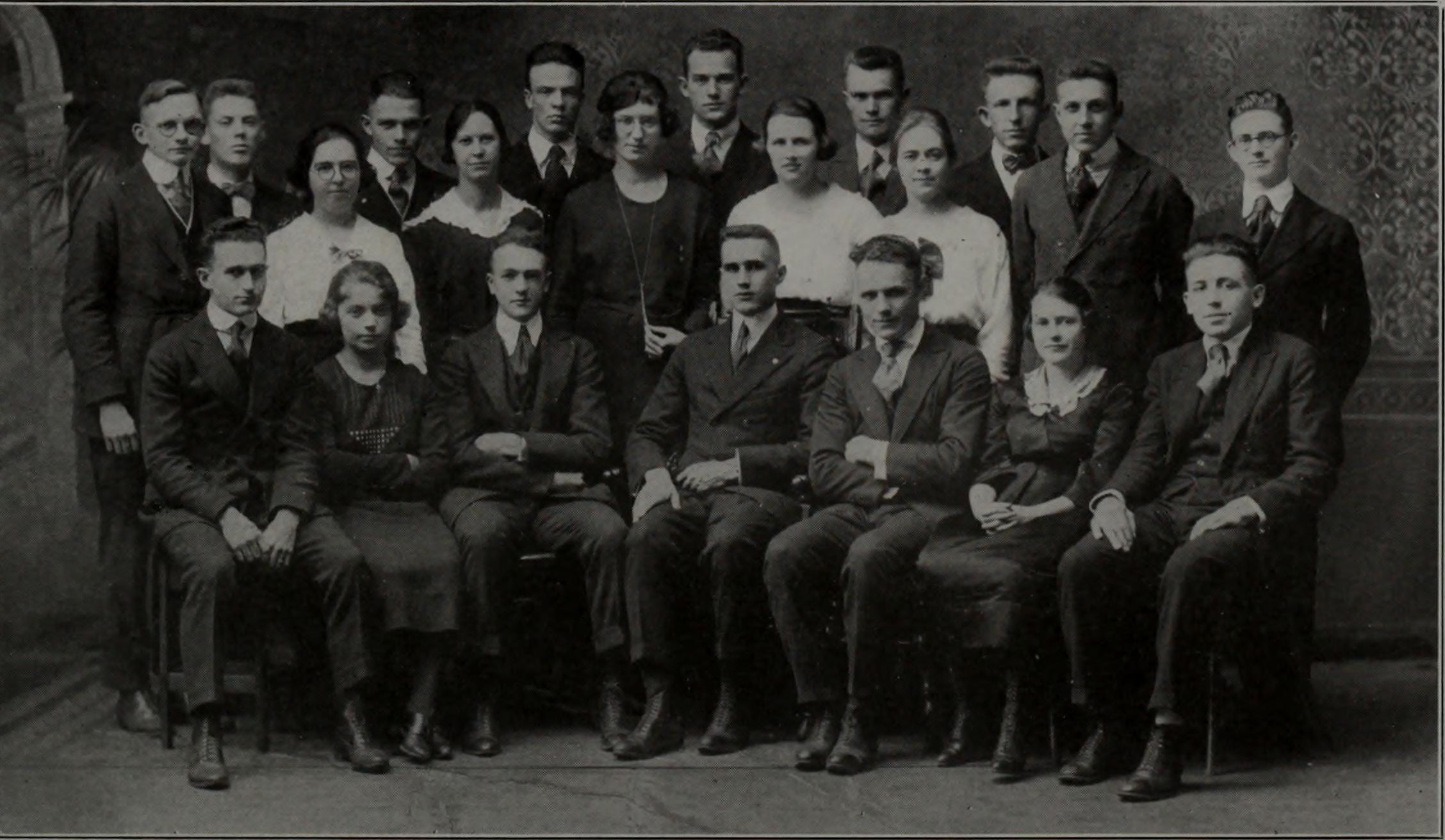
Members of the Brooks Quimby Debate Council in 1921, named after Brooks Quimby ('18), who served as a debate mentor to Robert F. Kennedy ('44) and Edmund Muskie ('36)

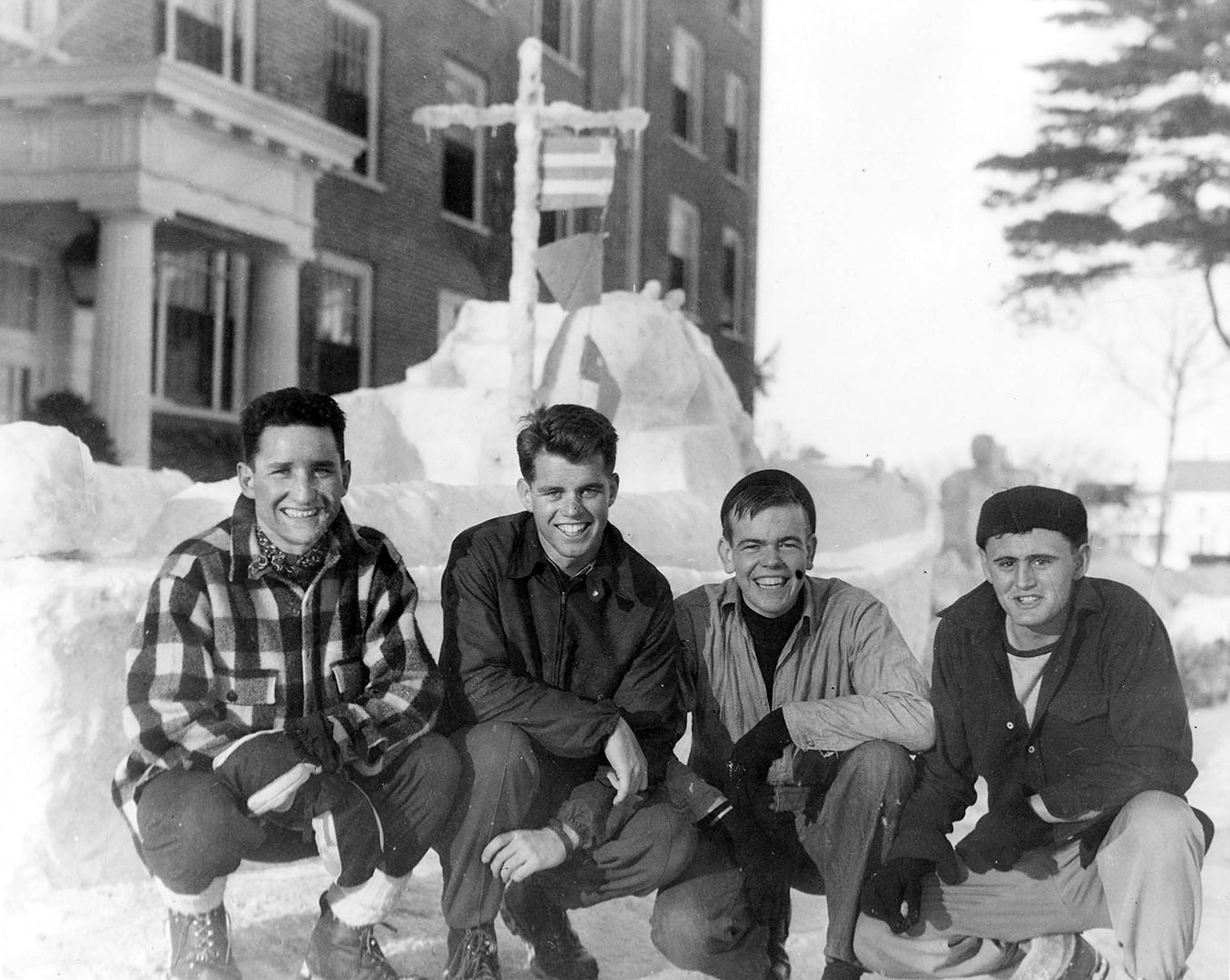
Many seaman apprentices studied at Bates as a part of the V-12 Naval Program. Robert F. Kennedy (second from left), graduated in 1944 with Leo Ryan (not pictured).

This list of notable people associated with Bates College includes matriculating students, alumni, attendees, faculty, trustees, and honorary degree recipients of Bates College in Lewiston, Maine. Members of the Bates community are known as "Batesies" or bobcats. As of 2026, there are over 24,000 Bates alumni worldwide. This list also includes students of the affiliated Maine State Seminary, Nichols Latin School, and Cobb Divinity School. In 1915, president George Colby Chase opted to include former students as alumni in "appreciation of their loyalty". Affiliates of the college include 86 Fulbright Scholars, 22 Watson Fellows, and 5 Rhodes Scholars. Bates has been the fictional alma mater of various characters in American popular culture. Notable fictional works to feature the college include Ally McBeal (1997), The Sopranos (1999), and The Simpsons (2015), among others.

The college counts 12 members of the United States Congress – 2 Senators and 10 members of the House of Representatives – among its alumni. In state government, Bates alumni have led all three political branches in Maine, graduating two Chief Justices of the Maine Supreme Court, two Maine Governors, and multiple leaders of both state houses. Bates has graduated 12 Olympians. More than 20 universities have been led by Bates alumni.

This list uses the following notation:

- B.A. or unmarked years – recipient of Bachelor of Arts either at the Maine State Seminary or Bates
- B.S. – recipient of Bachelor of Science
- B.S.E. – recipient of Bachelor of Science in Engineering from an affiliated engineering school with Bates
- V-12 – recipient of the V-12 Degree through the college's V-12 Navy College Training Program
- S.T.B. – recipient of Sacrae Theologiae Baccalaureus from the college's defunct Cobb Divinity School, which merged with Bates' religion department in 1908

== Notable graduates ==
=== Arts and letters ===
==== Literature and poetry ====
| Name | Class year | Notability | Degree | Reference |
|---|---|---|---|---|
| E. L. Mayo | Class of 1924 | Poet; winner of the 1982 American Book Award | B.A. | |
| Gladys Hasty Carroll | Class of 1925 | Author of As the Earth Turns; received an honorary D.L.L (1945) | B.A. | |
| Dorothy Clarke Wilson | Class of 1925 | Author of The Prince of Egypt, a source for the Academy Award–winning film The Ten Commandments | B.A. | |
| Carleton Mabee | Class of 1936 | Author; won the 1944 Pulitzer Prize | B.A. | |
| Owen Dodson | Class of 1936 | Poet and playwright of the Harlem Renaissance | B.A. | |
| Robert Rimmer | Class of 1939 | Author of The Harrad Experiment | B.A. | |
| Nicholas Basbanes | Class of 1965 | Author of On Paper | B.A. | |
| Ann Turner | Class of 1967 | Children's author and poet; published over 150 works | B.A. | |
| Pamela Alexander | Class of 1970 | Poet and professor at Oberlin College; winner of the 1985 Yale Poet Award | B.A. | |
| Lisa Genova | Class of 1992 | Author of bestsellers Still Alice and Left Neglected | B.A. | |
| Carrie Jones | Class of 1993 | Author of the Need series, featured on New York Times Best Seller List | B.A. | |
| Natasha Friend | Class of 1994 | Author of the award-winning young adult novels Perfect, Lush, and Bounce | B.A. | |
| Elizabeth Strout | Class of 1977 | Author of Amy and Isabelle, Abide with Me, and Olive Kitteridge; winner of the 2009 Pulitzer Prize | B.A. | |

==== Journalism and nonfiction ====
| Name | Class year | Notability | Degree | Reference |
|---|---|---|---|---|
| Louis B. Costello | Class of 1898 | President of the Lewiston Evening Journal and The Lewiston Daily Sun (1945–1959); received an honorary LL.D. (1952) | B.A. | |
| Emerson Baker | Class of 1980 | American historian and archaeologist on the PBS show Colonial House | B.A. | |
| Jon Marcus | Class of 1982 | Author, journalist; editor of Boston Magazine; member of the adjunct faculty at Boston College and Boston University | B.A. | |
| Brian McGrory | Class of 1984 | Editor-in-chief of The Boston Globe | B.A. | |
| Carolyn Ryan | Class of 1986 | Managing editor of The New York Times | B.A. | |
| Michael Brooks | Class of 2009 | Political pundit, writer, comedian and host of The Michael Brooks Show and The Majority Report with Sam Seder | B.A. | |

==== Film and television ====
| Name | Class year | Notability | Degree | Reference |
|---|---|---|---|---|
| Jeffery Lynn | Class of 1930 | Golden Age of Hollywood actor starred in 36 films including Million Dollar Baby, The Roaring Twenties, A Letter to Three Wives, andHometown Story | B.A. | |
| Doug White | Class of 1967 | NBC television lead anchor, for which he won an Emmy Award | B.A. | |
| John Shea | Class of 1970 | Actor, writer, and director; starred in Lois & Clark: The New Adventures of Superman; played Harold Waldorf, Blair Waldorf's father on Gossip Girl (2007–12) | B.A. | |
| Bryant Gumbel | Class of 1970 | Television journalist; 15-year co-host of NBC's The Today Show (1982–1997) and CBS's The Early Show | B.A. | |
| John Carrafa | Class of 1976 | Dancer and choreographer; best known as a two-time Tony Award-nominated choreographer of Broadway musicals Urinetown and Into The Woods and the Media Choreography Honors Award winner for the Robert Zemeckis film The Polar Express | B.A. | |
| David Chokachi | Class of 1990 | Actor and writer; starred in Baywatch and Witchblade | B.A. | |
| Corey Harris | Class of 1991 | Anthropologist and blues musician; featured in the 2003 PBS television mini-series The Blues | B.A. | |
| Maria Bamford | Class of 1994 | Actress and stand-up comedian, creator of Netflix's Lady Dynamite; won the 2014 American Comedy Award | 1990-92 | |
| Andrew Baron | Class of 1994 | Founder of Know Your Meme and Rocketboom | B.A. | |
| Daniel Stedman | Class of 2001 | Youngest filmmaker ever invited to the Berlin International Film Festival | B.A. | |

==== Music ====
| Name | Class year | Notability | Degree | Reference |
|---|---|---|---|---|
| Alice Swanson Esty | Class of 1925 | Soprano; arts patron; donated her collection of music manuscripts to Bates College in 1994 and 1995 | B.A. | |
| Eric Chasalow | Class of 1977 | Composer and professor at Brandeis University; 1985 John Simon Guggenheim Fellowship and multiple awards from American Academy of Arts and Letters | B.A. | |
| Mark Erelli | Class of 1996 | Singer-songwriter | B.A. | |
| Alisa Amador | Class of 2018 | Singer-songwriter; winner of the 2022 NPR Tiny Desk Contest | B.A. | |

==== Art, architecture, and design ====
| Name | Class year | Notability | Degree | Reference |
|---|---|---|---|---|
| William Miller | Class of 1891 | Chief design officer appointed to steel magnate Andrew Carnegie; built the Gerald Hotel, the Auburn Public Library, the Waterville Public Library and other buildings in the New England area | B.A. | |
| Kate Gilmore | Class of 1997 | Fine artist | B.A. | |

=== Government ===
Note: alumni who have served in multiple political offices are noted in all relevant sections for continuity

==== U.S. cabinet-ranked officials ====
Although Bates alumni have served in a variety of capacities in the U.S. federal government, namely in executive departments and agencies, the following have served in cabinet-level positions, advising the executive branch of the United States in one form or another. Other alumni–serving in secondary federal capacities–are catalogued in the succeeding section.

| Name | Class year | Notability | Degree | Reference |
|---|---|---|---|---|
| Edmund Muskie | Class of 1936 | United States secretary of state (1980–1981) | B.A. | |
| Robert F. Kennedy | Class of 1944 | United States attorney general (1961–1964) | V-12 | |

==== Federal officials and ambassadors ====
The following catalogues notable officials or ambassadors in American federal government, typically in the executive, judicial, and legislative branches. Alumni who have served in leadership roles in the federal government or in cabinet-level positions are documented in the preceding section; members of the U.S. Congress (along with state government officials) are noted in the succeeding sections.

| Name | Class year | Notability | Degree | Reference |
|---|---|---|---|---|
| John Abbot | Class of 1871 | United States ambassador to Colombia (1899–1913) | B.A. | |
| Fremont Wood | Class of 1881 | United States attorney for Idaho Territory (1889–1894) | B.A. | |
| Meredith Burrill | Class of 1925 | United States Board on Geographic Names executive secretary]] (1943–1973) | B.A. | |
| John F. Davis | Class of 1928 | 14th clerk of the Supreme Court of the United States (1961–1970) | B.A. | |
| Herbert Reiner Jr. | Class of 1936 | United States Foreign Service diplomat who caught Mahatma Gandhi's assassin in 1948 | B.A. | |
| Constance Berry Newman | Class of 1956 | United States assistant secretary of state for African Affairs (2004–2005) | B.A. | |
| Joyce Vance | Class of 1982 | United States attorney for Alabama (2009–2017) | B.A. | |

==== U.S. senators ====
From 1965 to 1968, both Edmund Muskie (1936) and Robert F. Kennedy (1944) served together in the United States Senate, representing Maine and New York, respectively. Many of the following alumni served in leadership positions in the Senate.

| Name | Class year | Notability | Degree | Reference |
|---|---|---|---|---|
| Edmund Muskie | Class of 1936 | United States senator from Maine (1959–1980) | B.A. | |
| Robert F. Kennedy | Class of 1944 | United States senator from New York (1965–1968) | V-12 | |

==== U.S. representatives ====
The first Bates alumni to serve in the United States Congress was John Swasey (1859) in the 60th United States Congress. During the 73rd and 116th U.S. Congresses, four Bates alumni served simultaneously–Carroll Beedy (1903) and Charles Clason (1911) during the former sitting with Ben Cline (1994) and Jared Golden (2011) during the latter. Approximately 45% of alumni elected to the U.S. House of Representatives have done so in pairs. Many of the following alumni served in leadership positions in the House of Representatives.

| Name | Class year | Notability | Degree | Reference |
|---|---|---|---|---|
| John Swasey | Class of 1859 | United States representative from Maine (1908–1911) | B.A. | |
| Daniel McGillicuddy | Class of 1881 | United States representative from Maine (1911–1917) | 1877–80 | |
| Carroll Beedy | Class of 1903 | United States representative from Maine (1921–1935) | B.A. | |
| Charles Clason | Class of 1911 | United States representative from Massachusetts (1937–1949) | B.A. | |
| Donald Partridge | Class of 1914 | United States representative from Maine (1931–1933) | B.A. | |
| Frank Coffin | Class of 1940 | United States representative from Maine (1929–1933) | B.A. | |
| Leo Ryan | Class of 1944 | United States representative from California (1973–1978) | V-12 | |
| Robert Goodlatte | Class of 1974 | United States representative from Virginia (1993–2019); chaired House Judiciary Committee (2013-2019) | B.A. | |
| Ben Cline | Class of 1994 | United States representative from Virginia (2019–present) | B.A. | |
| Jared Golden | Class of 2011 | United States representative from Maine (2019–present) | B.A. | |

==== Governors ====
| Name | Class year | Notability | Degree | Reference |
|---|---|---|---|---|
| Carl Milliken | Class of 1897 | Governor of Maine (1917–1921) | B.A. | |
| Harry Morrison Cheney | Class of 1886 | Acting governor of New Hampshire (1904) | B.A. | |
| Edmund Muskie | Class of 1936 | Governor of Maine (1955–1959) | B.A. | |

==== State officials and cabinet-ranked officials ====
The following alumni have served in U.S. state governments, typically in the state judiciary and executive cabinet. Many of them also served in additional leadership roles in state government.

| Name | Class year | Notability | Degree | Reference |
|---|---|---|---|---|
| Henri Haskell | Class of 1862 | Montana attorney general (1889–1897) | B.A. | |
| James Donavan | Class of 1880 | Montana attorney general (1900–1904) | 1878–79 | |
| Scott Wilson | Class of 1892 | Maine attorney general (1913–1915) | B.A. | |
| Rick Sullivan | Class of 1981 | Massachusetts secretary of Energy and Environmental Affairs (2011–2014) | B.A. | |
| Gurbir Grewal | Class of 1995 | New Jersey attorney general (2018–present) | 1991–94 | |

==== State senators ====
Many of the following alumni served in leadership positions in their respective state's upper house, including president of the senate, majority leader, minority leader, as well as minority and majority whip.

| Name | Class year | Notability | Degree | Reference |
|---|---|---|---|---|
| Patrick Sleeper | Class of 1867 | Member of the Maine Senate (1887–1891) | B.A. | |
| Charles Horace Hersey | Class of 1871 | Member of the New Hampshire Senate (1887–1888) | B.A. | |
| Alonzo Marston Garcelon | Class of 1872 | Member of the Maine Senate (1907–1915) | B.A. | |
| Nathan Willard Harris | Class of 1873 | Member of the Maine Senate (1902–1906) | B.A. | |
| George Edwin Smith | Class of 1874 | Member of the Massachusetts Senate (1898–1904) | B.A. | |
| Henry Chandler | Class of 1874 | Member of the Florida Senate (1880–1994) | B.A. | |
| Albert Spear | Class of 1875 | Member of the Maine Senate (1893–1894) | B.A. | |
| Oliver Barrett Clason | Class of 1877 | Member of the Maine Senate (1897–1891) | B.A. | |
| Newell Perkins Noble | Class of 1877 | Member of the Maine Senate (1900–1901) | B.A. | |
| Ansel LaForest Lumbert | Class of 1879 | Member of the Maine Senate (1885–1888) | 1875–77 | |
| George Granville Weeks | Class of 1882 | Member of the Maine Senate (1899–1902) | 1877–80 | |
| Frank Andrew Morey | Class of 1885 | Member of the Maine Senate (1913–1915) | B.A. | |
| Harry Morrison Cheney | Class of 1886 | Member of the New Hampshire Senate (1903–1905) | B.A. | |
| John Henry Williamson | Class of 1886 | Member of the Colorado Senate (1920–1928) | B.A. | |
| William Ayer Walker | Class of 1887 | Member of the Maine Senate (1909–1911) | B.A. | |
| Cyrus Nathan Blanchard | Class of 1892 | Member of the Maine Senate (1899–1900) | B.A. | |
| Carl Milliken | Class of 1897 | Member of the Maine Senate (1909–1915) | B.A. | |
| William Edwards Kinney | Class of 1889 | Member of the New Hampshire Senate (1915–1917) | B.A. | |
| Harry Harding Thurlow | Class of 1900 | Member of the Maine Senate (1911–1913) | 1896–97 | |
| Allison Prince Howes | Class of 1903 | Member of the Maine Senate (1909–1910) | B.A. | |
| John Jenkins | Class of 1974 | Member of the Maine Senate (1996–1998) | B.A. | |
| Jeffrey Butland | Class of 1984 | Member of the Maine Senate (1992–1996) | B.A. | |
| Kevin Raye | Class of 1983 | Member of the Maine Senate (2004–2012) | B.A. | |
| Gerald Davis | Class of 1959 | Member of the Maine Senate (2008–2010) | B.A. | |
| Nate Libby | Class of 2007 | Member of the Maine Senate (2014–2022) | B.A. | |

==== State representatives ====
Many of the following alumni served in leadership positions in their respective state's lower house, including speaker of the house, majority leader, minority leader, as well as minority and majority whip.

| Name | Class year | Notability | Degree | Reference |
|---|---|---|---|---|
| John Fullonton | Class of 1848 | Member of the New Hampshire House of Representatives (1867–1868) | B.A. | |
| Roscoe Smith | Class of 1869 | Member of the Maine House of Representatives (1891–1893) | 1866–67 | |
| Charles Horace Hersey | Class of 1871 | Member of the New Hampshire House of Representatives (1885–1887) | B.A. | |
| Liberty Haven Hutchison | Class of 1871 | Member of the Maine House of Representatives (1795–1881) | B.A. | |
| Alonzo Marston Garcelon | Class of 1872 | Member of the Maine House of Representatives (1893–1902) | B.A. | |
| Nathan Willard Harris | Class of 1873 | Member of the Maine House of Representatives (1899–1905) | B.A. | |
| Edmund Randall Angell | Class of 1873 | Member of the New Hampshire House of Representatives (1890–1892) | B.A. | |
| Francis Low Noble | Class of 1874 | Member of the Maine House of Representatives (1887–1891) | B.A. | |
| Edward Newton Merrill | Class of 1874 | Member of the Maine House of Representatives (1899–1900, 1900–1905) | 1970–72 | |
| William Henry Ham | Class of 1874 | Member of the Washington House of Representatives (1895–1896) | B.A. | |
| George Edwin Smith | Class of 1874 | Member of the Massachusetts House of Representatives (1883–1884) | B.A. | |
| Albert Spear | Class of 1875 | Member of the Maine House of Representatives (1883–1885) | B.A. | |
| Charles Sumner Libby | Class of 1875 | Member of the Colorado House of Representatives (1880–1884) | B.A. | |
| Oliver Barrett Clason | Class of 1877 | Member of the Maine House of Representatives (1889–1893) | B.A. | |
| William Pierce Martin | Class of 1880 | Member of the Massachusetts House of Representatives (1893–1894) | B.A. | |
| John Scott | Class of 1880 | Member of the Maine House of Representatives (1887–1888, 1893–1894) | 1867–77 | |
| Mark Trafton Newton | Class of 1880 | Member of the Maine House of Representatives (1907–1908) | B.A. | |
| Daniel McGillicuddy | Class of 1881 | Member of the Maine House of Representatives (1885–1886) | 1877–80 | |
| George Granville Weeks | Class of 1882 | Member of the Maine House of Representatives (1893–1894, 1897–1899, 1903–1904, 1907–1910) | 1877–80 | |
| Albert Millet | Class of 1883 | Member of the Maine House of Representatives (1911–1912) | 1879–80 | |
| Cyrus Harvey Little | Class of 1884 | Member of the New Hampshire House of Representatives (1897–1903) | B.A. | |
| Morrill Newman Drew | Class of 1885 | Member of the Maine House of Representatives (1891–1895) | B.A. | |
| Frank Andrew Morey | Class of 1885 | Member of the Maine House of Representatives (1911–1913) | B.A. | |
| Harry Morrison Cheney | Class of 1886 | Member of the New Hampshire House of Representatives (1890–1894) | B.A. | |
| John Riley Dunton | Class of 1887 | Member of the Maine House of Representatives (1913–1914) | B.A. | |
| Leonard George Roberts | Class of 1887 | Member of the Massachusetts House of Representatives (1910–1914) | B.A. | |
| Arthur Stevens Littlefield | Class of 1887 | Member of the Maine House of Representatives (1903–1905) | B.A. | |
| William Edwards Kinney | Class of 1889 | Member of the New Hampshire House of Representatives (1913–1914) | B.A. | |
| Joseph Harrison Blanchard | Class of 1889 | Member of the Maine House of Representatives (1907–1908) | B.A. | |
| Thomas Cotter Spillane | Class of 1890 | Member of the Maine House of Representatives (1893–1894) | 1886–87 | |
| Cyrus Nathan Blanchard | Class of 1892 | Member of the Maine House of Representatives (1897–1897) | B.A. | |
| Albert Field Gilmore | Class of 1892 | Member of the Maine House of Representatives (1900–1901) | B.A. | |
| Jacob Roak Little | Class of 1892 | Member of the Maine House of Representatives (1903–1905) | B.A. | |
| Lauren Monroe Sanborn | Class of 1892 | Member of the Maine House of Representatives (1913–1915) | B.A. | |
| Carl Milliken | Class of 1897 | Member of the Maine House of Representatives (1905–1908) | B.A. | |
| Oliver Henry Toothaker | Class of 1898 | Member of the New Hampshire House of Representatives (1904–1909) | B.A. | |
| Alton Chapman Wheeler | Class of 1899 | Member of the Maine House of Representatives (1911–1913) | B.A. | |
| Alison Graham Catheron | Class of 1900 | Member of the Massachusetts House of Representatives (1913–1915) | B.A. | |
| Arthur Jesse Chick | Class of 1901 | Member of the Maine House of Representatives (1913–1914) | B.A. | |
| Allison Prince Howes | Class of 1903 | Member of the Maine House of Representatives (1905–1906) | B.A. | |
| Edmund Muskie | Class of 1936 | Member of the Maine House of Representatives (1946–1951) | B.A. | |
| Alonzo Conant | Class of 1936 | Member of the Maine House of Representatives (1941–1949) | B.A. | |
| Leo Ryan | Class of 1944 | Member of the California State Assembly (1962–1972) | V-12 | |
| Marianne Brenton | Class of 1955 | Member of the Massachusetts House of Representatives (1991–1997) | B.A. | |
| Sawin Millett | Class of 1959 | Member of the Maine House of Representatives (1969–1974) | B.A. | |
| Jeffrey Roy | Class of 1983 | Member of the Massachusetts House of Representatives (2013–present) | B.A. | |
| Ben Cline | Class of 1994 | Member of the Virginia House of Delegates (2002–2018) | B.A. | |
| Randall Bumps | Class of 1995 | Member of the Maine House of Representatives (1997–2002) | B.A. | |
| Bart Fromuth | Class of 2003 | Member of the New Hampshire House of Representatives (2014–present) | B.A. | |
| Nate Libby | Class of 2007 | Member of the Maine House of Representatives (2012–2014) | B.A. | |
| Jared Golden | Class of 2011 | Member of the Maine House of Representatives (2014–2018) | B.A. | |

==== Mayors ====
Six Bates alumni have served as the mayor of Lewiston, Maine, the hometown of the college. The smallest city to be governed by a Bates alumnus is Gardiner, Maine, while the largest is San Francisco, California. John Jenkins ('74) is the only alumnus to serve as mayor of two different cities (Lewiston and Auburn, Maine).

| Name | Class year | Notability | Degree | Reference |
|---|---|---|---|---|
| Holman Melcher | Class of 1862 | Mayor of Portland, Maine (1889–1895) | B.A. | |
| Alonzo Marston Garcelon | Class of 1872 | Mayor of Lewiston, Maine (1883–1884) | B.A. | |
| Nathan Willard Harris | Class of 1873 | Mayor of Auburn, Maine (1906–1909) | B.A. | |
| Albert Spear | Class of 1875 | Mayor of Gardiner, Maine (1889–1903) | B.A. | |
| Oliver Barrett Clason | Class of 1877 | Mayor of Gardiner, Maine (1894–1896) | B.A. | |
| George Edwin Smith | Class of 1873 | Mayor of Everett, Massachusetts (1892) | B.A. | |
| Wilbur Henry Judkins | Class of 1880 | Mayor of Lewiston, Maine (1897–1898) | B.A. | |
| Daniel McGillicuddy | Class of 1881 | Mayor of Lewiston, Maine (1887–1888, 1890–1891, 1902–1903) | 1877–80 | |
| Frank Andrew Morey | Class of 1885 | Mayor of Lewiston, Maine (1907–1912) | B.A. | |
| John Riley Dunton | Class of 1887 | Mayor of Belfast, Maine (1905–1906) | B.A. | |
| William Bertram Skelton | Class of 1892 | Mayor of Lewiston, Maine (1903–1905) | B.A. | |
| Leo Ryan | Class of 1944 | Mayor of South San Francisco, California (1962) | V-12 | |
| Art Agnos | Class of 1960 | Mayor of San Francisco, California (1988–1992) | B.A. | |
| John Jenkins | Class of 1974 | Mayor of Lewiston, Maine (1994–1998), mayor of Auburn, Maine (2007–2009) | B.A. | |
| Rick Sullivan | Class of 1981 | Mayor of Westfield, Massachusetts (1994–2007) | B.A. | |

==== Royalty ====
| Name | Class year | Notability | Degree | Reference |
|---|---|---|---|---|
| Lewis Penick Clinton | Class of 1897 | Prince Somayou of the Bassan tribe of West Africa | B.A. | |

=== Law and legal studies ===
==== Federal and state judges ====
The following section documents Bates alumni who have served in both the federal judiciary of the United States (including the U.S. district court system) and state judiciaries. Alumni who have served in executive positions, such as attorneys general (both on a state and federal level) are noted in the "federal officials and ambassadors" section above.

| Name | Class year | Notability | Degree | Reference |
|---|---|---|---|---|
| Stephen Arthur Lowell | Class of 1882 | United States District Court for the District of Oregon (1895–1900) | B.A. | |
| Scott Wilson | Class of 1892 | United States Court of Appeals for the First Circuit (1929–1942) | B.A. | |
| Frank Coffin | Class of 1940 | United States Court of Appeals for the First Circuit (1965–2006) | B.A. | |
| Morton Brody | Class of 1955 | United States District Court for the District of Maine (1991–2000) | B.A. | |
| Whitman L. Holt | Class of 2002 | United States Bankruptcy Court for the Eastern District of Washington (2019–present) | Bachelor of Arts (B.A.) | |

==== State supreme court justices ====
All Bates alumni who have gone to serve on a state supreme court have done so in the Maine supreme court system. There have been two chief justices and seven associate justices.

| Name | Class year | Notability | Degree | Reference |
|---|---|---|---|---|
| Enoch Foster | Class of 1860 | 30th associate justice of the Maine Supreme Court | B.A. | |
| Albert Spear | Class of 1875 | 39th associate justice of the Maine Supreme Court | B.A. | |
| Scott Wilson | Class of 1892 | 50th chief justice of the Maine Supreme Court (1925–1929); associate justice of the Maine Supreme Court (1918–1925) | B.A. | |
| Randolph Weatherbee | Class of 1932 | 80th associate justice of the Maine Supreme Court (1966–1976) | B.A. | |
| David Nichols | Class of 1942 | 86th associate justice of the Maine Supreme Court (1977–1988) | B.A. | |
| Vincent McKusick | Class of 1943 | 87th chief justice of the Maine Supreme Court (1977–1992) | B.A. | |
| Louis Scolnik | Class of 1945 | 94th associate justice of the Maine Supreme Court (1983–1988) | B.A. | |
| Morton Brody | Class of 1955 | 98th associate justice of the Maine Supreme Court (1990–1991) | B.A. | |

==== Legal academics and other legal figures ====
Alumni who have served in political or judicial offices are noted above. The following catalogues notable alumni who have contributed to legal studies, the law, or maintained notability in academia.

| Name | Class year | Notability | Degree | Reference |
|---|---|---|---|---|
| Ella Haskell | Class of 1884 | Suffragist, first woman to argue in front of the United States Supreme Court; first woman to practice law in Montana | B.A. | |
| John P. Davis | Class of 1926 | Civil rights attorney and journalist, defense attorney for Soviet agent and alleged Communist Alger Hiss | B.A. | |
| James Nabrit III | Class of 1952 | Civil rights attorney; argued Shuttlesworth v. Birmingham before the U.S. Supreme Court | B.A. | |
| Karen Hastie Williams | Class of 1966 | Clerk to Chief Justice Thurgood Marshall, chief counsel to United States Senate Committee on the Budget | B.A. | |
| Mark Helm | Class of 1992 | Defense attorney in the Elizabeth Smart kidnapping | B.A. | |

=== Academia and administration ===
==== University founders and presidents ====
| Name | Class year | Notability | Degree | Reference |
|---|---|---|---|---|
| Ransom Dunn | Class of 1840 | President of Hillsdale College and Rio Grande College; attended the college's divinity school | S.T.B. | |
| Nathan Cook Brackett | Class of 1860 | Founder of Storer College in West Virginia and chairman of Bluefield State College | S.T.B. | |
| Grenville Emery | Class of 1868 | Founder of Harvard-Westlake School in California | B.A. | |
| George Colby Chase | Class of 1869 | Second president of Bates College (1894–1919) | B.A. | |
| George Washington Flint | Class of 1871 | President of University of Connecticut (1898–1901) | B.A. | |
| James Baker | Class of 1873 | President of University of Colorado (1892–1914) | B.A. | |
| Walter Ranger | Class of 1879 | President of Rhode Island College and Johnson State College | B.A. | |
| Hamilton Hatter | Class of 1888 | President of Bluefield State College | B.A. | |
| Benjamin Mays | Class of 1920 | President of Morehouse College (1940–1967); mentor to Martin Luther King Jr. | B.A. | |
| Gordon B. Cross | Class of 1931 | President of Nichols College (1966–1973) | B.A. | |
| Val H. Wilson | Class of 1938 | President of Skidmore College (1957–1964) | B.A. | |
| William Rankin Dill | Class of 1951 | President of Babson College (1981–1989) | B.A. | |
| Warren H. Carroll | Class of 1953 | Founder and President of Christendom College | B.A. | |
| King Virgil Cheek | Class of 1959 | President of Shaw University (1969–1971), Morgan State University (1971–1974) | B.A. | |
| Robert Witt | Class of 1962 | Chancellor of the University of Alabama System (2012–2016); president of the University of Alabama (2003–2012), University of Texas (1995–2003) | B.A. | |
| John Strassburger | Class of 1964 | President of Ursinus College (1994–2010) | B.A. | |
| Valerie Smith | Class of 1975 | Dean of Princeton University (2011–2014); president of Swarthmore College (2015–present) | B.A. | |
| Scott Bierman | Class of 1977 | President of Beloit College (2009–present) | B.A. | |
| Nora Demleitner | Class of 1989 | President of St. John's College - Annapolis (2022–present) | B.A. | |

==== Professors and scholars ====
| Name | Class year | Notability | Degree | Reference |
|---|---|---|---|---|
| Mary Mitchell | Class of 1869 | First woman to graduate from a New England college; professor of English at Vassar College | S.T.B. | |
| Edward C. Hayes | Class of 1897 | President and founding member of the American Sociological Association | B.A. | |
| Stella James Sims | Class of 1897 | African-American professor of science at Storer College and Bluefield State College | B.A. | |
| Louis R. Sullivan | Class of 1914 | Anthropologist who wrote Essentials of Anthropometry (1928) | B.A. | |
| John Preston Davis | Class of 1926 | Intellectual, author and National Negro Congress activist | B.A. | |
| George Athan Billias | Class of 1948 | Professor emeritus of American History at Clark University | B.A. | |
| William Stringfellow | Class of 1949 | Peace activist, human rights lawyer, theologian | B.A. | |
| Gerald Zaltman | Class of 1960 | Author, professor at Harvard Business School (1991–present) | B.A. | |
| William H. Tucker | Class of 1967 | Psychologist and author | B.A. | |
| Richard James Gelles | Class of 1968 | Dean of School of Social Policy and Practice (2003–present) | B.A. | |
| Jeffrey K. Tulis | Class of 1972 | Author, professor of Government, professor of Law and Professor of Communication Studies at The University of Texas at Austin | B.A. | |
| G. Samantha Rosenthal | Class of 2005 | Author, historian, associate professor of History at Roanoke College | B.A. | |

=== Athletics ===
At the 1912 Summer Olympics, two Bates alumni competed in the sporting event, both representing the United States in baseball exhibitions. Nancy Ingersoll Fiddler ('78) and Andrew Byrnes ('05) are the only two alumni to compete in two Olympic Games, competing in two successive winter and summer Olympics, respectively. Byrnes is the only Bates alumnus to medal at the Olympic Games, winning a gold medal rowing for Canada during the 2008 Summer Olympics.

| Name | Class year | Notability | Degree | Reference |
|---|---|---|---|---|
| Harry Lord | Class of 1908 | Professional baseball player and founding member of the Boston Red Sox (1901–1914) | B.A. | |
| Bobby Messenger | Class of 1908 | Professional baseball player for the Chicago White Sox and St. Louis Browns (1909–1914) | B.A. | |
| Vaughn Blanchard | N/A | Baseball player, represented the United States at the 1912 Summer Olympics | B.A. | |
| Frank Keaney | Class of 1911 | University of Rhode Island head coach of basketball, baseball, and football, credited with inventing basketball's "fast break"; inducted into the Basketball Hall of Fame in 1960 | B.A. | |
| Charles Small | Class of 1912 | Professional baseball player with the Boston Red Sox (1930) | B.A. | |
| Harlan Holden | N/A | Baseball player, represented Sweden at the 1912 Summer Olympics | 1910–12 | |
| Ray Buker | Class of 1922 | Track and field runner, represented the United States at the 1924 Summer Olympics | B.A. | |
| Arnold Adams | Class of 1933 | Runner, represented the United States at the 1932 Winter Olympics | B.A. | |
| Nancy Ingersoll Fiddler | Class of 1978 | Skier, represented the United States at the 1988 and 1992 Winter Olympics | B.A. | |
| John Henry Williams | Class of 1991 | Minor league baseball player, son of Ted Williams | B.A. | |
| Michael Ferry | Class of 1997 | Rower, represented the United States at the 2000 Summer Olympics | B.A. | |
| Justin Freeman | Class of 1998 | Skier, represented the United States during the 2006 Winter Olympics | B.A. | |
| Andrew Byrnes | Class of 2005 | Rower, represented Canada at the 2008 (won gold medal) and 2012 Summer Olympics (silver) | B.A. | |
| Haley Johnson | Class of 2006 | Rower, represented Canada at the 2010 Winter Olympics | 2003–05 | |
| Emily Bamford | Class of 2015 | Downhill skier, represented Australia at the 2014 Winter Olympics | 2012–14 | |
| Dinos Lefkaritis | Class of 2019 | Alpine skier, represented Cyprus at the 2018 Winter Olympics | B.A. | |
| Cole De Magistris | Class of 2024 | Professional football player; former player for the Toronto Argonauts and current player for the Orlando Pirates | B.A. | |

=== Business ===
| Name | Class year | Notability | Degree | Reference |
|---|---|---|---|---|
| Albert Newman | Class of 1860 | Founder of Newman's Dry Goods Company (1916) | B.A. | |
| Daniel Collamore Heath | Class of 1868 | Founder of D. C. Heath and Company of Houghton Mifflin (1885) | 1865–67 | |
| Robert Kinney | Class of 1939 | CEO of General Mills (1973–1981) | B.A. | |
| Barry Greenfield | Class of 1956 | Managing director of the Fidelity Fund (1967–1999) | B.A. | |
| James Wallach | Class of 1964 | CEO of Central National-Gottesman (1979–1998) | B.A. | |
| Bruce E. Stangle | Class of 1970 | CEO of Analysis Group (1981 to 2004), Founder | B.A. | |
| Joseph Willit | Class of 1973 | CFO and COO of Merrill Lynch (1993–1998, 1998–2002) | B.A. | |
| David B. Snow | Class of 1976 | CEO of Medco Health Solutions (2003–2014) | B.A. | |
| Paul Kazarian | Class of 1978 | CEO of Japonica Partners (1988–present) | B.A. | |
| Jamie Merisotis | Class of 1978 | CEO of the Lumina Foundation (2008–present) | B.A. | |
| Michael Bonney | Class of 1981 | CEO of Cubist Pharmaceuticals (2003–2014) | B.A. | |
| Louis Vachon | Class of 1983 | CEO of the National Bank of Canada (2007–present) | B.A. | |
| Michael Chu | Class of 1980 | Global co-CEO at L Catterton (1989–present) | B.A. | |
| Darrell Crate | Class of 1989 | Chief financial officer of Affiliated Managers Group (1998–2011) | B.A. | |
| Joshua Macht | Class of 1991 | Group publisher of the Harvard Business Review Group (2009–present) | B.A. | |

=== Religion ===
| Name | Class year | Notability | Degree | Reference |
|---|---|---|---|---|
| John Dunjee | Class of 1867 | Baptist preacher; son of U.S. President John Tyler | B.A. | |
| Alfred Anthony | Class of 1885 | Author, religious scholar | B.A. | |
| Frank Sandford | Class of 1886 | Religious leader and founder of "The Kingdom" | B.A. | |
| Peter J. Gomes | Class of 1965 | Prominent theologian, Baptist pastor, and chaplain of Harvard University | B.A. | |

=== Science ===
| Name | Class year | Notability | Degree | Reference |
|---|---|---|---|---|
| Frank Haven Hall | Class of 1862 | Inventor of the modern Braille typographer | 1863–64 | |
| Edward Hill | Class of 1863 | Surgeon, founder of Central Maine Medical Center | B.A. | |
| Hamilton Hatter | Class of 1888 | African-American inventor and academic | B.S. | |
| John Irwin Hutchinson | Class of 1889 | Mathematician; wrote Differential and Integral Calculus (1902) and Elementary Treatise on the Calculus (1912) | B.S. | |
| Herbert Walter | Class of 1892 | Marine biologist; founded new biology curriculum at Brown University; principal biologist at the Woods Hole Oceanographic Institution | B.S. | |
| John A. Kenney Jr. | Class of 1942 | President of National Medical Association (1962–1963) | B.S. | |
| George Hammond | Class of 1943 | Chemist, professor, researcher; recipient of the Norris Award in 1968, the Priestley Medal in 1976, the National Medal of Science in 1994, and the Othmer Gold Medal in 2003; created Hammond's postulate, a hypothesis in physical organic chemistry which describes the geometric structure of the transition state in an organic chemical reaction | B.S. | |
| Zanvil Cohn | Class of 1948 | Cell biologist and immunologist; National Academy of Sciences trustee; upon his death was described by the New York Times as being "in the forefront of current studies of the body's defenses against infection" | B.S. | |
| Robert McAfee | Class of 1956 | President of the American Medical Association (1994–1995) | B.A. | |
| Steven M. Girvin | Class of 1971 | Physicist, known for his theoretical work on quantum many body systems, such as the fractional quantum Hall effect; professor at Yale University; Deputy Provost for Research of Yale, 2007-2017 | B.A. | |

=== Military ===
| Name | Class year | Notability | Degree | Reference |
|---|---|---|---|---|
| Aaron Daggett | Class of 1860 | Attended 1860, Civil War brigadier general of the volunteers, abolitionist, last surviving Civil War general, died in 1938 | B.A. | |
| Frederick Hayes | Class of 1861 | Received the Medal of Honor with the 27th Maine Regiment in the Civil War | B.A. | |
| Holman Melcher | Class of 1862 | Civil War hero at the Battle of Gettysburg with the 20th Maine Volunteer Infantry Regiment | B.A. | |
| James Ezekiel Porter | Class of 1862 | Killed at Little Bighorn at "Custer's Last Stand" | 1862–63 | |
| Lewis Millett | Class of 1949 | Received Medal of Honor for actions in the Korean War | B.A. | |
| William Prendergast | Class of 1990 | Commander of the Oregon National Guard, deputy commander of U.S. Army Africa (2017–present) | B.A. | |

== Fictional people ==
| Fictional work | Date | Fictional person | Degree | Reference |
|---|---|---|---|---|
| St. Elsewhere | 1982 | Dr. Jacqueline (Jackie) Wade (played by Sagan Lewis) is an alumna of Bates College in her hometown of Lewiston, Maine. | B.S. | |
| Ally McBeal | 1997 | In the episode "Compromising Positions" it is revealed that Ally McBeal's brother is a fictional alumnus of Bates. Later, Ally meets her first love interest of the series, Ronald, who is another fictional alumnus of the college and was her brother's roommate. | B.A. | |
| The Sopranos | 1999 | In the television episode entitled "College", Tony Soprano takes his daughter, Meadow, on a trip to Maine to visit colleges that she is considering. While walking past the college's chapel, she says, "[Bates College has] a 48-to-52 male-female ratio, which is great, strong liberal arts program and this cool Olin Arts Center for music." | N/A | |
| Kingdom Hospital | 2004 | Episode six, "The Young and the Headless", of the 13-part TV miniseries developed by Stephen King, based on Lars von Trier's The Kingdom, and set in Lewiston, opens on a shot of a Bates sign and visiting seismologist Richard Schwartzton (played by Gerard Plunkett) meeting dean of the college Bertram Swinton (played by William B. Davis). | | |
| 11.22.63 | 2011 | In the novel by Stephen King, the protagonist, Jacob Epping, is a fictional alumnus of Bates. | B.A. | |
| The Simpsons | 2015 | In the episode entitled "Paths of Glory", it is suggested to Lisa Simpson that she transfers to Bates from Oberlin College. | N/A | |
| 11.22.63 | 2016 | In the television episode entitled "The Truth", Maine time-traveler Jake Epping (played by James Franco) tells his sweetheart that he went to Bates. | B.A. | |
| Lady Dynamite | 2016 | The Netflix original series is loosely based on the life of Bates alumna Maria Bamford. Bamford plays a fictionalized version of herself whose character also attended Bates. | B.A. | |

== Notable faculty ==
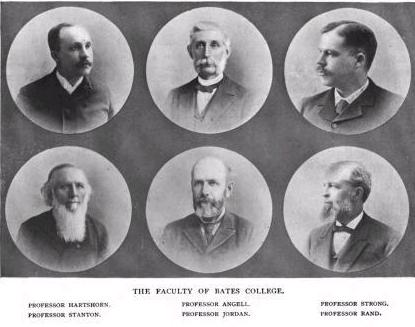
Members of the college's faculty in 1895

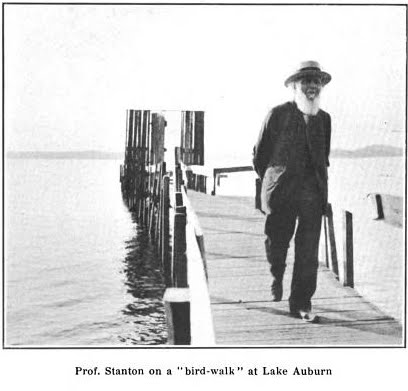
Professor John Stanton walking down a bird walk in Auburn, Maine in December 1918

Sociology

| 1863–1918 | Jonathan Stanton | (faculty member) |

Modern languages

| 1869–1902 | Thomas Angell | (faculty member) |

Religious studies

| 1864–1879 | John Jay Butler | (faculty member) |
| 1865–1906 | Benjamin Francis Hayes | (faculty member) |
| 1950 | James Gower | (visiting lecturer) |

Economics

| 1910–1919 | William Trufant Foster | (faculty member) |
| 1983–1985 | Leonard Burman | (faculty member) |

English

| 1923–1933 | Porter H. Dale | (faculty member) |
| 1980 | Fred D'Aguiar | (visiting lecturer) |

Debate

| 1927–1967 | Brooks Quimby | (faculty member) |

Political science

| 1968–2000 | Douglas Hodgkin | (faculty member) |
| 2009–2010 | Angus King | (visiting lecturer) |
| 2011– | Stephen Engel | (faculty member) |

Philosophy

| 1905–1942 | Halbert Hains Britan | (faculty member) |
| 1977–2026 | David Kolb | (faculty member) |

History

| 1979–2005 | Steve Hochstadt | (faculty member) |
| 1989–2017 | Margaret Creighton | (faculty member) |

Visual art

| 1970 | William Pope.L | (visiting lecturer) |

Theater

| 1979 | Carolyn Gage | (visiting lecturer) |

Music

| 1973 | Jody Diamond | (visiting lecturer) |

Anthropology

| 1978–2022 | Loring Danforth | (faculty member) |

== Presidents of Bates College ==
| | President | Term | Profession | Reference |
|---|---|---|---|---|
| 1 | Oren Burbank Cheney | 1863–1894 | Preacher | |
| 2 | George Colby Chase | 1894–1919 | Academic | |
| 3 | Clifton Daggett Gray | 1920–1944 | Theologian | |
| 4 | Charles Franklin Phillips | 1944–1967 | Economist | |
| 5 | Thomas Hedley Reynolds | 1967–1989 | Historian | |
| 6 | Donald West Harward | 1989–2002 | Philosopher | |
| 7 | Elaine Tuttle Hansen | 2002–2011 | Academic | |
| 8 | Clayton Spencer | 2012–2023 | Lawyer | |
| 9 | Garry Jenkins | 2023–present | Lawyer | |

== See also ==
- History of Bates College
- Traditions of Bates College
