= Brooks Quimby Debate Council =

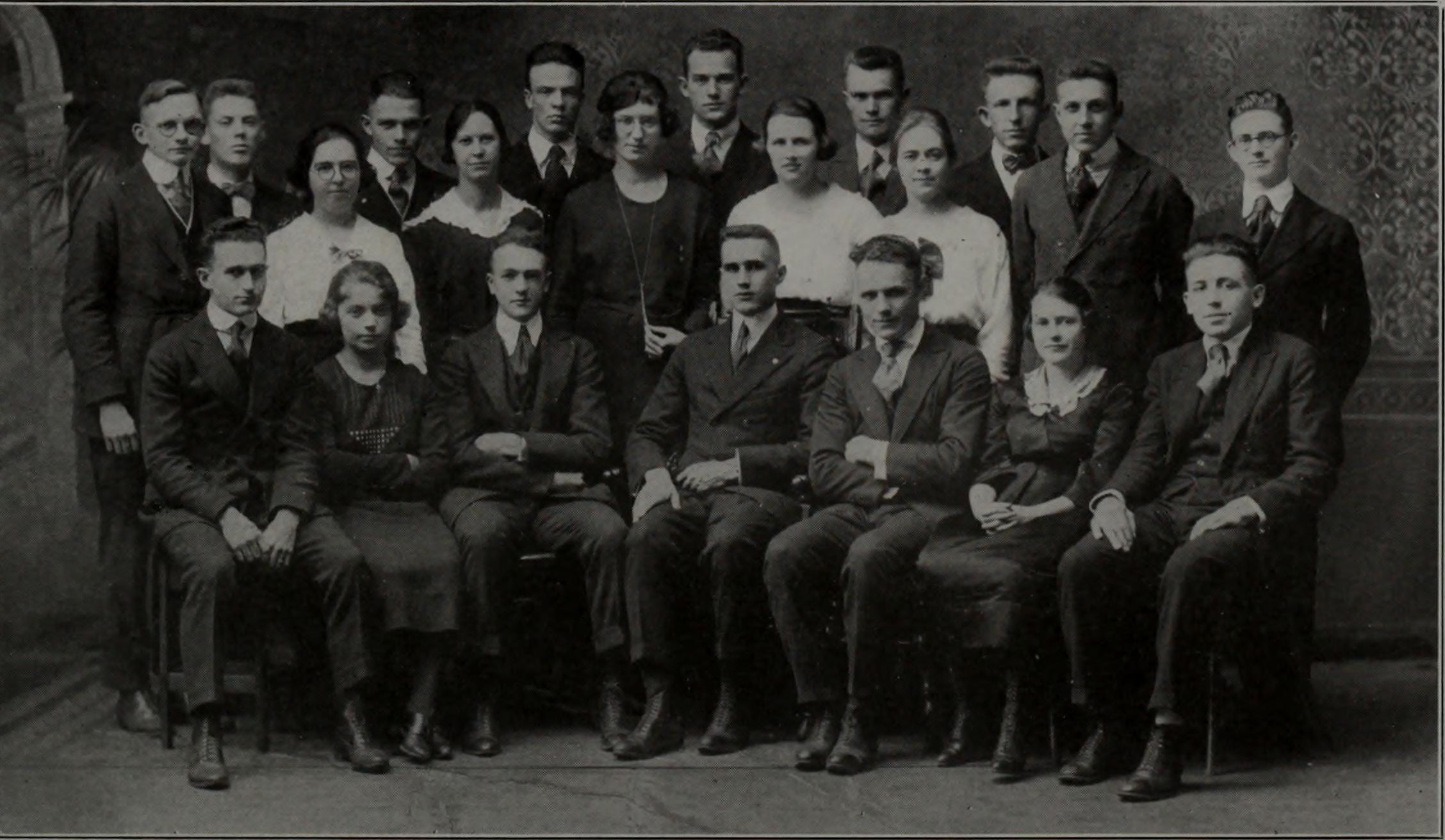
- A convening of the 1921 Council with Brooks Quimby upper left of the foreground
- Named after: Brooks Quimby
- Formation: March 20, 1854
- Founded at: Lewiston, Maine, U.S.
- Coaches: Lauren Buisker and Manuel Machorro
- Affiliations: American Parliamentary Debate; World Universities Debating; Oxford Union

The Brooks Quimby Debate Council (BQDC) is a debate society in Lewiston, Maine, primarily comprising students from Bates College. The society, known for participating in British and American parliamentary debate styles, competes in the American Parliamentary Debate Association and the World Universities Debating Championship. Notably, it engaged in a debate with Oxford University in 1923, marking Oxford's first debate in the United States.

== History ==
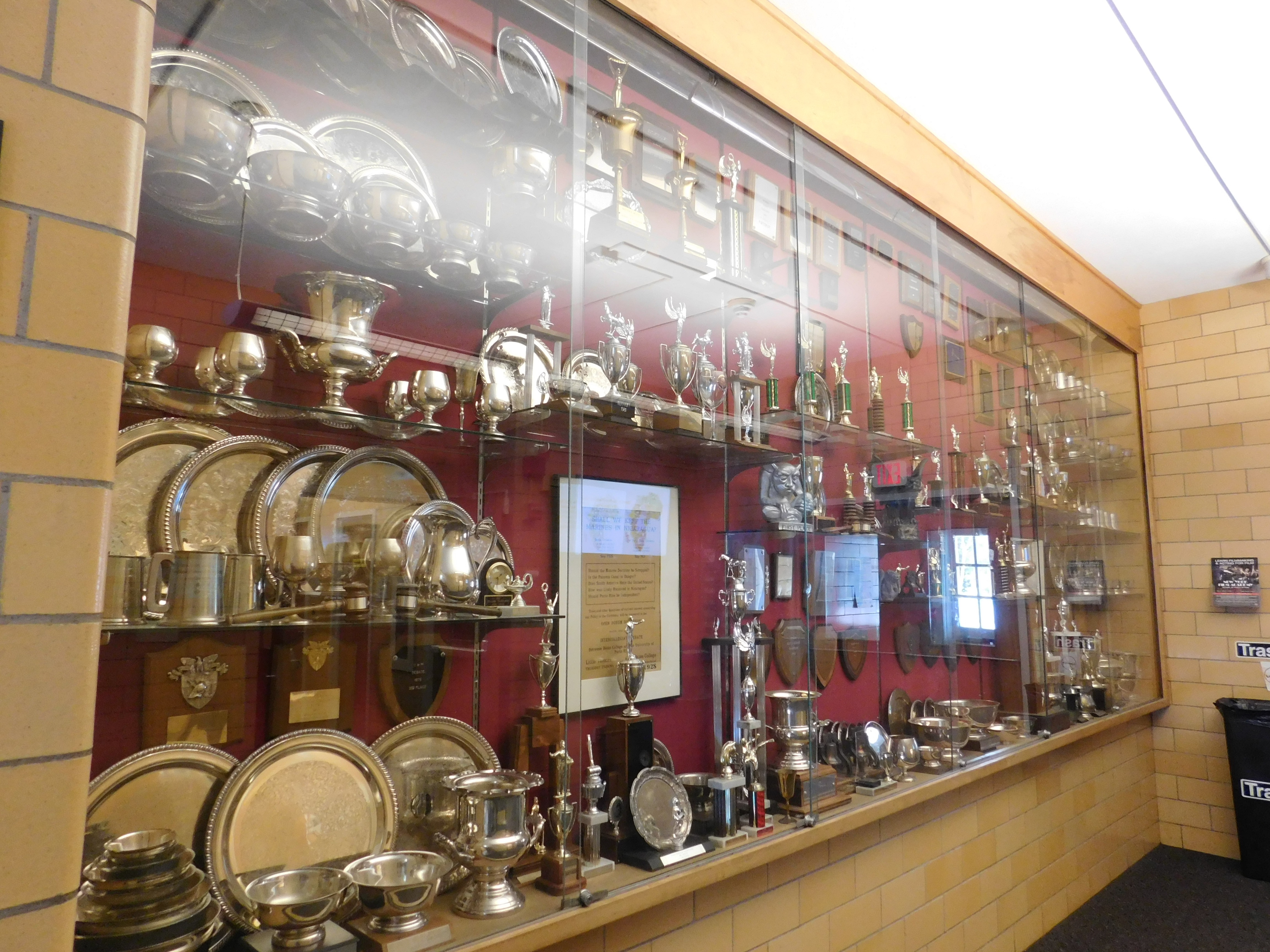
A trophy wall of the debate society in Pettigrew Hall, 2015

The debate society's origins trace back to the Maine State Seminary, predating Bates College establishment. It was officially recognized in 1869 when the State of Maine granted charters to the Polymnian and Eurosophian Societies, early debating and literary groups at Bates. Women began participating in debates at Bates in the 1870s. Under the guidance of Brooks Quimby, a Bates alumnus and faculty member, the society became the first in the United States to engage in intercollegiate international debates.

The 1930s marked a significant period known as 'The Quimby Institute,' where intensive individualized debate training was introduced. This period coincided with the society's first international competitions. Key moments in society history include a victory over Harvard College in 1920 and participating in the first intercontinental collegiate debate against the Oxford Union in 1921.

The team has reached the final round of the World Universities Debating Championships (WUDC) twice. In 2024, the BQDC also reached the final round of the Oxford Inter-varsity Competition. The team has reached the finals of the U.S. Universities Debating Championship on three occasions, becoming national runner-ups in 2019 and 2025, and national champions in 2014. Nationally, it ranked 5th in 2013 and 9th globally in 2012. The New York Times described Bates College as a "power center" for college debating in America in 1922.

=== Membership and status ===
The BQDC actively competes both domestically and internationally, with notable achievements including winning the US Nationals at the U.S. Universities Debating Championship. It continues to maintain a strong national and global ranking.

== Notable alumni ==
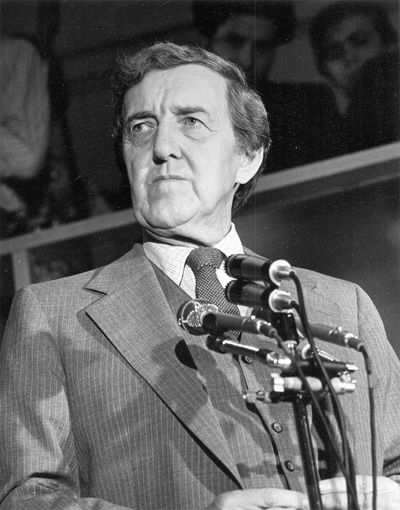
U.S. Secretary of State Edmund Muskie, 1980

- U.S. Secretary of State Edmund Muskie
- U.S. Assistant Secretary of State for African Affairs Constance Berry Newman
- Civil rights leader Benjamin Mays
- U.S. Governor Carl Miliken
- U.S. Minister to Columbia John Abbott
- U.S. Representative John P. Swasey
- U.S. Representative Carroll Beedy
- U.S. Representative Charles Clason
- U.S. Representative Donald Partridge
- U.S. Representative Frank Coffin
- U.S. Representative Leo Ryan
- U.S. Representative Robert Goodlatte
- U.S. Representative Ben Cline
- Chief Justice of the Maine Supreme Court Scott Wilson
- Chief Justice of the Maine Supreme Court Albert Spear
- Chief Justice of the Maine Supreme Court Vincent McKusick
- Associate Justice of the Maine Supreme Court Enoch Foster
- Associate Justice of the Maine Supreme Court Randolph Weatherbee
- Associate Justice of the Maine Supreme Court David Nichols
- Associate Justice of the Maine Supreme Court Louis Scolnick
- Associate Justice of the Maine Supreme Court Morton Brody
- Maine State Senate Majority Leader Nate Libby
- State Senator George Edwin Smith
- State Senator Henry Chandler
- State Senator Jeffrey Butland
- State Senator Kevin Raye
- State Senator Gerald Davis
- State Representative Sawin Millett
- State Representative Jeffrey Roy
- State Representative Marianne Brenton
- Mayor of San Francisco Art Agnos
- Mayor of Auburn, Lewiston John Jenkins
- United States Attorney for Alabama Joyce White Vance

== See also ==
- Oxford Union, debating society in Oxford, England
