= Paul Kazarian =

American businessman (born 1955)

Paul B. Kazarian
- Born: October 15, 1955 (age 70)
- Education: Columbia University; Brown University; Bates College
- Occupations: Investor and philanthropist
- Years active: 1981–present
- Employer(s): Goldman Sachs (1981–1987); Sunbeam-Oster (1990–1993)
- Known for: Founding and leading Japonica Partners; Executing an outsized sovereign bond portfolio during the 2013 Greek government-debt crisis

Paul B. Kazarian (/kəˈzæriən/ kə-ZARR-ee-ən; born October 15, 1955) is an Armenian-American investor, philanthropist, and former investment banker. He is the founder, managing director and chief executive officer (CEO) of Japonica Partners, a private equity hedge fund. Previous to his founding of the firm, he was an investment banker for Goldman Sachs and briefly served as the president and CEO of Sunbeam-Oster from 1990 to 1993 as a corporate raider.

He is known for his bidding wars with high net worth individuals and companies to gain assets for his firm, most notably his bidding war against Kohlberg Kravis Roberts (KKR) for the acquisition of Borden. Kazarian is seen to be secretive about current or future investment decisions; he opens and closes positions without prior announcement or much after-trade commentary. He is considered by the investment community to be a "vulture capitalist". Due to its high buy-ins ($250 million), The Hedge Fund Journal called his fund a "money manager for money managers".

During the 2013 Greek government-debt crisis, Kazarian become one of the largest bidders for Greek bonds, eventually executing a bond portfolio of €2.9 billion (US$3.8 billion). As the sole owner of the bond position, this portfolio makes up the majority of his overall net worth. On December 11, 2017, it was reported that Kazarian opened an office branch in Lisbon, Portugal tasked with "snapping up assets" in the country's real estate and technology markets.

== Early life and education ==
Paul B. Kazarian was born on October 15, 1955, the son of immigrants from Armenia. His grandparents were Charles and Agnes Kazarian; both of them escaped the Armenian genocide. Kazarian grew up in an Armenian community in Pawtucket, Rhode Island–a small mill town— and would go on to name his future investment fund after the street he grew up on: Japonica Street–the name of a Japanese flower.

He graduated from Bates College in Lewiston, Maine, with a Bachelors of Arts, before attending Brown University to get a master's degree. He went on graduate from Columbia Business School with a M.B.A. During nights at Columbia, he interned at Goldman Sachs, after-which he was offered a full-time position at the firm in their investment banking division.

== Investment career ==
=== Goldman Sachs & Co. ===
In 1981, Kazarian was hired as a full-time investment banker at Goldman Sachs & Co. While at Goldman he worked with multinational investment clients and emerging markets. He often stayed up past 4 AM competing work during his time at the firm. He left Goldman in 1987.

=== Japonica Partners ===
Japonica Partners was formally founded in 1988 in Providence, Rhode Island, by Kazarian. Since its founding, Kazarian has been president and CEO of the firm. In 1993, he founded the Charles & Agnes Kazarian Eternal Foundation, for which he has also been chairman since its inception. Through his earlier years with Japonica, Kazarian oversaw approximately $2 billion in shareholder wealth. The company specializes in under-performing global asset classes and undervalued investment positions.

==== Sunbeam coup ====
In 1990, Kazarian, then 37, was asked to serve out a three-year term as chairman and CEO of Sunbeam-Oster, after his private equity firm bought it out in a corporate raid. During his tenure he brought the company back from the verge of bankruptcy and created multiple profit streams for the company, ultimately returning it to profitability. His time as head of the company is used as a case study at Harvard Business School; Steven Fenster, a professor at Harvard University, has been quoted as labeling Kazarian as "a mad genius" with "incredible" business acumen. According to an article by The Wall Street Journal, employees at the firm viewed him as an "overbearing boss whose frequent harangues and erratic, autocratic behavior made their lives miserable". He often called top managers to "crisis meetings" at late hours in the night and encouraged inter-departmental competition. Top managers at the firm said that they were "pitted against one another, publicly hazed, humiliated and even physically intimidated". Roderick Hills, former chair of the U.S. Securities and Exchange Commission, said of Kazarian: "as Will Rogers said, no one is quite as good or quite as bad as they're supposed to be." In 1991, he was compensated with $1.84 million. During his tenure he was known to give bonuses to his top managers, sometimes spanning up to 20% of annual pay. Three years later, the board of directors compensated him with a pay package of $2.75 million. However, his management style was viewed as "unacceptable" in the coming years. Kazarian wanted to move the company headquarters to Nashville, Tennessee because of their relaxed tax structure over Rhode Island–something he began to initiate without the board's approval.

The board of directors of the company asked Kazarian to step down as CEO, but after his refusal and attempt to over take executives positions, his employment contract was suspended and eventually terminated. After his was fired, the company's stock dropped by 10% and took four months to recover–however, trading volume for the stock was permanently expanded. Months after his dismissal from the company and return to Japonica, some of his associates at Sunbeam brought multiple lawsuits against him–he won all of them, garnering a total of $160 million in settlements.

=== Greek debt crisis trade ===
External videos
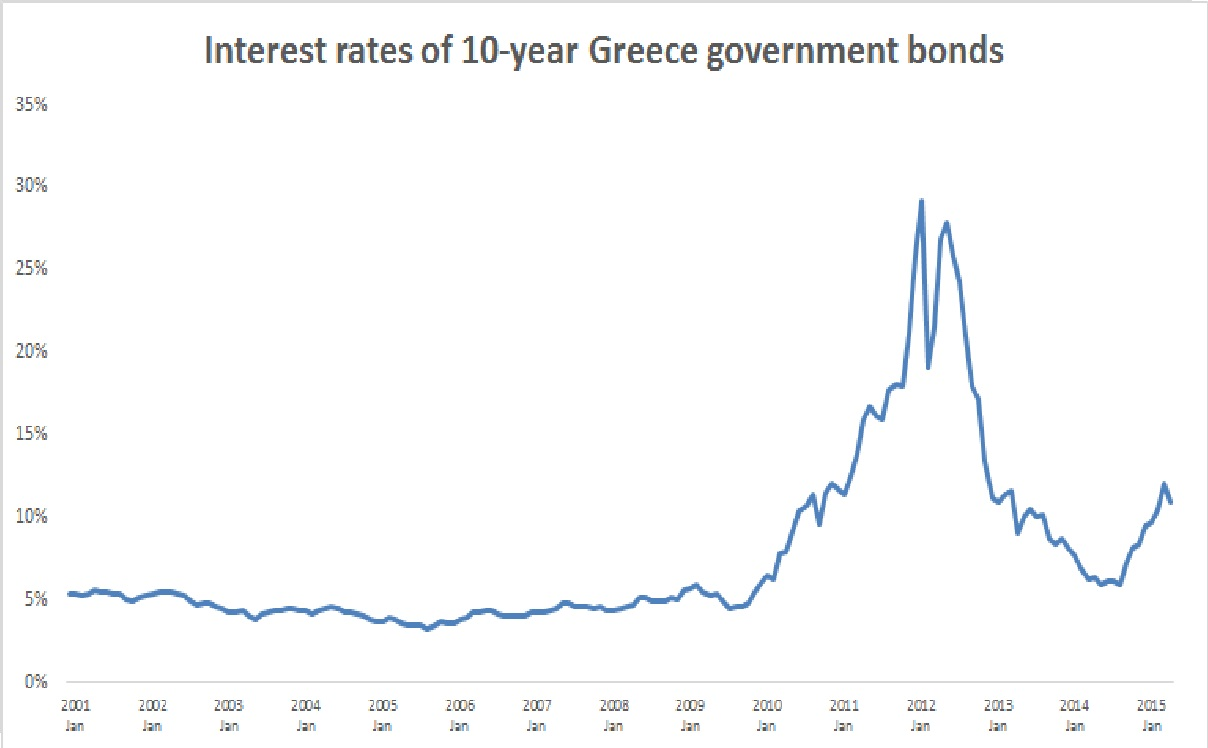
- Japonica's Kazarian: "How & Why I Bought 4 bn in Greek Bonds"–GreekReporter, December 2013

After seeing southern European economic decline, he began to look at companies in the area to invest in. On a trip to Greece, he inquired about the government's financial statements; after hearing they did not assemble these statements, he began researching spending and debt ratios of the country. He noticed a difference between the reality of its economy and accounting figures prompting him to begin purchasing government bonds in June 2013 following the country's 2012 legislative elections. Kazarain did not disclose why he was buying these bonds to the Greek government or how much he was purchasing. His initial billion was purchased at 11 cents a bond, eventually concluding at 45 cents. The bonds would go on to be priced at 57/cent a share, marking considerable profit. Although Kazarian would only go on to execute $3.8 billion in bonds, he has insinuated that he has nearly $4 billion in his aggregate bond portfolio.

During the 2013 Greek government-debt crisis, Kazarian become one of the largest bidders for Greek government bonds, eventually offering a bond portfolio of €2.9 billion euros (approximately $3.8 billion U.S. dollars). His offering was largely ignored by financial analysts and economists who labeled his trade "risky and volatile." The government agreed to execute the trade at market price and purchased his partial bond portfolio. During the crisis he met with "Greek finance ministers in Athens, top policy makers in Berlin, officials at the European Central Bank in Frankfurt and economists at the International Monetary Fund in Washington," according to The New York Times.

== Investment philosophy ==
He is considered by the investment community to be a "vulture capitalist". He is known for buying out, taking over, or taking a position in distressed companies that face serious financial uncertainty–in an effort to buy at a discount–eventually making them profitable before selling. Due to its high buy-ins ($250 million), The Hedge Fund Journal called his fund a "money manager for money managers". During his Greek bond trade, he mentioned the accounting strategy he used to force the bond value rise. He said that there is an international standard for accounting that is not used by the European Union, instead opting for a legal framework that distorts the eurozone's financial positions–meant for legal compliance not accountability. The conflation of "future value" as "present value" lead Kazarian to begin initiating his trade. He does not disclose specific investment positions or strategies to protect long-term deals and trades.

== Personal life ==
Wiry and intense, Kazarian can come across as slightly offbeat. With the pink oxford shirts he wears every day, he deploys a plastic pocket protector that holds his collection of six pens and markers. His mien can veer from professorial to a bit manic, especially when he senses that someone is not quite grasping his line of reasoning.

— Landon Thomas of The New York Times on Kazarian, 2007

He resides in a home in Providence, Rhode Island. Kazarian is known for his "round, horn-rimmed glasses" that have become his "trademark".

On October 6, 2016, The Accountant, the International Accounting Bulletin, and Timetric granted Kazarian the special editors' award of global accountancy magazines for his contribution to strengthening democracy through government financial management.

Kazarian has guest-lectured and spoken on the topics of business and philanthropy in settings ranging from the Harvard Business School, London Business School, Columbia Business School, and Dartmouth's Tuck Business School, to the U.S. Military Academy at West Point, and the National School of Development at Peking University.

== Political and economic views ==
Although Kazarian has not disclosed his own political affiliations, he has publicly commented on numerous issues.

=== Views on Greek financial stability ===
After his $3 billion government-debt rate he has commented on the need for financial and economic reform in Greece following the 2013 Greek government-debt crisis. He has called for the country to appoint a "five-star finance minister" with "international-caliber five-star specialist training and capabilities to build trust and credibility." Kazarian has called for the country to adopt Public Sector Accounting Standards (IPSAS), when the Greek debt structure reaches 18% of GDP.

=== Views on Greek debt ===
He is an ardent supporter of the financial system of Greece. Often asserting that the country's debt is much lower than official reporting discloses, he notes government bonds as being profitable—contrary to reports by the Bloomberg's World Bond Index. He has often stated that "the method by which Greece's debt is calculated in the Eurozone is determined by the Maastricht Treaty and can change only with a unanimous decision by the European Council."–leading to inflated or inaccurate net positions of countries. In an interview with Bloomberg Markets, he voiced his problem with nearly $19 billion being issued in debt-forgiveness for Greece but their debt ratings remaining the same. He believes that "the Greek debt should be measured not at face value, which is 312 billion euros in 2015, but on a time of repayment basis, which would bring a substantial write-off due to low interest rates and the fact that its repayment will start in 10 years."

=== Mario Draghi ===
Kazarian has mentioned that Mario Draghi, the president of the European Central Bank, faces too much pressure from "the inaction and inability of politicians" which minimizes the efficiency and effectiveness of the eurozone. He asserts the numerous "badly managed" European governments have rendered the office of the E.U. Central Bank politically pressured. His critique of Draghi's choice to lower zone interest rates was met with some controversy.

== Wealth and philanthropy ==
During the 2013 Greek government-debt crisis, Kazarian made an official public offer to the government of Greece of a bond portfolio of 2.9 billion euros (approximately US$3.8 billion), and the government agreed to execute the trade, paying Kazarian full market price for his bonds. Many financial analysts speculate that Kazarian still has considerable holdings in Greek debt. As of December 2016, his net worth is between $4 billion and $4.1 billion.

In 1993, Kazarian established two non-profit foundations whose charitable missions include economic development, education, and technology. The first, the Charles & Agnes Kazarian Eternal Foundation (CAKE) is named in honor of his grandparents. The CAKE Foundation seeks to "empower families through economic development, education, and healthcare". The second, The Kazarian Foundation, furthers similar goals. It announced a Knowledge Partnership with American India Foundation as part of a Knowledge Partnership initiative.

Kazarian was also committee chairman for a 2010 Singapore Heritage Celebration and on January 10, 2011, Kazarian delivered the opening address for a Knowledge Partnership for the Ministry of Foreign Affairs and the Singapore Cooperation Programme. Kazarian is involved with the Asia Society, for which co-chaired the 2011 Awards Dinner. He also chaired the American India Foundation's fifth annual Spring Awards Gala on April 30, 2008 in New York City.

== See also ==
- List of Bates College people
- List of Brown University people
- List of Columbia University people
- List of venture capitalists
