= Robert McAfee =

Robert McAfee may refer to:

- Robert B. McAfee (1784–1849), American diplomat, historian and politician
- Robert E. McAfee (1935–2023), American surgeon and physician

== See also ==
- Robert McAfee Brown (1920–2001), American Presbyterian minister, theologian, and activist
