= Louis Sullivan (disambiguation) =

Louis Sullivan (1856–1924) was an American Modernist architect.

Louis Sullivan may also refer to:

- Louis Wade Sullivan (born 1933), American physician; former Secretary, Department of Health and Human Services
- Lou Sullivan (1951–1991), American transgender activist
- Louis R. Sullivan (1892–1925), American anthropologist
