= William Dill =

William Dill may refer to:

- William L. Dill, American jurist and politician in New Jersey
- William Rankin Dill, American academic administrator, president of Babson College
