= Stephen Arthur Lowell =

American judge

Judge of the Oregon Circuit Court

Personal details
- Born: Stephen Arthur Lowell; January 1, 1859; West Minot, Maine, U.S.
- Died: July 9, 1935 (aged 76)
- Resting place: Pendleton, Oregon

Stephen Arthur Lowell (1859–1935) was an American attorney and jurist who was a circuit judge in Oregon from 1895 to 1900. Born in West Minot, Maine, he graduated from Bates College in Lewiston, Maine in 1882 with a A.B. in political science. Lowell clerked for the Supreme Court of Oregon from 1894 to 1895 before being appointed to the Circuit Court of the State of Oregon, serving from 1895. Previous to his judicial career he was a lawyer in Pendleton, Oregon throughout the 1890s.

== See also ==
- List of Bates College people
