= Margaret Creighton =

American historian

Margaret S. Creighton is an American historian, writer, and professor emerita at Bates College in Maine.

She is the author of many articles, essays and several award-winning books including Rites and Passages: The Experience of American Whaling, 1830-1870 (1995), The Colors of Courage: Gettysburg's Forgotten History: Immigrants, Women, And African Americans in the Civil War's Defining Battle (2005), The Electrifying Fall of Rainbow City: Spectacle and Assassination at the 1901 World's Fair (2016), and with Lisa Norling edited the collection Iron Men, Wooden Women: Gender and Seafaring in the Atlantic World, 1700-1920 (1996).

Creighton has taught courses at Bates College on the American Civil War, women's and gender history, and historical methods. Additionally, she has taught a course on the cultural history of the Boston Red Sox.

== See also ==
- List of Bates College people
- List of historians
- Battle of Gettysburg

== External links and sources ==
- Faculty page
