= Thomas W. Bicknell =

American educator, historian, and author

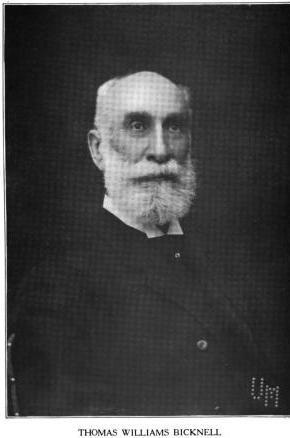
- Born: Thomas Williams Bicknell; September 6, 1834; Barrington, Rhode Island, U.S.
- Died: October 6, 1925 (aged 91); Providence, Rhode Island, U.S.
- Education: Thetford Academy, Vermont; Amherst College; Brown University
- Occupations: Educator; historian; author
- Spouse: Amelia

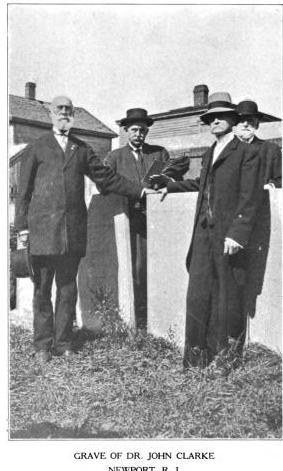
Thomas W. Bicknell and others in front of John Clarke's grave in Newport (from Bicknell's "Story of Dr. John Clarke")

Thomas Williams Bicknell (September 6, 1834 – October 6, 1925) was an American educator, historian, and author.

== Early life and career ==
Thomas W. Bicknell was born in Barrington, Rhode Island, to Harriet Byron Kinnicutt (September 1, 1791 – December 15, 1837), daughter of Josiah Kinnicutt and Rebecca Townsend Kinnicutt, and Rhode Island minister and Senator, Lt.-Col. Allin Bicknell (April 13, 1787 – August 16, 1870), who had served with the Bristol County, Rhode Island Militia. Thomas Bicknell attended Thetford Academy in Vermont and Amherst College in Massachusetts, taught school and became principal in Rehoboth, Massachusetts, then principal in Elgin, Illinois.

When he returned to Rehoboth, serving as principal once again, he earned a master's degree from Brown University. While a senior at Brown, he was elected State Representative in the Rhode Island General Assembly. After graduating from Brown, he became principal of Bristol High School and then Arnold Street Grammar School, then back to Bristol High School.

Rhode Island Governor Seth Padelford (Republican 1869–1873) selected Bicknell to be the Commissioner of Public Schools in 1869. As commissioner, he focused on re-establishing the Normal School (now Rhode Island College). He was a gifted speaker and fundraiser who would triple the amount of money spent on public education; he also established a Rhode Island State Board of Education, oversaw the selection of school superintendents in every town and city in the state, dedicated over 50 new schoolhouses, and increased the school year from 27 to 35 weeks.

== Civil rights reformer ==
In the 1850s, Bicknell signed on to help settle the State of "Free Kansas" to prevent the spread of slavery. On the way to Kansas, he was taken hostage by bandits on the Missouri River, but after two weeks as a prisoner, sharpshooters set him adrift.

Bicknell was an equalist, a racial and sexual reformer, and an early advocate for ending Black segregation in schools; he also helped elect the United States' first all-female school board for the town of Tiverton, Rhode Island.

== Heritage and legacy ==
Bicknell joined the Rhode Island Society of the Sons of the American Revolution in 1896 and was the founder of the National Society of the Sons and Daughters of the Pilgrims and Order of the Founders and Patriots of America (1898). He re-established and was the president of the American Institute of Instruction, and was president of the Rhode Island Institute of Instruction and the National Educational Association. He was the president of the New England Publishing Company.

In 1914, wanting to have a town named for him, he offered a 1,000-volume library to any town in Utah that would adopt his name. Two towns vied for the prize, Grayson and Thurber; the two towns compromised, and in 1916 Thurber changed its name to Bicknell, and Grayson took the name of Blanding, the maiden name of Bicknell's wife. The towns then split the library with 500 books to each.

Bicknell and his wife, Amelia, donated $500 to the Rehoboth Antiquarian Society in Rehoboth to establish the Blanding Public Library in memory of Amelia's parents, Christopher and Chloe Blanding.

In addition to education, he was also active in civic activities and the church. He served as commissioner from Rhode Island to the Universal Exposition at Vienna, Austria. He helped establish the U.S. Postal Code system as a member of the 1878 Postal Congress. He served as president in over thirty associations and organizations and was a member in over one hundred. He was president of the International Sunday School Union, the Massachusetts Congregational Sunday School Union, the Chautauqua Teachers' Reading Union, and the New England Sunday School Association.

Thomas W. Bicknell died in Providence, Rhode Island, on October 6, 1925.

== Writings ==
Bicknell was an author, editor, and publisher of the New England Journal of Education (Boston, 1875–1880). He was the author of the six-volume History of Rhode Island and Providence Plantations, the author-publisher of The Governors of Rhode Island, The Dorr War, The Story of the Rhode Island Normal School, and Story of Dr. John Clarke, and the editor-publisher of History and Genealogy of the Bicknell Family and Collateral Lines. As a historian he also contributed to The Bay State Monthly magazine.

Educational offices
Preceded by Joshua Bicknell Chapin	Rhode Island Commissioner of Education; 1869–1875	Succeeded by Thomas B. Stockwell
