= John Strassburger =

American academic administrator

John Strassburger (April 6, 1942 - September 22, 2010) was an American academic administrator who served as the president of Ursinus College from 1994 to 2010. He graduated from Bates College in Lewiston, Maine, the University of Cambridge in England and Princeton University in New Jersey. He successively served as professor of history, dean of the college, and vice president for academic affairs at Knox College before assuming the presidency of Ursinus. He died on September 22, 2010, from prostate cancer.

== See also ==
- List of Bates College people
