= Martin A. Haynes =

American politician (1842–1919)

Martin Alonzo Haynes
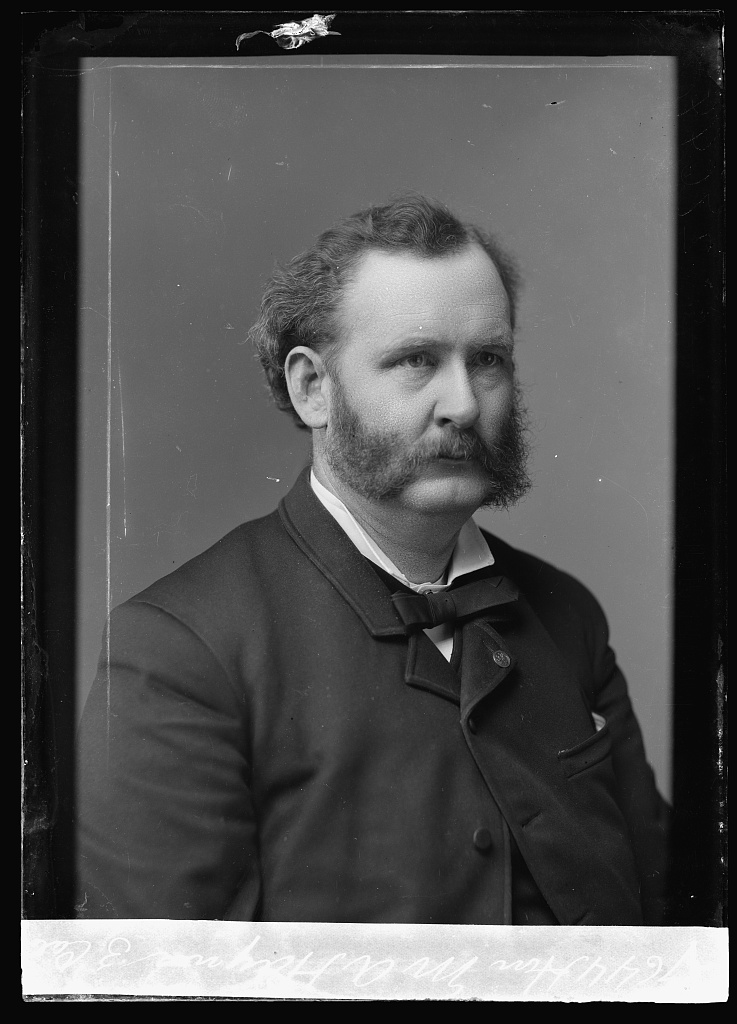

Member of the U.S. House of Representatives from New Hampshire's 1st district
- In office March 4, 1883 – March 3, 1887
- Preceded by: Joshua G. Hall
- Succeeded by: Luther F. McKinney

Member of the New Hampshire House of Representatives
- In office 1872-1873

Personal details
- Born: July 30, 1842 Springfield, New Hampshire, U.S.
- Died: November 28, 1919 (aged 77) Lakeport, New Hampshire, U.S.
- Resting place: Bayside Cemetery; Lakeport, New Hampshire, U.S.
- Party: Republican
- Spouse: Cornelia T. Lane Haynes
- Children: Ruth Ida Haynes; Mary Addie Haynes
- Parent(s): Elbridge Gerry Haynes; Caroline R Knowlton Haynes
- Profession: Printer; Editor; Author; Politician

Military service
- Branch/service: Union Army
- Years of service: 1861-1864
- Rank: Private
- Commands: 2nd New Hampshire Volunteer Regiment
- Battles/wars: Civil War

Martin Alonzo Haynes (July 30, 1842 – November 28, 1919) was an American politician and a United States Representative from New Hampshire.

== Early life ==
Born in Springfield, Sullivan County, New Hampshire, Haynes moved with his parents to Manchester, Hillsborough County, New Hampshire in 1846. He attended the common schools and apprenticed to the printer's trade. At the outbreak of the Civil War, he enlisted in June 1861 in the Union Army as a private in the Second New Hampshire Regiment and served three years. He published a memoir of the war, A Minor War History, consisting of letters to his fiancée.

== Career ==
Haynes moved to Lakeport, Belknap County, New Hampshire in 1868, where he established the Lake Village Times, published every Saturday. He was publisher and editor for twenty years.

Haynes served as member of the New Hampshire House of Representatives in 1872 and 1873. He served as clerk of the supreme court for Belknap County, 1876-1883. He was president of the New Hampshire Veterans' Association in 1881 and 1882, and was department commander of the Grand Army of the Republic in 1881 and 1882.

Elected as a Republican to the Forty-eighth and Forty-ninth Congresses, Haynes served as United States Representative for the state of New Hampshire from (March 4, 1883 – March 3, 1887). He was an unsuccessful candidate for reelection in 1886 to the Fiftieth Congress.

Haynes was an internal-revenue agent of the Treasury, from 1890 to 1893 and from 1898 to 1912. He established the internal-revenue service in the Philippine Islands.

== Death ==
Haynes died in Lakeport, New Hampshire, on November 28, 1919, (age 77 years, 121 days). He is interred at Bayside Cemetery, Lakeport, New Hampshire.

== Family life ==
Son of Elbridge Gerry and Caroline R Knowlton Haynes, he married Cornelia T. Lane on March 9, 1863 in Springfield, New Hampshire and they had two children, Ruth Ida Haynes and Mary Addie Haynes.

U.S. House of Representatives
Preceded by Joshua G. Hall	U.S. Representative for the 1st District of New Hampshire; March 4, 1883 – March 3, 1887	Succeeded by Luther F. McKinney
