= Meredith Burrill =

American geographer and cartographer

Meredith Frederic Burill (December 23, 1902 – October 5, 1997) was an American geographer and cartographer who served as the executive secretary of the United States Board on Geographic Names from 1943 to 1973. Dubbed "the world's foremost authority" on toponymy, he pushed the United Nations to standardize the naming of international bodies of water, most notably Lake Geneva.

== Early life and education ==
Born and raised in Houlton, Maine, the son of a school superintendent, he attended Bates College in Lewiston majoring in geography. He went on to attend Clark University where he received his masters and doctorate in the same field.

== Personal life ==
Born with a traditionally feminine name, "Meredith", Burill casually went by Pete (derived from the French word "petit") as a nickname.

== See also ==
- List of Bates College people
