= Joshua G. Hall =

American politician (1828–1898)

Joshua Gilman Hall
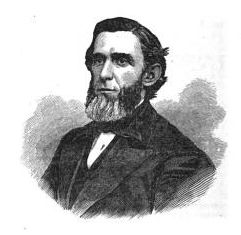

Member of the U.S. House of Representatives from New Hampshire's 1st district
- In office March 4, 1879 – March 3, 1883
- Preceded by: Frank Jones
- Succeeded by: Martin Alonzo Haynes

Mayor of Dover, New Hampshire
- In office 1866–1867
- Preceded by: William E. Estes
- Succeeded by: Eli V. Brewster

Member of the New Hampshire House of Representatives
- In office 1874

Member of the New Hampshire Senate
- In office 1871-1872

Personal details
- Born: November 5, 1828 Wakefield, New Hampshire, U.S.
- Died: October 31, 1898 (aged 69) Dover, New Hampshire, U.S.
- Resting place: Pine Hill Cemetery
- Party: Republican
- Spouse: Susan E Bigelow Hall
- Children: Grace B Hall Cook; Susan Gertrude Hall Sawyer; Dwight Hall
- Parent(s): Joshua G. Hall; Betsey Plumer
- Education: Dartmouth College

Joshua Gilman Hall (November 5, 1828 – October 31, 1898) was an American politician and a U.S. Representative from New Hampshire.

== Early life ==
Born in Wakefield, Carroll Counthy, New Hampshire, Hall attended Gilmanton Academy, and in 1851 was graduated from Dartmouth College in Hanover. He studied law with Daniel M. Christie and was admitted to the bar in 1855, practicing in Wakefield and Dover, New Hampshire.

== Career ==
Hall served as solicitor of Strafford County, 1862–1874, and as mayor of Dover in 1866 and 1867. He was a member of the New Hampshire Senate in 1871 and 1872, and he served in the New Hampshire House of Representatives in 1874. He was the United States Attorney for the District of New Hampshire from April 1874 to February 1879.

Elected as a Republican to the Forty-sixth and Forty-seventh Congresses, Hall was United States Representative for the state of New Hampshire from (March 4, 1879 – March 3, 1883). Subsequently, he resumed the practice of law.

== Death ==
Hall died in Dover, Strafford County, New Hampshire on October 31, 1898 (age 69 years, 360 days). He is interred at Pine Hill Cemetery in Dover.

== Family life ==
On November 16, 1861, Hall married S. Lizzie Bigelow and they had three children, Grace, Susan, and Dwight.

U.S. House of Representatives
| Preceded by Frank Jones | Member of the U.S. House of Representatives from New Hampshire's 1st congressional district March 4, 1879–March 3, 1883 | Succeeded by Martin Alonzo Haynes |
