= Walter Ranger =

American educator (1855–1941)

Rhode Island Commissioner of Education
- In office 1905–1935
- Preceded by: Thomas B. Stockwell
- Succeeded by: James F. Rockett

Vermont Superintendent of Education
- In office 1900–1905
- Preceded by: Mason S. Stone
- Succeeded by: Mason S. Stone

Personal details
- Born: November 22, 1855; Wilton, Maine, US
- Died: November 4, 1941 (aged 85); Laconia, New Hampshire, US
- Resting place: Evergreen Cemetery, Portland, Maine
- Political party: Republican
- Spouses: Mary Snowman (m. 1879; died 1885); Mabel C. Bemis (m. 1889)
- Children: 5
- Education: Bates College (AB, AM, LLB); University of Vermont (AM)
- Profession: Educator

Walter Eugene Ranger (November 22, 1855 – November 4, 1941) was an American academic administrator who served as the president of Johnson State College in Vermont and was commissioner of education in Vermont and Rhode Island.

== Early life ==
Ranger was born on November 22, 1855 in Wilton, Maine. He was the seventh son and fourteenth child of Peter and Eliza (Smith) Ranger. He attended common school and prepared for college at the Wilton Academy. He earned his bachelor's (1879) and Master of Arts (1883), and Bachelor of Laws (1907) degrees from Bates College as well as a Master of Arts degree from the University of Vermont (1902).

== Career ==
Ranger was the principal of the Nichols Latin School in Lewiston, Maine during the 1879–80 school year. He then served as the principal Lenox High School in Lenox, Massachusetts until 1883. From 1883 to 1896, he was the principal of the Lyndon Institute. Under his leadership, the school grew from 53 students and four teachers to 245 students and ten teachers.

From 1896 to 1900, Ranger was the principal of the Johnson State Normal School. In 1900, he was unanimously elected state superintendent of public instruction by the Vermont General Assembly. He then served as Rhode Island's commissioner of education from 1905 until his retirement in 1935.

== Personal life ==
In 1879, Ranger married Mary Snowman of Portland, Maine. They had two children who both predeceased Ranger. Mary Ranger died in 1885. In 1889, he married Mabel C. Bemis of Lyndonville, Vermont. They had two sons and one daughter.

Ranger was a Congregationalist, a member of the Republican Party, and a 33rd degree Mason who once served as grand master of the Grand Lodge of Vermont. In 1881, he and four classmates purchased Garnet Point, a summer colony in Moultonborough, New Hampshire.

Ranger died on November 4, 1941 in Laconia, New Hampshire after a three-week illness.

== See also ==
- List of Bates College people
