= Justin Freeman (skier) =

American cross-country skier

Justin Karl Freeman is an American academic, teacher, and former Nordic skier who represented the United States during the 2006 Winter Olympics. He attended Bates College in Lewiston, Maine where he majored in physics and mathematics, graduating in 1998. He went on to briefly attend the University of Colorado at Boulder for graduate school before being called to compete for the United States Ski Team for the upcoming nationals and olympics in 2006. He previously worked at The American School of the Hauge in the Netherlands and Nova International School in North Macedonia for the 2021-2022 academic year. He now works at Kimball Union Academy, in Plainfield, New Hampshire.

== See also ==
- List of Bates College people
