= Douglas Hodgkin =

American political scientist and author

- Born: Douglas Irving Hodgkin; Lewiston, Maine, U.S.
- Education: Yale University; Duke University

Douglas Irving Hodgkin is an American political scientist and author. He is a professor emeritus of politics at Bates College in Lewiston, Maine.

== Biography ==
Hodgkin was born in Lewiston, Maine. Hodgkin received his B.A. from Yale University and his M.A. and Ph.D. from Duke University. Hodgkin taught for 34 years at Bates, retired in 2000 at the age of 61. He remains an emeritus professor at Bates.

He wrote books on Lewiston history, including Frontier to Industrial City and Lewiston Politics in the Gilded Age. In 2005, Hodgkin published Fractured Family, a short book on the Maine courts. While a professor, Hodgkin was an activist with the Maine Republican Party. He has been a long-time member of the Androscoggin Historical Society board of directors and of the Lewiston Historic Preservation Review Board.

== See also ==
- List of Yale University people
- List of Duke University people
- List of Bates College people
