= Luther F. McKinney =

American politician (1841–1922)

Luther Franklin McKinney
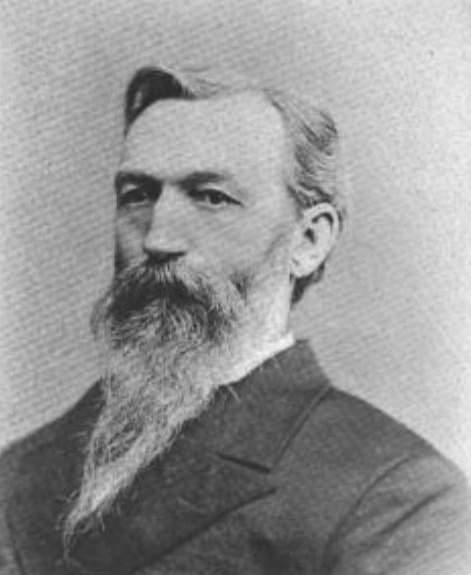

United States Ambassador to Colombia
- In office July 17, 1893 – December 6, 1896
- Appointed by: Grover Cleveland
- Preceded by: John T. Abbott
- Succeeded by: Charles Burdett Hart

Member of the U.S. House of Representatives from New Hampshire's 1st district
- In office March 4, 1891 – March 3, 1893
- Preceded by: Alonzo Nute
- Succeeded by: Henry William Blair

Member of the U.S. House of Representatives from New Hampshire's 1st district
- In office March 4, 1887 – March 3, 1889
- Preceded by: Martin Alonzo Haynes
- Succeeded by: Alonzo Nute

Personal details
- Born: April 25, 1841 Newark, Ohio, U.S.
- Died: July 30, 1922 (aged 81) Bridgton, Maine, U.S.
- Resting place: Forest Hill Cemetery
- Party: Democratic

Military service
- Branch/service: Union Army
- Years of service: August 5, 1861, - February 1863
- Rank: Sergeant
- Commands: Company D, 1st Ohio Cavalry Regiment
- Battles/wars: Civil War

Luther Franklin McKinney (April 25, 1841 – July 30, 1922) was a U.S. representative from New Hampshire.

Born in Newark, Ohio, McKinney attended common and private schools. He taught school for a while. When the Civil War began, he enlisted in Company D, 1st Ohio Cavalry Regiment, serving from August 5, 1861, until February 1863, where he became a sergeant. He moved to Iowa in 1865, where he engaged in agricultural pursuits and also taught school until 1867.

He graduated from St. Lawrence University, Canton, New York, June 30, 1870, and moved to Bridgton, Maine, in 1871, where he was ordained a pastor of the Universalist Church. He moved to Newfields, New Hampshire, in 1873, and subsequently, in 1875, to Manchester, pursuing his ministerial duties in both places. He was an unsuccessful candidate for election in 1884 to the Forty-ninth Congress.

McKinney was elected as a Democrat to the Fiftieth Congress (March 4, 1887 – March 3, 1889). He was an unsuccessful candidate for reelection in 1888 to the Fifty-first Congress. He was elected to the Fifty-second Congress (March 4, 1891 – March 3, 1893), but was not a candidate for renomination in 1892, when instead he was an unsuccessful candidate for Governor of New Hampshire.

He was the United States Minister to Colombia from 1893 to 1897, then returned to Bridgton, Maine, where he engaged in the furniture business. He served as member of the State house of representatives in 1907 and 1908. He was again pastor of the Universalist Church at Bridgton, where he served until his death on July 30, 1922. He was interred in Forest Hill Cemetery.

Party political offices
Preceded by Charles H. Amsden	Democratic nominee for Governor of New Hampshire; 1892	Succeeded by Henry O. Kent
Diplomatic posts
Preceded by John T. Abbott	United States Ambassador to Colombia; July 17, 1893 - December 6, 1896	Succeeded by Charles Burdett Hart
U.S. House of Representatives
Preceded by Martin Alonzo Haynes	Member of the U.S. House of Representatives from New Hampshire's 1st congressional district March 4, 1887 – March 3, 1889	Succeeded by Alonzo Nute
Preceded by Alonzo Nute	Member of the U.S. House of Representatives from New Hampshire's 1st congressional district March 4, 1891 – March 3, 1893	Succeeded by Henry William Blair
