= Thomas B. Stockwell =

American official and author (1839–1906)

Thomas Blanchard Stockwell (1839–1906) was an important citizen of Rhode Island, serving for thirty years as the Eighth Commissioner of Public Schools.

He was the son of Amos W. Stockwell and Susan Le Baron March. He was born in Worcester, Massachusetts, on July 6, 1839. He attended Chicopee High School, and graduated from Brown University in 1862. He also received an M.A. in 1865.

Stockwell service as Commissioner of Public Schools in Rhode Island began in 1874.

He is most notable for his book, A history of public education in Rhode Island, from 1636 to 1876. He was also the author of a book on laws related to education.

He served as the acting principal of Rhode Island College from 1883 to 1884.

He is noted for his writing on the choice of the violet as the state flower of Rhode Island in 1898.

He served as a deacon of the Central Congregational Church in Providence, Rhode Island.

Educational offices
Preceded by Thomas W. Bicknell	Rhode Island Commissioner of Education; 1875–1905	Succeeded by Walter Ranger
