= Alonzo Nute =

American politician (1826–1892)

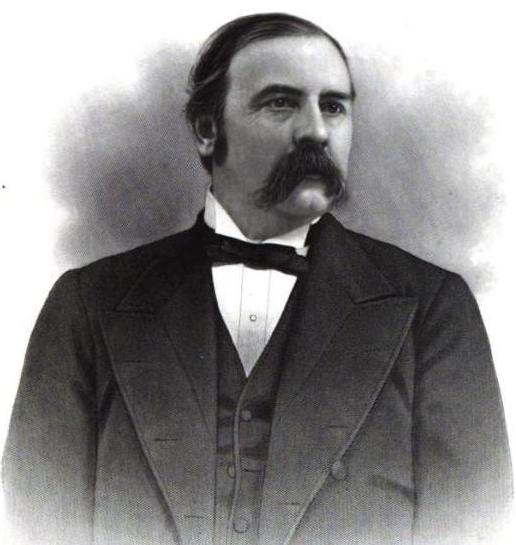

Member of the U.S. House of Representatives from New Hampshire's 1st district
- In office March 4, 1889 – March 3, 1891
- Preceded by: Luther F. McKinney
- Succeeded by: Luther F. McKinney

Member of the New Hampshire Senate
- In office 1867-1868

Member of the New Hampshire House of Representatives
- In office 1866

Personal details
- Born: February 12, 1826 Milton, New Hampshire, U.S.
- Died: December 24, 1892 (aged 66) Farmington, New Hampshire, U.S.
- Party: Republican

Military service
- Branch/service: Union Army
- Commands: 6th New Hampshire Infantry Regiment
- Battles/wars: Civil War

Alonzo Nute (February 12, 1826 – December 24, 1892) was a United States representative from New Hampshire. He was born in Milton, New Hampshire where he attended the common schools. He moved to Natick, Massachusetts in 1842 but returned to New Hampshire in 1848 and engaged in the manufacture of boots and shoes in Farmington. In the spring of 1861, he entered the Union Army in the 6th New Hampshire Infantry Regiment during the Civil War.

Nute served as a member of the New Hampshire House of Representatives in 1866 after the war. He also served in the New Hampshire Senate in 1867 and 1868. In addition, he was a delegate to the Republican National Convention in 1876. He was elected as a Republican to the Fifty-first Congress (March 4, 1889 – March 3, 1891) but was not a candidate for renomination in 1890. He died in Farmington in 1892 and was buried in Pine Grove Cemetery.

U.S. House of Representatives
Preceded by Luther F. McKinney	U.S. Representative for the 1st District of New Hampshire; March 4, 1889 – March 3, 1891	Succeeded by Luther F. McKinney
