= John P. Swasey =

American politician (1839–1928)

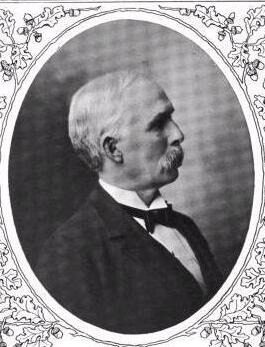
John P. Swasey

John Philip Swasey (September 4, 1839 – May 27, 1928) was U.S. Representative from Maine from 1908 to 1911.

== Biography ==
Swasey was born in Canton, Maine on September 4, 1839, and attended the Canton public schools, Dearborn Academy, Hebron Academy, Maine State Seminary (Bates College), and Tufts College. During the American Civil War, he served as a first lieutenant in Company K, Seventeenth Regiment, Maine Volunteer Infantry in the Union Army. In 1863 Swasey became an attorney in Canton, Maine where he later served as a county attorney, state legislator, and revenue assessor. Swasey was elected on November 3, 1908, as a Republican to the Sixtieth Congress to fill the vacancy caused by the resignation of Charles E. Littlefield and was elected to the Sixty-first Congress and served from November 3, 1908, to March 3, 1911. Swasey died on May 27, 1928, and was buried in Pine Grove Cemetery.

== See also ==
- List of Bates College people

U.S. House of Representatives
Preceded by Charles E. Littlefield	Member of the U.S. House of Representatives from Maine's 2nd congressional district November 3, 1908 – March 3, 1911	Succeeded by Daniel J. McGillicuddy
