= The Hedge Fund Journal =

The Heft Fund Journal
- Categories: Business magazine
- Frequency: Monthly
- First issue: September 2004
- Country: United Kingdom
- Language: English
- Website: www.thehedgefundjournal.com

The Hedge Fund Journal is a monthly magazine focusing on the global hedge fund industry.

== Description ==
The Hedge Fund Journal was formed in 2004 by Publisher Rod Sparks, a former industry lawyer, and is based in Mayfair, London, UK. The magazine consists of feature articles, original and contributed research, opinion and legal pieces, as well as strategy commentary from hedge fund managers. Its annual features include a ranking of the top 50 European hedge fund managers called The Europe 50, 50 Leading Women In Hedge Funds in association with EY, and Tomorrow's Titans, a report on rising star hedge fund managers. In 2024 a new special report called Private Markets:50 Women Leaders was published in association with Citco. Since 2006, The Hedge Fund Journal has hosted an annual awards ceremony, to recognise the leading service providers to the European hedge fund industry. Performance award events include specialist rankings for UCITS Hedge funds; CTAs and Discretionary Traders; Digital Currencies and Private and Alternative Credit. Managers recognised in these awards include both emerging managers and some of the industry's giants. Another series of articles, "50 Giants Across 5 Decades" has interviewed and profiled the founders of Bridgewater, Aspect Capital, Hildene Capital, Capital Fund Management, Graham Capital and Deltroit Capital.

== See also ==
- Trade journal
