= Waterville Public Library =

Library in Maine

Coordinates: 44.552°N 69.6317°W

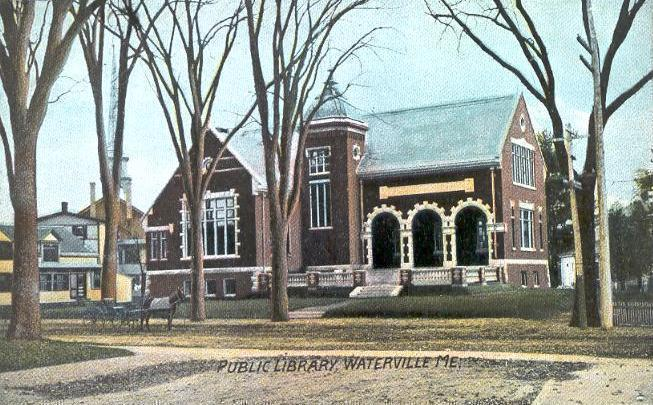
- Location: Waterville, Maine, United States
- Type: Public
- Established: 1896

Collection
- Size: 75,000

Access and use
- Circulation: 155,000
- Population served: 15,722

Other information
- Budget: $555,783
- Director: Sarah Sugden
- Employees: 20
- Website: https://www.watervillelibrary.org

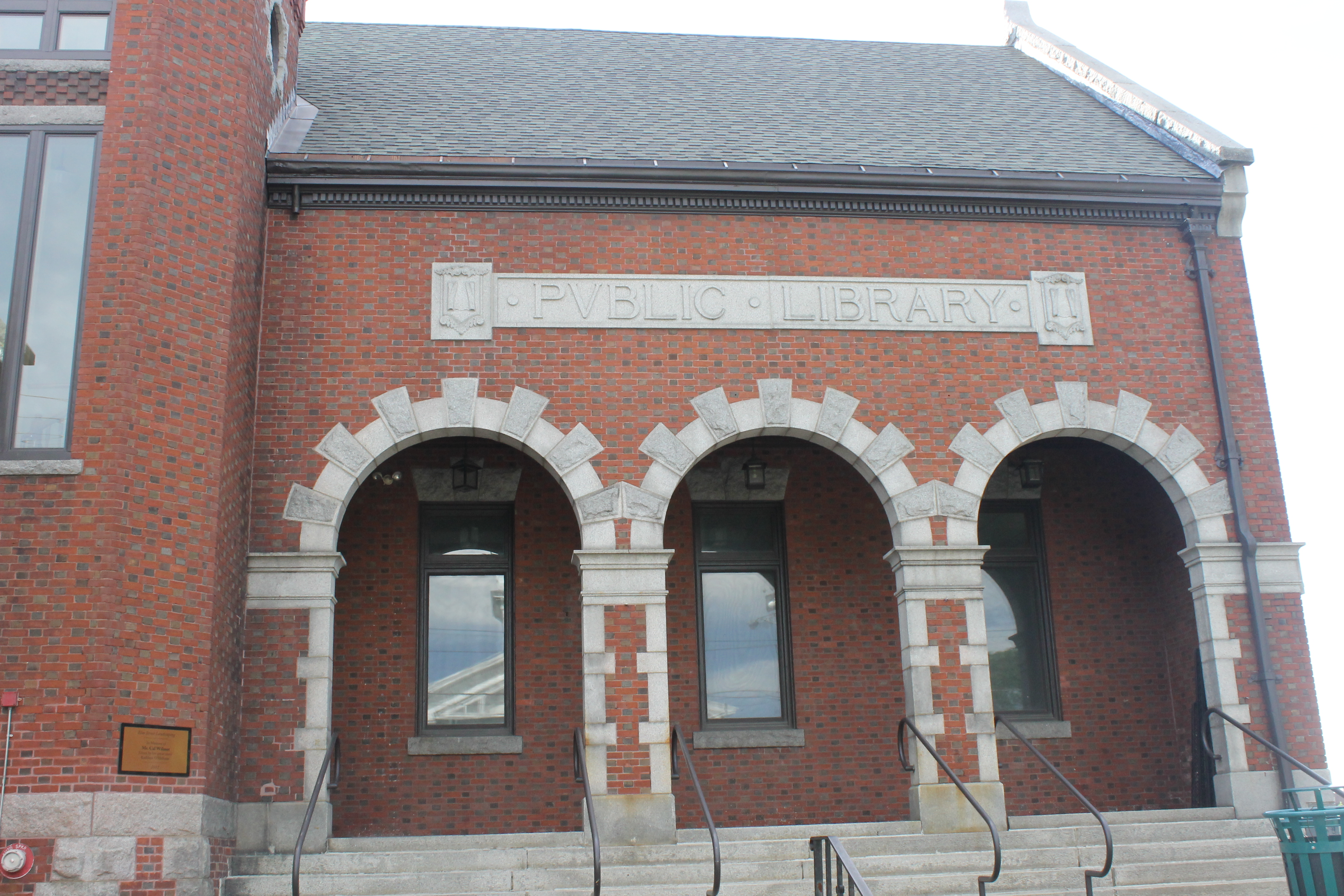
The Waterville Public Library is located at 73 Elm Street across from the First Baptist Church.

The Waterville Public Library is the public library serving Waterville, Maine.
