= William Rankin Dill =

American academic administrator (1930–2026)

William Rankin Dill (August 18, 1930 – March 31, 2026) was an American academic administrator who served as the president of Babson College from 1981 to 1989. He graduated from Bates College in Lewiston, Maine and the Carnegie Institute of Technology. Born in Sewickley, Pennsylvania he became a faculty member Carnegie-Mellon University in Pittsburgh from 1955 to 1965. Dill died in Auburndale, Massachusetts on March 31, 2026, at the age of 95.

== See also ==
- List of Bates College people
