= US Universities Debating Championship =

Debate tournament

The US Universities Debating Championship (USUDC) is the largest British Parliamentary debating tournament in the United States, and one of the largest debate tournaments in the world. The event is held for college and university students attending school in the United States, and is hosted by a different university each year. The host is selected by the member schools of the US Universities Debate Association. The event determines the National Champions for the year.

Most recently the tournament was hosted by University of California, Los Angeles in November 2026, representing the championship for the 2026-2027 academic year. The current National Champions are Soren Jensen & Eamin Ahmed from Cornell University. The Novice (first year) division was won by Alex Wang & Ziming Li from University of Pennsylvania.

== Format ==
USUDC is held in a format based on the World Universities Debating Championship. The tournament is held in April, before most American colleges hold their final exams. In recent years about 180 teams have competed at the tournament. Since 2015, only students registered at an American college or university may compete in playoff rounds and be made National Champion, but students from foreign schools can still compete. Before 2015, foreign schools were allowed to compete in playoffs, resulting in a 2012 championship where separate tournament champions and national champions were crowned.

Each team consists of two students from the same college or university. In a given debate they will compete against three other teams simultaneously. A motion is given to the teams fifteen minutes before the debate. Two teams are assigned to defend the motion while the other two teams are to oppose it. The teams are judged by a panel of judges, who rank them from first place to fourth place based on respective contributions and assign scores to each person based on the quality of their speech. Coming first, second, third, or fourth in a round is awarded with progressively fewer points. In a debate, teams typically go against teams with a similar record as themselves. For example, if a team had six points after three rounds, then they would expect to compete against other teams with six points in the fourth round.

After six or eight preliminary rounds there is a "break," announced at the banquet on the second day, where the top thirty-two teams progress to the third day. On day three, rounds are elimination rounds, where the bottom two teams in a round do not progress. Rounds progress through octofinals, then quarterfinals, semifinals, and finals, where the National Champion is named. Seeding for octofinals is based on the cumulative points the team had at the end of preliminary rounds.

Novices teams consisting of students in their first year of collegiate debate have a separate break to novice quarterfinals or semifinals should they not make the open octofinals. A subsequent novice final then crowns the Novice Champion.

=== Scoring system ===
In contrast with most major BP tournaments such as WUDC, USUDC is notable in that since 2020 it has used a tapered scoring system for preliminary rounds, awarding different multiples of the "3, 2, 1, 0" point scheme depending on the round. For instance, in early preliminary rounds first place receives six points, second place receives four points, third place receives two points, and fourth place receives none, whereas in later rounds, first receives three points, second, two, third, one, and fourth, zero. This system seeks to remedy an inherent flaw in the standard BP points and matchup system, formally analyzed in a 2020 paper by Barnes et al.:

Because of the scoring in BP, teams competing in lower rooms often score enough points to advance on the tab above a large number of teams who were competing in higher rooms. This leap-frogging over other teams in higher rooms is widely acknowledged, though people may not fully understand how disruptive this is to getting an accurate ordering on the tab.

— R. Eric Barnes, Paul Kehle, Nick McKenny, and Chuan-Zheng Lee, "Break Accuracy: Optimizing the Sorting Power of Preliminary Rounds Using Tapered Points", International Debate Magazine (2020)

The problem of sorting teams based on skill in order to generate a fair break is compared by the authors to the Brazil nut effect, where the largest nuts in a package of mixed nuts rise to the top of the container during transport because of shaking. Laboratory experiments have shown that shaking equally vigorously throughout the process is less effective than gradually decreasing the vigorousness over time, because applying as much force at a nearly-sorted state as was applied initially disrupts the more sorted state. The analysis by Barnes et al. shows that this phenomenon is analogous to standard BP scoring and that many variations of tapered scoring systems—where the amount of points awarded decreases with each preliminary round—significantly outperform the standard of equal points across rounds in producing skill-accurate breaks.

== US Universities Debate Association ==
The US Universities Debate Association (USUDA) is the body which governs USUDC. It was founded in 2013 in order to organize the British Parliamentary debate circuit in the United States. They select the host for the next USUDC each year. Membership in the USUDA is open to all colleges and universities in the United States.

== Tournaments by Year ==
Harvard has won the Championship five times, Yale, Stanford and Princeton twice, and no other school more than once. In 2018, Harvard became the first school to successfully defend the title. In 2023, Xiao-ke Lu became the first person to win the Championship more than once. This feat was repeated by Tejas Subramaniam the following year.

Academic Year	Host Institution	National Champion	Finalist Teams	Top Speaker	Topic of Open Grand Final
2026	University of California, Los Angeles	Soren Jensen & Eamin Ahmed, Cornell University	Shayor Khan & Justin Zhou, University of California, Berkeley; Maria Xu & Stephanie Chen, Harvard University; Amy Chang & Benjamin Thomas, Stanford University	Elizabeth Li, Stanford University	This house prefers a baseline-value view of life over a peak-value view of life.
2025	University of Pennsylvania	Clement Tsao & Karthik Palakodeti, University of Pennsylvania	Maria Xu & Stephanie Chen, Harvard University; Eamin Ahmed & Soren Jensen, Cornell University; Ollie Braden & Rahul Kalavagunta, Princeton University	Elizabeth Li, Stanford University	This house believes that it would have been in Mexico’s interests for the Mexican government to pursue industrial policy followed by gradual liberalization rather than join NAFTA.
2024	Dartmouth College	Tejas Subramaniam & Elizabeth Li, Stanford University	Manav Mittal & Manuel Machorro, Bates College; Ambika Grover & Stephanie Chen, Harvard University; Molly Callaghan & Catherine Liu, Harvard University	Tejas Subramaniam, Stanford University	This house believes that the United States should dissolve its non-nuclear offensive military capabilities
2023	Hobart and William Smith Colleges	Jacquelynn Lin & Xiao-ke Lu, Princeton University	Matt Mauriello & Annushka Agarwal, Harvard University; Muzamil Godil & Justin Wu, Johns Hopkins University; Kaustubh Jain & Sheryar Ahmad, Princeton University	Xiao-ke Lu, Princeton University	TH, as a moderate coalition of Democratic members of the US House of Representatives, would support a moderate Republican for Speaker of the House
2022	Hobart and William Smith Colleges	Arthur Lee & Tejas Subramaniam, Stanford University	Jane Mentzinger & Greg Weaving, Princeton University; Matt Song & Michael Ning, Yale University; Rohan Kapoor & Benny Nicholson, University of Chicago	Greg Weaving, Princeton University & Tejas Subramaniam, Stanford University	THW abolish peer review
2021 (Note: The 2021 Penn USUDC was canceled after reports of racism and mistreatment against Black debaters from Morehouse College, led by Ken Newby, Dan Edwards, and Caleb Strickland prompted a protest and withdrawal of a number of participating teams.)	University of Pennsylvania	Canceled			
2020 (Note: The University of Chicago was originally scheduled to host in April 2020, but this event was cancelled due to the COVID-19 pandemic. Hobart and William Smith Colleges hosted a delayed, online edition in October 2020.)	Hobart and William Smith Colleges	Xiao-ke Lu & Greg Weaving, Princeton University	Jay Gibbs & Jaewan Park, University of Chicago; Devesh Kodnani & Brian Li, University of Chicago; Preston Johnston & Shreyas Kumar, Princeton University	Anish Welde, University of Pennsylvania	This house believes that it is in the interest of the US to take measures to significantly reduce its economic ties and connections with China (e.g. reducing investment and redirecting trade, and shifting away from yuan in its reserve currency basket)
2019	Clemson University	Jenny Jiao & Salil Mitra, Duke University	Aditya Dhar & Michel Nehme, Harvard University; Ko Lyn Cheang & Lorenzo Pinasco, Yale University; Harry Meadows & Abby Westberry, Bates College	Ko Lyn Cheang, Yale University	
2018	Stanford University	Vedant Bahl & Mars He, Harvard University	Benjamin Muschol & Will Smith, Northeastern University; Harry Elliott & Bobbi Leet, Stanford University; William Arnesen & Charlie Barton, Yale University	Harry Elliott, Stanford University	This house regrets the popularization of the idea that one's identity should determine the credibility of one's perspective on social justice issues
2017	Regis University & University of Denver	Archie Hall & Alex Wu, Harvard University	David Slater & Elana Leone, Stanford University; Harry Elliot & Bobbi Leet, Stanford University; Daniel Stoyell & Rebecca Blair, Cornell University	Zoë Seaman-Grant, Bates College	This house would immediately cease all financial and military support for the war on drugs, deprioritize domestic drug enforcement, and re-purpose all funds currently spent on those ends on reparations for those negatively affected by current policy
2016	Morehouse College	Drew Latimer & Jeremy Chen, Tufts University	Dhruva Bhat & Danny DeBois, Harvard University; Evan Lynyak & Henry Zhang, Yale University; Harry Elliott & Taahir Munshi, Stanford University	Harry Elliott, Stanford University	This house believes that until the Democratic Party establishment commits to fielding and funding African-Americans as candidates at a rate proportional to their share of the overall party membership - roughly 1 in 4 at present - African-Americans should boycott the vote
2015	University of Alaska, Anchorage	Tony Nguyen & Edwin Zhang, Yale University	Tiffany Keung & Alex Mechanick, Brown University; Fanele Mashwama & Bo Seo Harvard University; Rodjé Malcolm & Emanuel Waddell, Morehouse College	Matt Summers, Bates College	This house would, as the US government, grant amnesty to all undocumented immigrants living in the United States on the sole condition that they have not been convicted of a violent criminal offense
2014	Purdue University	Taylor Blackburn & Jac Stewart, Bates College	Kirat Singh & Srinath Reddy, Cornell University; Colin Etnire & Krikor Kouyoumdjian, Loyola Marymount University; Michael Barton & Sam Ward-Packard, Yale University	Michael Barton, Yale University & Sam Ward-Packard Yale University	This House regrets the continuation of NATO after the dissolution of the Soviet Union
2013	University of La Verne	Ben Kornfeld & Sam Ward-Packard, Yale University	Chris Axtman & Megan Towles, Carroll College; Colin Etnire & Dearv O’Crowley Loyola Marymount University; Emma Pierson & Andrew Suciu, Stanford University	Ben Kornfeld, Yale University	
2012 (Note: In 2012, at Willamette, a team from Ireland won the Grand Final. In the event, the judging panel selected as National Champions the best team representing an American institution in the final, while the Irish were declared Tournament Champions.)	Willamette University	Tournament Champions: Christine Simpson & Michael O’Dwyer, University College Dublin; National Champions: Buzz Klinger & Will McConnell, Hobart and William Smith Colleges	Maxwell Dovala & Kate Falkenstein, Yale University; Kamya Chandra & Nipun Mahajan, St. John's University	Sam Ward-Packard, Yale University	This House believes that coming cuts in US military spending will make the world a better place
2011	University of Vermont	Cormac Early & Jo Box, Harvard University	Sarah Carpenter & Amie Stanley, University of Alaska, Anchorage; Maxwell Dovala & Kate Falkenstein, Yale University; Angela Kintominas & David Maher (Note: Prior to 2015, international institutions were allowed to compete in elimination rounds at the USUDC.), University of New South Wales	Cormac Early, Harvard University	
2010	Regis University & University of Denver	Charlie Sprague & Jesse Katz-Blumenthal, Claremont Colleges	Aaron Baker & Lindsay Bing, Portland State University; Alex Campbell & Anish Mitra, Stanford University; Nate Blevins & Naz El-Khatib, Yale University	Colin Haughey, University of Alaska, Anchorage	
2009	University of Vermont	Lewis Bollard & Ben Belser, Harvard University	Mike Aguilera & Kevin Kiley, Loyola Marymount University; Robert Embree & Monica Ferris, Hart House; Doug Cochran & Daniel Warrents, Middle Temple	Daniel Warrents, Middle Temple	
2008	Portland State University	Alexander Schwab & Kevin Kiley, Loyola Marymount University	Charles Sprague & Kari Wohlschlegel, Claremont Colleges; Rob Ruiz & Thomas Allison, University of La Verne; Michael Imeson & James Kilcup, Seattle University	Kari Wohlschlegel Claremont Colleges	
2007	Claremont McKenna College	Josh Martin & Rob Ruiz, University of La Verne	Matt Contreras & Courtney Crooks, Loyola Marymount University; Dan Adler & Eric Sanelle, Portland State University; Brian Kettles and Julie Liztwan, University of Alberta & University of Calgary	Julia Liztwan, University of Alberta	
2006	Claremont McKenna College	Samuel Myat San & Alexander Schwab, Harvard University	Tom Lassen & Chris Kolerok, University of Alaska, Anchorage; Adam Chilton & David Denton, Yale University, Chris Jones & Monica Ferris, Athabasca University	David Denton, Yale University	
2005	Claremont McKenna College	Michael Rose & Tom Lassen, University of Alaska, Anchorage	Chris Kolerok & Rose Helens-Hart, University of Alaska, Anchorage; Martin Pinnes & Daniel Streim, Colgate University; Ashish Sinha & Michael Ferris, University of British Columbia	Josh Martin, University of La Verne	

== See also ==
- World Universities Debating Championship
- North American Debating Championship
- North American University Debating Championship
