= Albert A. Newman =

American businessman

Albert Newman
- Born: Albert Augustus Newman; January 19, 1843; Weld, Maine
- Died: September 5, 1933 (aged 90); Arkansas City, Kansas
- Education: Bates College
- Occupations: Mayor, businessman, banker
- Spouse: Mary M. Houghton

Albert Augustus Newman (January 19, 1843 – September 5, 1933) was an American businessman, merchant and banker who is most known as the founder and president of Newman Dry Goods Company.

He was prominent in Kansas for his widespread business endeavors which lead him become the Mayor of Arkansas City, president of several banks and the principle founder of Newman Dry Goods Company. His business was the largest of its kind in the state. While in the military he held the rank of colonel in the Maine State Militia, and fought in the American Civil War. He is also known for building the first flour mill in Southern Kansas.

== Early life and family history ==
The Newmans traced their roots to the English, and were colonial settlers in Massachusetts. Ebenezer Newman, Albert Newman's grandfather was born in Billerica, Massachusetts, in 1791, and was the son of a soldier who fought in the American Revolution with the Massachusetts troops. Newman's father, Augustus G. Newman, was born in 1821 at Weld, Maine, and died in 1893. Albert Augustus Newman was born in Weld, Maine on January 19, 1843. Newman was the oldest of their five children. He grew up in Weld, and attended the common schools in his birth town, and went on to enroll in Bates College, (then called the Main State Seminary) in Lewiston, Maine.

At nineteen, he left Bates to fight in for the Union in the American Civil War. He enlisted in 1862 in the Tenth Maine Infantry, and went on to the Twenty-ninth Maine Regiment, and served for three terms in the regiment.

While in the Army he fought in Battle of Winchester, Battle of Fisher's Hill, Battle of Cedar Creek, Battle of Antietam, and the Battle of Chancellorsville.

== Career as a merchant ==
Soon after completing his military service, he moved to Fayetteville, Tennessee, to pursue a career in the dry goods business. He stayed in Tennessee for three years before moving to Emporia, Kansas in 1868.

=== Kansas pursuits ===
While in Emporia, he began as a general merchant, and in 1871 moved to Arkansas City, Kansas. In the city he went on to open a general merchandise store, and permanently relocated the following year. Arkansas City was not a fully established city at the time and Newman played a key role in developing it.

==== Newman Dry Goods Co. ====
He went on the found the Newman Dry Goods Company, which was the largest business of its kind in the state. In 1916, the first five-story building for his company was constructed on Adams Avenue and Summit Street.

=== Banking endeavors ===
Newman quickly became a prominent figure in Kansas finance. He was appoint the president of the Cowley County Bank which was the second bank in the city. After serving as its leader he went on to found the Home National Bank.

Hardly less credit is due him for his endeavors in improving and developing the magnificent water power at Arkansas City. His financial and economic influence developed the first flour mill in Southern Kansas, and went on to sell the mill in 1879.

As a prominent banking figure in Kansas he served as director of the City Milling Company, president of the Newman Investment Company, president of the Land and Power Company of Arkansas City.

He founded the Arkansas City Water Company, Arkansas City Gas and Electric Light Company with other close business associates, but sold the utility companies in 1915.

==== Other business pursuits ====
Newman served as the President of the Three K Cattle Company and which controlled over 40,000 acres of land in the Kaw Reservation in Indian Territory.

==== Political career ====
In his first political years in Kansas he was a registered Democrat and over time became a Republican and was a devout Free Will Baptist. He was elected as Mayor of Arkansas City and served for two terms.

=== Personal life and death ===
Newman married Mary M. Houghton in his hometown, in 1869. He died on September 5, 1933, in Arkansas City, Arkansas.
