= Harry Morrison Cheney =

American politician

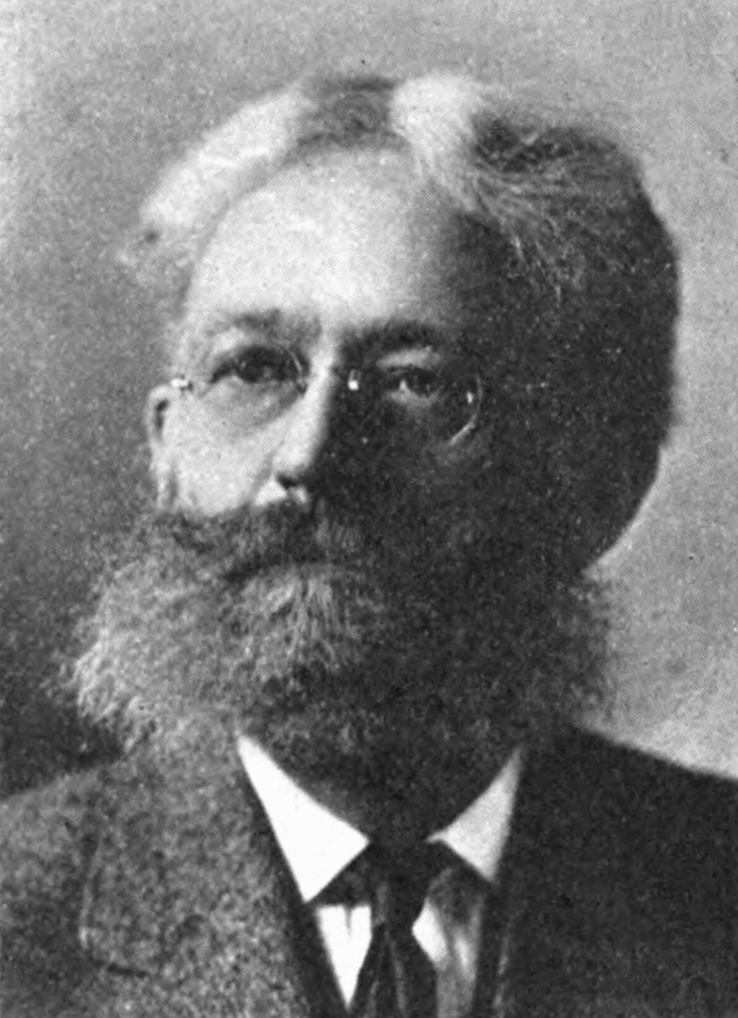

Speaker of the New Hampshire House of Representatives

Personal details
- Born: March 8, 1860 Newport, New Hampshire, U.S.
- Died: January 1, 1937 (aged 76) Concord, New Hampshire, U.S.
- Party: Republican
- Spouse: Mary E. Vose (m. 1893)
- Children: Two
- Education: Bates College
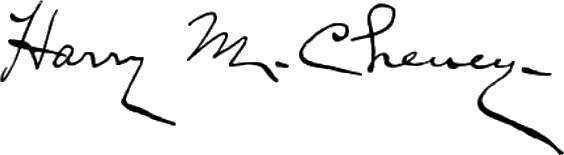
- Signature

Harry Morrison Cheney (March 8, 1860 – January 1, 1937) was a businessman and Speaker of the New Hampshire House of Representatives.

== Biography ==
Cheney was born in Newport, New Hampshire on March 8, 1860, to Elias and Susan (Youngman) Cheney and was a grandson of abolitionist Moses Cheney. Cheney's family moved to Lebanon, New Hampshire, where he attended the schools in Lebanon and then Colby Academy before graduating from Bates College in Maine in 1886 where his uncle Oren Cheney was the college's president and founder. After graduation from Bates Cheney worked as a printer, with his father. When his father accepted an appointment as Consul in Matanzas, Cuba, Harry Cheney took over the printing operation. His family was active in New Hampshire politics with his grandfather and father serving as state legislators and his uncle Person Cheney serving as a U.S. Senator, Governor, and Ambassador. Cheney served several terms as a State Representative and State Senator starting in 1893, including a term as Speaker of the House in 1904. He served as Acting Governor of New Hampshire in 1904 when Governor Batchelder was out of state and certified the electors for President Theodore Roosevelt. Cheney married Mary E. Vose on December 19, 1893, and they had two daughters. He was an active Freemason and member of the Unitarian church.

He died at his home in Concord, New Hampshire on January 1, 1937.
