= Daniel J. McGillicuddy =

American politician

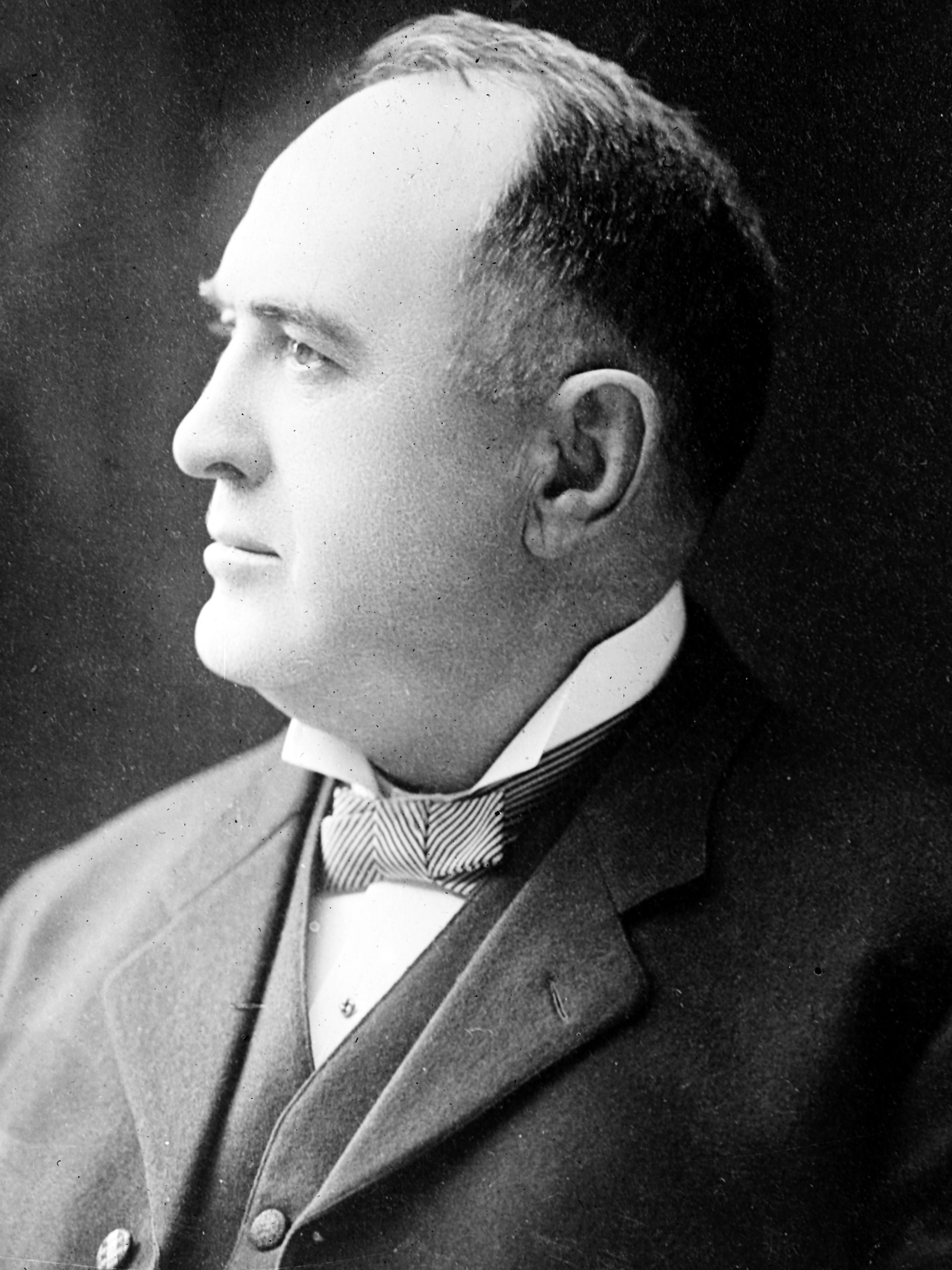

Member of the U.S. House of Representatives from Maine's 2nd district
- In office March 4, 1911 – March 3, 1917
- Preceded by: John P. Swasey
- Succeeded by: Wallace H. White

Mayor of Lewiston, Maine
- In office 1902–1903
- Preceded by: George W. Furbush
- Succeeded by: William B. Skelton
- In office 1890–1891
- Preceded by: Horace C. Little
- Succeeded by: William H. Newell
- In office 1887–1888
- Preceded by: Charles Walker
- Succeeded by: Horace C. Little

Personal details
- Born: August 27, 1859 Lewiston, Maine, U.S.
- Died: July 30, 1936 (aged 76) Lewiston, Maine, U.S.
- Resting place: Mount Hope Cemetery
- Party: Democratic
- Education: Bowdoin College
- Profession: Attorney

Daniel J. McGillicuddy (August 27, 1859 – July 30, 1936) was a United States representative from Maine.

== Biography ==
McGillicuddy was born in Lewiston on August 27, 1859, to John and Ellen McGillicuddy, both Irish immigrants. He attended the common schools and then Bates College in Lewiston from 1877 to 1880. He graduated from Bowdoin College in 1881. He studied law, was admitted to the bar in 1883 and commenced practice in Lewiston.

He was elected a member of the Maine House of Representatives, was elected Mayor of Lewiston, and was a delegate at large from Maine to the Democratic National Conventions in 1892, 1904, 1912, and 1920. He was an unsuccessful candidate for election in 1906 to the Sixtieth Congress and in 1908 to the Sixty-first Congress. He was elected as a Democrat to the Sixty-second, Sixty-third, and Sixty-fourth Congresses (March 4, 1911 – March 3, 1917).

He was an unsuccessful candidate for reelection in 1916 to the Sixty-fifth Congress and for election in 1918 to the Sixty-sixth Congress. He was a member of the Democratic National Committee from 1917 to 1932. He continued the practice of law in Lewiston until his death in that city on July 30, 1936. He was interred in Mount Hope Cemetery.

McGillicuddy was the last representative from Maine's second congressional district to lose re-election until Republican Bruce Poliquin lost re-election to Democrat Jared Golden in 2018.

== See also ==
- First McGillicuddy Block
- List of mayors of Lewiston, Maine

U.S. House of Representatives
| Preceded by John P. Swasey | Member of the U.S. House of Representatives from Maine's 2nd congressional district March 4, 1911 – March 3, 1917 | Succeeded by Wallace H. White |
