= Bart Fromuth =

American attorney and politician

Member of the New Hampshire House of Representatives from the 7th Hillsborough district
- In office December, 2015 – December 6, 2018

Personal details
- Party: Republican
- Education: Bates College; Northeastern University

Bart Fromuth is an American attorney and politician who has was a member of the New Hampshire House of Representatives for the 7th Hillsborough district in Bedford since 2015. He is a Republican and works in the Committee on Commerce and Consumer Affairs. Fromuth also is the chief operating officer (COO) of Freedom Energy Logistics, an electricity and gas company. He graduated from Bates College in Lewiston, Maine in 2003 and attended Northeastern University in Boston, earning his J.D. in 2008.

On November 6, 2018, Fromuth lost reelection with a final vote count of 4,781, placing him 7th in the election for the six seats in Hillsborough district 7.
