= Japonica Partners =

Multinational private equity firm

Japonica Partners & Co.
- Type: Private equity firm
- Industry: Asset Management
- Founded: 1988; 38 years ago Providence, Rhode Island, United States
- Founder: Paul B. Kazarian
- Headquarters: New York, New York, United States
- Area served: Worldwide
- Key people: Paul B. Kazarian (Chairman & CEO)
- Products: Specialized investment
- Owner: Paul B. Kazarian
- Website: www.japonica.com

Japonica Partners & Co. is an American multinational private equity firm headquartered in New York, New York, United States. The company specializes in underperforming global asset classes and undervalued investment positions. The firm's public investments includes the largest tender-hold for Greek Government Bonds in the world valued at €4 billion (approximately $4.2 billion in U.S. dollars). The firm also holds shares in and has reorganized multiple companies such as Allegheny International ($690 million), Sunbeam-Oster ($1.5 billion), CNW Corporation ($1.6 billion), and Borden ($2.4 billion).

The company is known for its control and leadership by Paul B. Kazarian, who is the company's managing director and chief executive officer.

== History ==
The firm was founded in 1988 in Providence, Rhode Island by former Goldman Sachs investment banker, Paul B. Kazarian. A year later the company began its first bid for a corporation, Chicago and North Western Transportation Company, a railroad holding company. The firm eventually won the bid, transformed the company's management structure and profit streams eventually selling it to Blackstone Group who took the company private. One fiscal year later, the firm moved in to bid for Allegheny International–a company that held Sunbeam-Oster. Kazarian was appointed the president of the CEO of Sunbeam, a position he held for three years. During his tenure, he brought the company to record breaking profit levels but eventually was ousted by the company's board for an overaggressive management style. After his was dismissed of his duties in the company he returned to Japonica as CEO and began bidding for Borden Co. At the time the company had $180 million in assets available for bidding. The firm offered $1.27 billion to buy out the company but was ultimately out-bet by Kohlberg Kravis Roberts.

== Corporate affairs ==
Japonica Partners is a private company thus is not currently being traded in equity markets and stock exchanges such as the New York Stock Exchange and NASDAQ.

== Charles & Agnes Kazarian Eternal Foundation ==
The Charles & Agnes Kazarian Eternal Foundation is a private operating foundation founded and controlled by the firm's CEO, Paul B. Kazarian. The foundation furthers the United Nations' Millennium Development Goals: eradicate extreme poverty and hunger, achieve universal primary education, promote gender equality and empower women, reduce child mortality, improve maternal health, combat HIV/AIDS, malaria, and other diseases, ensure environmental sustainability, develop a global partnership for development. The foundation operated under the 501(c)(3) tax code of the Internal Revenue Service.
