= John T. Abbott =

American diplomat and lawyer

United States Minister to Colombia
- In office June 22, 1889 – July 17, 1893

Personal details
- Born: John True Abbott; 1850 Keene, New Hampshire, U.S.
- Died: March 8, 1914 (aged 63–64) Keene, New Hampshire, U.S.
- Spouse: Alice E. Merriman (m. 1874)
- Education: Bates College
- Occupation: Diplomat, lawyer

John True Abbott (1850 – March 8, 1914) was an American diplomat and lawyer who served as the United States Ambassador to Colombia from 1889 to 1893.

== Biography ==
Born in Keene, New Hampshire, he was the son of Rev. Stephen G. and Sarah Burbank (Cheney) Abbott, and he married Alice E. Merriman in 1874. Abbott was educated at Bates College, and read law.

As an attorney, he served as city solicitor and counsel to the Santo Domingo Development Company. He was nominated as Minister to Colombia in 1889, and served to 1893. He is interred at the Woodland Cemetery in Keene, N.H.

== See also ==
- List of Bates College people

Diplomatic posts
Preceded by Dabney H. Maury	United States Minister to Colombia; June 22, 1889 – July 17, 1893	Succeeded by L. F. McKinney
