= Vulture capitalist =

Type of investor

Vulture capitalists are investors that acquire distressed firms in the hopes of making them more profitable so as to ultimately sell them for a profit. Due to their aggressive investing nature, and the methods they use to make firms more profitable, vulture capitalists are often criticized.

== Distinguishing between venture and vulture capitalists ==
A venture capitalist is an investor who provides funding for start-ups, early stage firms and companies with growth potential. These types of firms seek out venture capitalists, as they are too small or too new to have credit profiles, making them ineligible for bank loans and other forms of raising capital.

Although risky, venture capitalists invest in firms as there are lucrative returns on their investments when the companies they are investing in are successful. Furthermore, venture capitalists will often invest in a range of firms rather than just one or two, in order to mitigate risks if the investments are unsuccessful.

On the other hand, vulture capitalists provide a final attempt at gaining funding. Whereas venture capitalists seek firms with growth potential, vulture capitalists usually seek out firms where costs can be cut in order to increase profits. Mostly, these firms are distressed and on the brink of bankruptcy. Due to this reason, vulture capitalists are able to buy these firms at a much lower price than if they had been profitable and expanding.

Once a firm is acquired, vulture capitalists can attempt to increase efficiency in order to turn around the company. This is often done by cutting costs wherever possible, which in part is likely to be accomplished by firing workers where possible, reducing benefits, or both, which increases short-term profits or the perceived likelihood of future profitability, thus raising the share price and the worth of the investor's holdings. Lastly, the vulture capitalists sell any equity they own, making a profit. But vulture capitalists can also choose to divide and sell off the entire company in pieces, if this should increase the attractiveness of each individual piece to its purchaser and thus allow the vulture capitalist a net profit.

== Criticism ==
Vulture capitalists are subject to heightened scrutiny as they target firms that are generally financially vulnerable due to failures in securing capital. These firms are then acquired by vulture capitalists for prices that are often considerably lower than perceived fair market valuation. The lack of bidders and the state of duress accompanied by a last-chance buyout generally favor the vulture capitalist.

Once vulture capitalists acquire a firm, cost-cutting measures usually consist of mass layoffs (alongside other operational streamlining measures), the goal being to increase or outright generate profitability for their own gain. Vulture capitalists, amongst other reasons, are criticized for this, especially as the newly unemployed people can be said to put pressure on the political economy and general society through their need of unemployment benefits, which comes from company payroll taxes and other taxpayers.

For the same reasons, venture capitalists can be accused of being vulture capitalists, or "vulture" for short, depending on how they conduct their business. In this sense, vulture capitalist is used as a derogatory word for venture capitalists, as the vulture capitalists are considered to be preying on firms in distress for their own profit.

== See also ==
- Asset stripping
- Leveraged buyout
- Private equity
- Vulture fund
- Hedge fund
