= Louis R. Sullivan =

American anthropologist (1892–1925)

Louis Robert Sullivan (1892–1925) was an American anthropologist.

He was born in Houlton, Maine, on May 21, 1892. He studied at Bates College and Brown University. In 1916 he joined the staff of the American Museum of Natural History. From 1920 to 1925 Sullivan also held a joint appointment with the Bishop Museum in Honolulu, Hawai`i in order to study Native Hawaiians. Sullivan's contributions to physical anthropology include a large number of papers upon a variety of subjects, but especially upon Polynesian anthropometry.

== Works ==
- Racial Types in the Philippine Islands (1918)
- Anthropometry of the Siouan Tribes (1920)
- A Contribution to Samoan Somatology (1921)
- Essentials of Anthropometry (1928)
