= Robert E. McAfee =

American physician

Robert E. McAfee is a general and vascular surgeon, physician and advocate for the prevention of family violence and better healthcare, particularly for adolescents. He was the 149th President of the American Medical Association (AMA) in 1994–95. McAfee used his influence to educate the medical community on family violence issues and became a nationally known spokesman for these and other health initiatives.

He died at his home on December 16, 2023, and is interred at Evergreen Cemetery in Portland, Maine.

== Early life and education ==
McAfee was born August 25, 1935, in Portland, Maine and attended Deering High School. He received his B.S from Bates College and an MD.from Tufts University School of Medicine. He completed his internship and surgical residency at the Maine Medical Center.

== Career ==
McAfee was the attending surgeon at the Maine Medical Center for 31 years, as well as Chief of Surgery and Vascular Surgery at Mercy Hospital in Portland, Maine. McAfee was appointed to the American Bar Association's Commission on Domestic Violence and served on the Advisory Committee to the Attorney General and the Secretary of the Department of Health and Human Services in the Clinton administration. He served as Vice chair of the AMA's Board of Trustees, as a member of the executive committee of the Board and as an AMA Commissioner to the Joint Commission on Accreditation of Healthcare Organizations. In 2002 he was appointed chairman of the Board of the newly created Dirigo Health Plan, designed to assist in provision of health care coverage to Maine citizens. McAfee was appointed to some position by every Maine governor from 1968 to 2011. McAfee was the 2012 recipient of the Hanley Award for Health Leadership.
