= List of people from Bluefield, West Virginia =

This is a list of people who were born in, lived in, or are closely associated with the city of Bluefield, West Virginia.

== Athletics ==
- Roy Hawley, former athletic director for Marshall University and West Virginia University, namesake for Hawley Field
- Christy Martin, professional boxer, International Boxing Hall of Fame member
- Cal Ripken Jr., former baseball shortstop and third baseman who played with the Bluefield Orioles
- Toni Stone, first of three women to play professional baseball full-time
- Buzzy Wilkinson, former Boston Celtics guard, West Virginia Sports Hall of Fame

== Arts and entertainment ==
- Denise Giardina, award-winning novelist, former candidate for governor of West Virginia
- Argyle Goolsby, musician, best known for being the lead vocalist, bassist, and co-founder of Bluefield-based horror punk band Blitzkid
- John S. Knight, newspaper publisher
- Alex B. Mahood, architect
- Eva Pilgrim, South Korean-born American broadcast journalist
- Maceo Pinkard, composer, lyricist, and music publisher known for Sweet Georgia Brown
- Brian Platnick, contract bridge champion
- Hugh Ike Shott, Newspaper editor, broadcaster, and politician
- Anna Stuart, soap opera actress

== Education, politics and service ==
- James E. Brown III, former aerospace executive, test pilot instructor, United States Air Force officer
- Othello Maria Harris-Jefferson, educator, activist
- Hamilton Hatter, professor at Storer College, president of Bluefield State College
- Elizabeth Kee, First woman elected to the U.S. House of Representatives from West Virginia
- Stephen Murphy, retired federal agent
- John Forbes Nash, Jr., Nobel Prize-winning mathematician
- Zirl A. Palmer, businessman and civil rights activist
- Robert Page Sims, an early African American academic, civil rights leader, scientist, and college president
- Stella James Sims, an African-American science professor who held positions at Storer College, Virginia University of Lynchburg, and Bluefield Colored Institute
- Junior J. Spurrier, U.S. Army soldier, recipient of the Medal of Honor and the Distinguished Service Cross for actions in World War II
- Charles Kenzie Steele, civil rights activist
