= Lockwood House (Harpers Ferry) =

- U.S. National Register of Historic Places
- U.S. Historic district – Contributing property
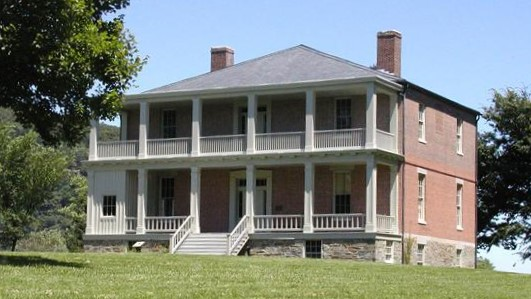
- Lockwood House in 2015

- Location within West Virginia Location within the United States
- Location: Fillmore Street; Harpers Ferry, West Virginia
- Coordinates: 39°19′25.4″N 77°44′07.5″W
- Built: 1847–1848
- Architectural style: Greek Revival; Italianate
- Part of: Harpers Ferry National Historical Park (ID66000047)
- NRHP reference No.: 66000047
- Designated CP: October 15, 1966

Lockwood House is a historic building in Harpers Ferry National Historical Park in Harpers Ferry in the U.S. state of West Virginia. Located on Camp Hill on Fillmore Street, the house is built of brick and stone in the Greek Revival and Italianate architectural styles. Lockwood House was built by the United States Department of War between 1847 and 1848 as the residence of the paymaster for the United States Armory and Arsenal at Harpers Ferry. For three months in 1864, the house served as Union General Henry Lockwood's headquarters during the Civil War, which earned it its name. It was significantly renovated in 1858, shortly before the Civil War, and again in 1883, while a part of Storer College. During the Civil War it was first used in 1862 as a military hospital, called Clayton Hospital, and then by Army officers of both sides. In 1865, it became the first building of Storer College, which eventually added a third floor (later removed in restoration work by the National Park Service).

== The paymaster's quarters ==
The Lockwood House was first constructed in 1848. Maj. Henry K. Craig, served at the Armory Superintendent from 1841 to 1844. Craig suggested significant improvements to both the musket and rifle factories, as well as repairs to the armory canal, and the “erection of Quarters for the Commanding Officer and Paymaster". Maj. John Symington, appointed to replace Maj. Craig at the post of Superintendent of the Armory in 1844, repeated the request for improvements and provided “plans & estimates in detail for new structures and alterations and repairs to old buildings at this Armory."

== Civil War period ==
The Armory was destroyed early in the Civil War. With the outbreak of Civil War in 1861 and the destruction of the armory installation, Harpers Ferry, its people, industry, and their associated buildings, began many years of struggle to establish a new identity. Symbolic of this transition, both in politics and industry, the former armory Paymaster's Quarters was used during the Civil War as Headquarters for Union Generals, including General Sheridan and General Henry H. Lockwood whose name remained permanently associated with the house, and to house prisoners of war, wounded soldiers, and medical supplies. Additionally, the loss of the armory at the beginning of the war eventually led to development of new industry, not the least of which was tourism associated both with the scenery and the association of the town with John Brown and the Civil War.

"In future years traveler and tourist will eagerly resort [here]...and history will point out [this] as the spot where many acts in the great tragedy, not yet closed, took place." ~ John D. Smith, 19th Main Infantry, September 1862

In August 1864, the house was also used as a headquarters by Union General Philip Sheridan as he prepared for his Valley campaign.

== Storer College ==
=== Rev. Brackett's school ===
With the end of the Civil War and the Passage of the 13th Amendment, there was a national effort to educate former enslaved persons. The federal government established the Freedmen's Bureau, an agency dedicated to the assistance of integrating former slaves into society. Freedmen's Bureau activities included relocating, housing, feeding, and clothing the destitute and homeless. In addition, education became an essential element of the bureau's mission. The Lockwood House in Harpers Ferry was the first building to house the newly established Storer School. Reverend Nathan Cook Brackett a member of New England's Freewill Baptist Home Mission Society, established a primary school in the war-torn building. He taught basic fundamentals including reading, writing, and arithmetic to the children of former slaves and their parents.

Nathan C. Brackett, a Freewill Baptist minister from Philips Maine, was educated at the Maine State Seminary (today Bates College) and Dartmouth College. The American Missionary Association, a group working with the Freedmen's Bureau, assigned the Shenandoah Valley to the Freewill Baptists. Nathan Brackett was familiar with the territory having served in the Shenandoah Valley, even headquartered in Harpers Ferry, in 1864 with the U.S. Christian Commission:

The agent upon whom the largest share of the work, in detail, was devolved, was Rev. N.C. Brackett, of Maine. Being a strong man, and possessed of tireless energy, it was impossible to give him too much to do. He was associated with me in all the operations in the Shenandoah Valley, and won for himself the kindest wishes of many hundreds of soldiers, as well as of officers and delegates.

Upon arriving at Harpers Ferry, Brackett found a desperate and tumultuous situation. He later commented that,

I found a colored population poor and helpless, surrounded by white people desperately hostile to their improvement. The task of securing school rooms and boarding places for the teachers was by no means a light one. The very few who would have been willing to furnish us were frequently prevented by the fear of their neighbors. Through the kindness of Capt. Young, we were allowed to occupy an old government house, which answered for school room and a place to live in, at Harper’s Ferry.

Dedicated as they were, these few teachers could not begin to meet the educational needs of the freedmen in the area. Across the South, education of freedmen was an urgent priority within their community. By 1867, some 16 teachers struggled to educate 2,500 students in the Shenandoah Valley of Virginia. Reverend Brackett realized that he needed to train African-American teachers.

The Lockwood House would serve as the main building for Storer School until 1867, when the school came to the attention of John Storer, a philanthropist from Maine. Storer offered a $10,000 grant to Reverend Brackett's school if several conditions could be met. First, the school must become a degree-granting college. Second, the school had to be open to all applicants, regardless of race or gender. And, finally, the Freewill Baptists had to match his $10,000 donation within the year. After a year-long effort, the money was raised, and Storer College opened its doors. By March 1868 it received its state charter. Through fundraisers and state funding, Storer College expanded its buildings but retained control of Lockwood House for the purpose of dormitories.

== Historic preservation ==
In 1962, Harpers Ferry National Historical Park was established by Congress, an upgrade from its National Monument status of 1944. A study of the Lockwood House was begun in 1959 by historian Philip R. Smith, Jr., was completed by historian William T. Ingersoll and architect Archie W. Franzen. Historic American Buildings Survey (HABS) floor plans and photographs recorded Lockwood House as it appeared in 1958. The Lockwood House would undergo extensive exterior restoration between 1965 and 1969. The third story was removed and the hipped roof was restored back to its 1858 appearance. The east portico and west double gallery porches were reconstructed and the exterior brick walls were sand blasted.

In the early 1970s two of the first floor rooms were refurnished to depict the first years of Brackett school based on historical reports by Anne Coxe Toogood and David H. Wallace. In the 30 years since, the building has remained relatively vacant with the basement in use currently to house part of the Harpers Ferry National Historical Park curatorial collection.

In 2021, the NPS Historic Preservation Training Center finished a project focused on conserving historic plaster. Early in 2022, they continued with more preservation efforts, which included reinstalling historic millwork, repairing floors, and adding protective surfaces that reveal features emphasizing the building's interesting construction history.
