= Celeste Brackett Newcomer =

American educator

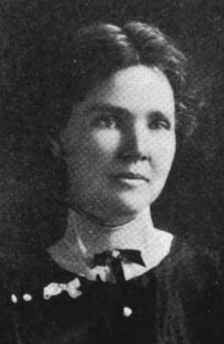
- Celeste Brackett Newcomer, from a 1922 publication
- Born: Celeste Elizabeth Brackett; June 12, 1871; Harper's Ferry, West Virginia
- Died: February 19, 1951 (aged 79); Hillsboro, Virginia
- Occupation: Educator
- Parent: Nathan Cook Brackett

Celeste Brackett Newcomer (June 12, 1871 – February 19, 1951) was an American educator, bank director, and clubwoman based in Harpers Ferry, West Virginia.

== Early life ==
Celeste Elizabeth Brackett was born in Harpers Ferry, West Virginia, the daughter of Nathan Cook Brackett (1836–1910) and Nancy Louise Wood (1842–1936). Her parents moved from Maine to West Virginia under the care of the New England Freewill Baptist Home Mission Society after the American Civil War, to set up freedmen schools and other services, and in 1867 Rev. Nathan Cook Brackett became first president of Storer College, a teacher training and vocational school serving Black students. She graduated from Hillandale College in Michigan, where she also met her husband, a fellow Hillsdale graduate.

== Career ==
After college, Newcomer taught domestic science, covering cookery and home nursing, to women students at Storer College. She worked alongside her parents, her husband, two aunts, and her sister Mary Brackett Robertson. She was also president of the local chapter of the Women's Christian Temperance Union, co-founded the Bolivar Woman's Club, and served on the board of directors for the Bank of Harpers Ferry.

== Personal life ==
Celeste Brackett married minister and fellow teacher John Curtin Newcomer in 1894. They had four children, Mary Louise (1896–1999), Daniel (1899–1918), Lionel (1903–1988), and John Nathan (1914–1992). Her son Daniel died from measles and pneumonia, while training at an army aviation camp in Texas during World War I. She was widowed in 1937, and after several years of illness, she died in 1951, at a rest home in Hillsboro, Virginia, aged 79 years. The campus house she owned from 1929 to 1944 is now known as the Bird-Brady House, now on the grounds of the Harpers Ferry National Park.
