= Meyerstown, West Virginia =

- Unincorporated community
- Location within West Virginia Location within the United States
- Coordinates: 39°12′21″N 77°51′48″W
- Country: United States
- State: West Virginia
- County: Jefferson
- Time zone: UTC-5 (Eastern (EST))
  - Summer (DST): UTC-4 (EDT)
- GNIS feature ID: 1549819

Meyerstown is an unincorporated community near the Shenandoah River in Jefferson County, West Virginia, United States.

== Notable person ==
- Robert Page Sims, African American academic and university president
