= Stella James Sims =

African-American science professor (1875-1963)

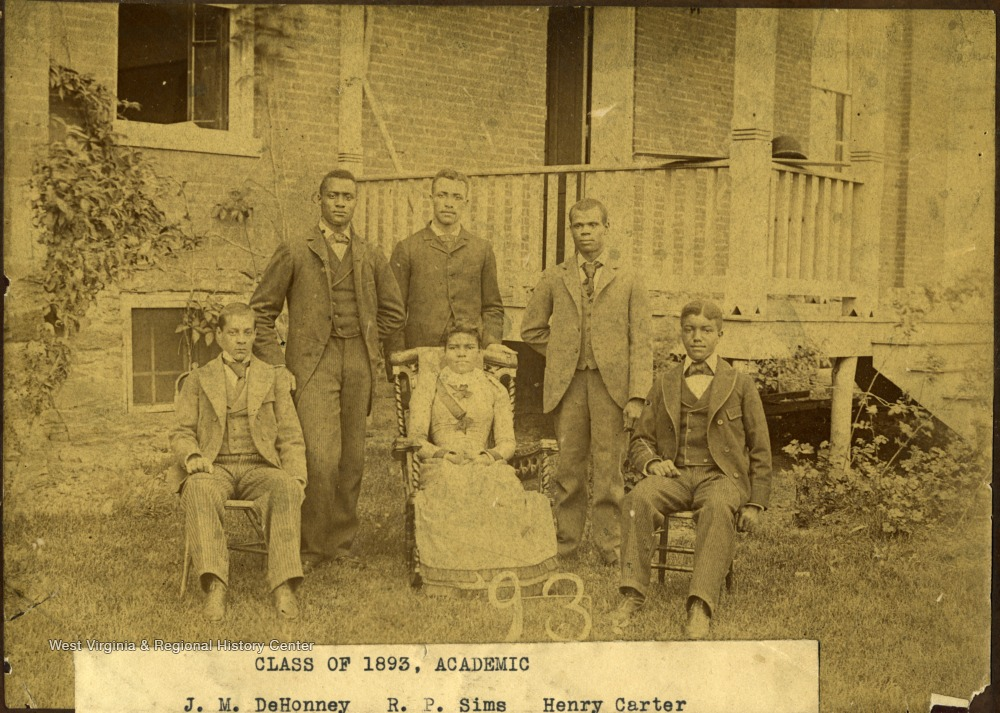
Class of 1893 at Storer College, featuring M. DeHonney, Robert P. Sims, Henry Carter, W. P. Crump, Stella James Sims, J. C. Gilmer

Stella James Sims (1875-1963) was an African-American science professor who held positions at Storer College, Virginia University of Lynchburg, and Bluefield Colored Institute.

Stella James was born February 5, 1875, in Washington, D. C. to Lewis and Annie (Smith) James. After attending the Washington D.C. public schools, James attended and graduated from Storer College in 1893 and Bates College in Maine in 1897 (the first African-American woman to graduate from that school). While in college she wrote for the Bates Student and majored in physics. She then taught at the Virginia Seminary in Lynchburg, Virginia, from 1897 to 1898, and then Storer College from 1898 to 1901. In 1901 she married Robert Page Sims (1872-1944), a fellow Storer alumnus, and they had six children together. From 1906 until at least the 1930s, Sims taught science and biology at Bluefield Colored Institute in Bluefield, West Virginia, where she served as department chair. Sims eventually retired to a farm in Perkiomenville, Pennsylvania. She died in 1963 and her grave is at the Cedar Hill Cemetery in Bolivar, West Virginia.
