= Jared Maurice Arter =

American educator, missionary (1850–1930)

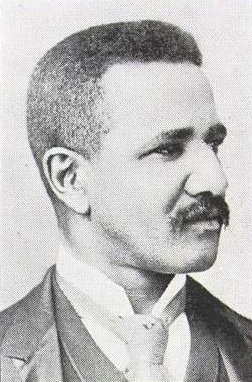
Jared Maurice Arter

Jared Maurice Arter (January 27, 1850 – June 7, 1925) was an American former slave who became a writer, Christian missionary, and academic.

== Early life ==
Jared Maurice Arter was born into slavery in Jefferson County, Virginia (now in West Virginia). His father, Jeremiah Arter, was not very present in Arter's life because of his slave status and his work in the mills in Jefferson County. When Arter was about seven, his father died after falling down some stairs and being paralyzed at a mill. His mother was Hannah Frances Stephenson Arter, who was a slave that was thirty-eight years younger than his father.

Arter lived near Harpers Ferry during the early part of his life, and when he was nine, he witnessed the hanging of four of the abolitionist John Brown's men: Cook, Coppie, Green, and Stephens. A couple years after this, in the midst of the American Civil War, Arter saw both Union and Confederate troops march past where he lived.

Under the Emancipation Proclamation of 1863, Arter's family was freed from slavery. Shortly after being freed, Arter's mother took most of the family, including Arter, to Washington, D.C. There a family was found for Arter by the name of Wealch where he stayed for short while.

== Education ==
In 1865, Arter's mother got a proposition from a businessman from New York to educate her two older boys, on the condition that they would be bound to him until they were twenty-one. Arter jumped at the opportunity to get a good education, and spent the next several years working for the Ayer family and beginning his education.

Even after leaving the Ayer residence, Arter continued his education for many years while working along the way. He attended Newfield and Ithaca, a private school in New York, Washington, D.C., Storer College, Harper's Ferry. He received a PhD at Pennsylvania State College, and a BD at Hillsdale College and Chicago Theological Seminary.

== Career ==
In 1873, Arter came to accept Christianity as his sole faith, and became a soldier of the cross. In 1887, he was ordained to the gospel ministry, and was given work at Curtis Free Baptist Church. From 1895 to 1898, Arter was an instructor at the Virginia Theological Seminary and College in Lynchburg, Virginia. He also taught at Storer College and was the superintendent of a school in Hilltop in Fayette County, West Virginia.

After getting an education himself, Arter devoted his life to educating others. He did not finish his own schooling until the spring of 1894. Though he loved teaching others about the Bible he also loved history, biology, and literature of modern missions and Negro advancement. After being questioned on his views of human progress, he said: "Urge above all things else regenerated lives and loyalty to God, patriotism, true home building, economy, education, race consciousness and unceasing efforts to deserve and to secure all rights."

Arter was the author of the slave narrative, Echoes From a Pioneer Life (1922).

In 1921, Arter was serving as pastor of Curtis Free Will Baptist Church in Harpers Ferry.

== Personal life ==
Arter married twice: once on July 10, 1890, to Emily Carter, and again on December 29, 1910, to Maggie Wall. In his first marriage he had five children, four of whom died before they were age twenty. He was a Republican, missionary baptist, and mason.

Arter died on June 7, 1925.

== Publications ==
- Arter, Jared Maurice (1922). Echoes from a Pioneer Life. Atlanta, Georgia: A. B. Caldwell Publishing Co.
