= Robert Page Sims =

American scientist (1872–1944)

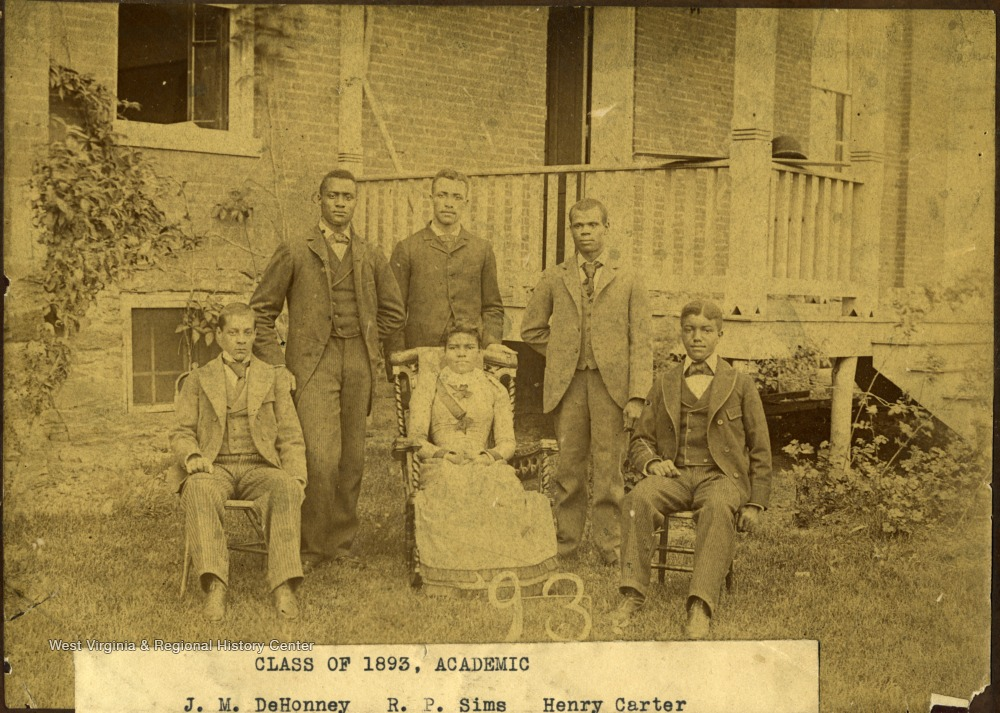
Storer College photo from 1893 featuring M. DeHonney, Robert P. Sims, Henry Carter, W. P. Crump, Stella James Sims, J. C. Gilmer

Robert Page Sims (1872–1944) was an early African American academic, civil rights leader, scientist, and college president who held positions at Virginia University of Lynchburg and Bluefield State College.

Sims was born in Meyerstown, West Virginia, to Charles and Lucy (Page) Sims and grew up working on a farm. Sims graduated from Storer College, a Freewill Baptist school, in Harpers Ferry, West Virginia, in 1893 and then Hillsdale College, a Free Will Baptist school in Michigan, in 1897. He also did post-graduate work at the University of Pennsylvania. In 1901 Sims married Professor Stella James Sims, a graduate of Bates College, whom he knew from Storer, and they had six children together.

Sims taught first at the Virginia Seminary (Virginia University of Lynchburg) as a science professor. Next he taught at the Douglass School in Huntington, West Virginia. He then served five years as assistant principal of Bluefield State College under President Hamilton Hatter before becoming president himself in 1906. While serving as president he maintained a correspondence and professional relationship with W. E. B. Du Bois regarding civil rights issues for African Americans and attended the Pan-African Congress in Europe in 1921. Sims stepped down as president of Bluefield in 1936 but continued to stay involved with the school. He died in 1944. He was buried at the Cedar Hill Cemetery in Bolivar, West Virginia, near Harpers Ferry.
