= John Francis Wheaton =

American politician and lawyer

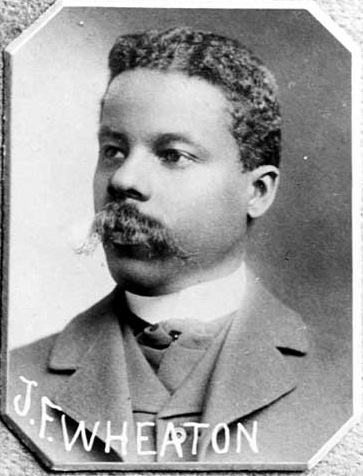
- Wheaton, c. 1899

Member of the Minnesota House of Representatives from the 42nd district
- In office 1899–1900

Personal details
- Born: May 8, 1866 Hagerstown, Maryland
- Died: January 15, 1922 (aged 55) New York City
- Party: Republican (later Democrat)
- Spouse: Ella Chambers
- Children: Layton J., Frank P.
- Education: Howard University; University of Minnesota Law School
- Profession: Lawyer

John Francis Wheaton (May 8, 1866 – January 15, 1922), name alternately written as John Frank Wheaton and J. Frank Wheaton, was an American politician. He was the first African American elected to the Minnesota Legislature, serving in its House of Representatives. Wheaton was known as a vibrant figure and gifted orator who quickly rose to prominence in Minnesota politics only to quickly leave not long afterward.

== Biography ==
=== Early years ===
Wheaton was born in Hagerstown, Maryland, in 1866. His father, Jacob, was the first African American to vote in the state of Maryland after passage of the Fifteenth Amendment; a park in Hagerstown is named after him. Due to race relations in the area, Wheaton was required to go to the "colored" public elementary school. In order to complete the equivalent of high school, he attended Storer College, a historically black college in Harpers Ferry, West Virginia, graduating in 1882.

To pay his bills, he worked as a shoeshiner, sold newspapers, and did chores for professors. Meanwhile, he became an active member of the Republican party, attending the state Republican conventions of 1887, 1889 and 1891. During the 1888 presidential election, he was an active speaker on behalf of the eventually successful Republican candidate Benjamin Harrison at ward meetings. At age 22, Wheaton attended the 1888 Republican National Convention in Chicago as an alternate delegate from Maryland; he was the alternate for George L. Wellington.

Wheaton married Ella Chambers on June 6, 1889, and had two children, Layton J. and Frank P. He apprenticed law with a Hagerstown attorney before moving to Washington, D.C., where he attended Howard University. During that time, his connection to U.S. Congressman Louis E. McComas helped him get work as a clerk in the United States Congress. He worked as a clerk for a few years, but the 1892 presidential election, resulting in the election of Democrat Grover Cleveland, caused him to be terminated from his clerk position. At that time he decided to seriously pursue law. He passed the Maryland bar exam in 1892, but moved to Minnesota soon thereafter; the reasons for his move are unclear.

=== Life in Minnesota ===
Arriving in Minnesota in 1893, he attended the University of Minnesota Law School, becoming its first African American graduate, in 1894, and was elected class orator. He worked as a clerk in the state legislature and later as a deputy clerk for the Minneapolis municipal court system. He later opened a private law practice and became a major part of the local African American community, spearheading efforts to pass civil rights legislation. He also lobbied for permitting African American soldiers to volunteer for service in the Spanish–American War. At the time of his election to the legislature, he had already successfully defended a murder suspect.

On November 8, 1898, Wheaton was elected to the Minnesota House of Representatives representing District 42. Newspapers of the time called the district "the most aristocratic portion of Minneapolis" in the state house; it included a large chunk of the metropolitan area from the Kenwood neighborhood to modern Eden Prairie, Edina and Excelsior. He had won the Republican nomination by a large margin, and would go on to win the general election by a significant margin as well in an area where only approximately 100 of the area's over 40,000 residents were African Americans. While in office, he introduced and helped pass an 1899 civil rights statute that broadened existing Minnesota law and granted equal access for all races to saloons, which previously had been able to exclude customers based on race.

Wheaton twice represented Minnesota at the Republican National Convention. At the 1896 Republican National Convention, he was the alternate delegate to state senator Charles Alfred Pillsbury, and lobbied on behalf of eventual nominee William McKinley to African American delegates from the South. At the 1900 Republican state convention, he gave an impassioned speech where, as described by the Minneapolis Journal, he "hypnotize[d] the convention with oratory" in arguing for a spot in Minnesota's national convention delegation for an African American. The Journal would report that "Before the delegates had time to pull up the lower jaws they dropped in amazement when they heard him nominate himself [. . .] Before the convention scarce knew what happened, Mr. Wheaton had won the prize." He was selected as the alternate to Knute Nelson.

=== Later years ===
"I am not going to forswear my allegiance to Minneapolis, which I love better than any place on earth, and I will get back here every time I get a change. I got my start here and I owe a great deal to the people of this city, where everyone is accorded 'equal rights' without regard to race, color or previous condition of servitude."
— John Francis Wheaton comments on his departure from Minnesota to the Minneapolis Times

Wheaton's attendance as a part of the Minnesota delegation at the 1900 Republican National Convention would be his last major work for the state of Minnesota. Before the state convention that preceded it, he had left for Chicago to be a co-founder of a life insurance company in that city. He later moved to New York City and by 1905 had set up his own law office in Manhattan with James Curtis, another African American attorney who had worked in Minnesota. The law firm was successful. Around the same time, Wheaton switched political parties and became a Democrat. Not long after his arrival, he was asked by Minnesota Governor John Albert Johnson to defend a former stenographer being tried for murder; Johnson and Wheaton knew each other from their time in the Minnesota Legislature.

Wheaton rose in the African American community in Harlem. He was a prominent member of the city's Black Caucus as well as the Black Elks Club, becoming the organization's national president in 1912. He served as an adviser to heavyweight boxing champion Jack Johnson, worked as a community organizer with Vaudeville entertainer Bert Williams, and served as counsel for Marcus Garvey's first wife in a publicized and contentious divorce. He unsuccessfully ran for a seat in the New York State Assembly in 1919; however he was subsequently given a position in the city district attorney's office, serving from January to May 1920.

Wheaton's life came to an abrupt end in early 1922. The previous fall he had stood bail for Luther Boddy, an accused murderer of two police detectives, taking on a $10,000 surety bond. The client (Boddy) disappeared, leaving Wheaton facing financial ruin. On January 15, 1922, after searching the city for the escaped accused murderer with the help of friends and colleagues, a despondent Wheaton committed suicide by inhaling gas at his home at 208 West 137th Street; his body was found by his son.

The funeral procession attracted 20,000 people to the streets to pay respects to Wheaton; and he was buried in Woodland Cemetery in The Bronx.

== Legacy ==
A contemporary political biography described Wheaton as one of "The Progressive Men of Minnesota." His political rise ran counter to prevailing national trends. The collapse of Reconstruction and rise in Jim Crow laws caused serious regression in African American political power. Minnesota would not have another African American state legislator until 1973. The news of his death was reported in several Twin Cities newspapers; the Minneapolis Journal saluted "the spectacular career of J. Frank Wheaton, Negro lawyer."
