= Hamilton Hatter =

African American professor and inventor (1856–1942)

- Born: April 24, 1856
- Died: September 21, 1942 (aged 86)

Hamilton Hatter (1856–1942) was an African-American professor at Storer College and the first president of Bluefield State College (originally Bluefield Colored Institute) in Bluefield, West Virginia from 1895 to 1906.

== Life and career ==
Hatter was born into slavery in 1856 in Charles Town, West Virginia. In order to pay for his education, he worked as a builder, mechanic, and a sawmill manager. Hatter graduated from Storer College in 1878.

He then moved to Maine to attend two Free Will Baptist schools connected to Storer. He first attended Nichols Latin School and graduated from Bates College in Lewiston, Maine, in 1888. After graduation from Bates, Hatter then returned to Storer College, where he taught Greek, Latin, and mathematics until 1896, and served on the Board of Trustees until 1906. Hatter was active in Republican politics and in 1892 he ran unsuccessfully for a seat in the West Virginia House of Delegates after receiving the Republican nomination. In 1893 Hatter received a patent for a device that improved corn harvesting. In 1895, Bluefield Colored Institute (later known as Bluefield State College) in West Virginia was founded with land-grant funds, and Governor Virgil A. Lewis chose Hamilton Hatter as the first principal of the school. Hatter served as principal until 1906, when Robert Page Sims replaced him. During World War I, Hatter spoke publicly on behalf of President Wilson's policies. Hamilton Hatter died in 1942 and was buried in Oak Grove Cemetery in Bluefield, West Virginia. In 1974 Bluefield named the College president's home "Hamilton Hatter Hall".
