= John Storer =

American merchant (1796–1867)

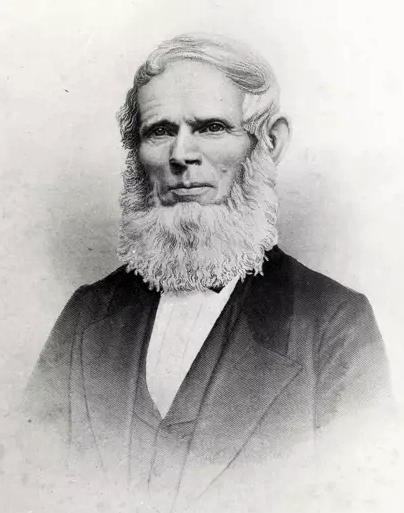
John Storer

John Storer (January 18, 1796 – October 23, 1867) was a merchant and philanthropist from Sanford, Maine, who was the namesake of Storer College in Harpers Ferry, West Virginia.

== Life and career ==
Storer was born in 1796 in Wells, Massachusetts (after 1820 in Maine) and was a Congregationalist. He started working as a clerk for the firm of Smith & Porter in Kennebunk, Maine, but on their recommendation, and with their financing, he set up his own shop in Sanford in 1820. He eventually owned stores throughout the state of Maine and made numerous lucrative investments.

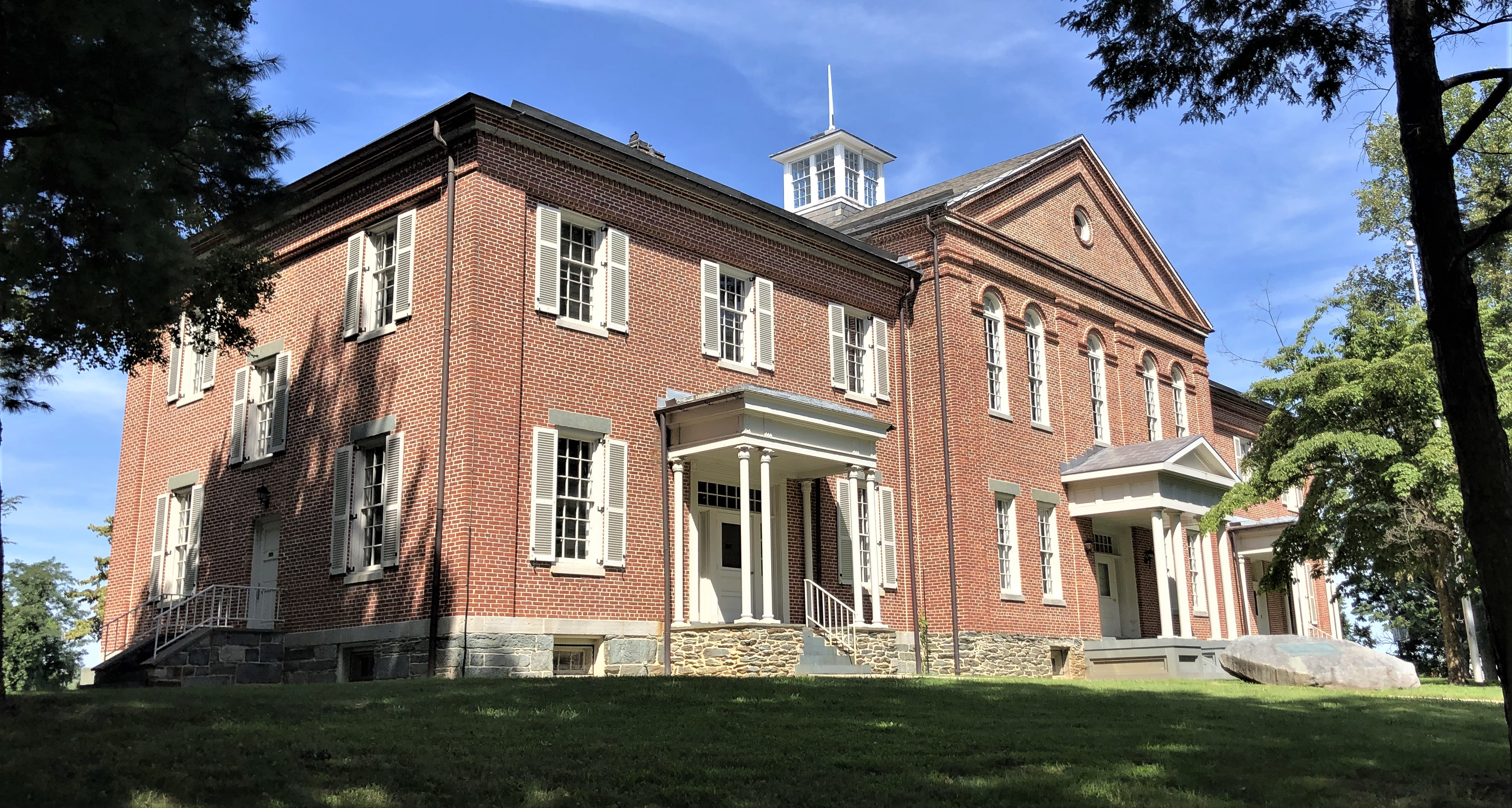
Storer College, founded with John Storer's donation

Storer was "an avowed Whig", later a Republican. No one in Sanford was more in favor of the Union cause. As told by the wife of Rev. Oren B. Cheney, founder of Bates College, a Freewill Baptist school in Maine, Cheney suggested to Storer that his desire to donate to "the colored race" could finance a Free Baptist school for former slaves. Storer offered a $10,000 matching grant to the Freewill Baptists for a "colored school" in the South, with several conditions. First, the school must plan to become a degree-granting college. Second, the school had to be open to all applicants, regardless of "race" or gender. And, finally, the Freewill Baptist Church had to match his donation within the year. The money was raised, just days before Storer's offer would expire, and Storer College opened its doors; in March 1868 it received its state charter.

Storer died in 1867, of typhoid fever; Free Will Baptist ministers conducted the funeral. His heirs donated additional funds to the school.
