= Nathan Cook Brackett =

Abolitionist, Free Will Baptist pastor

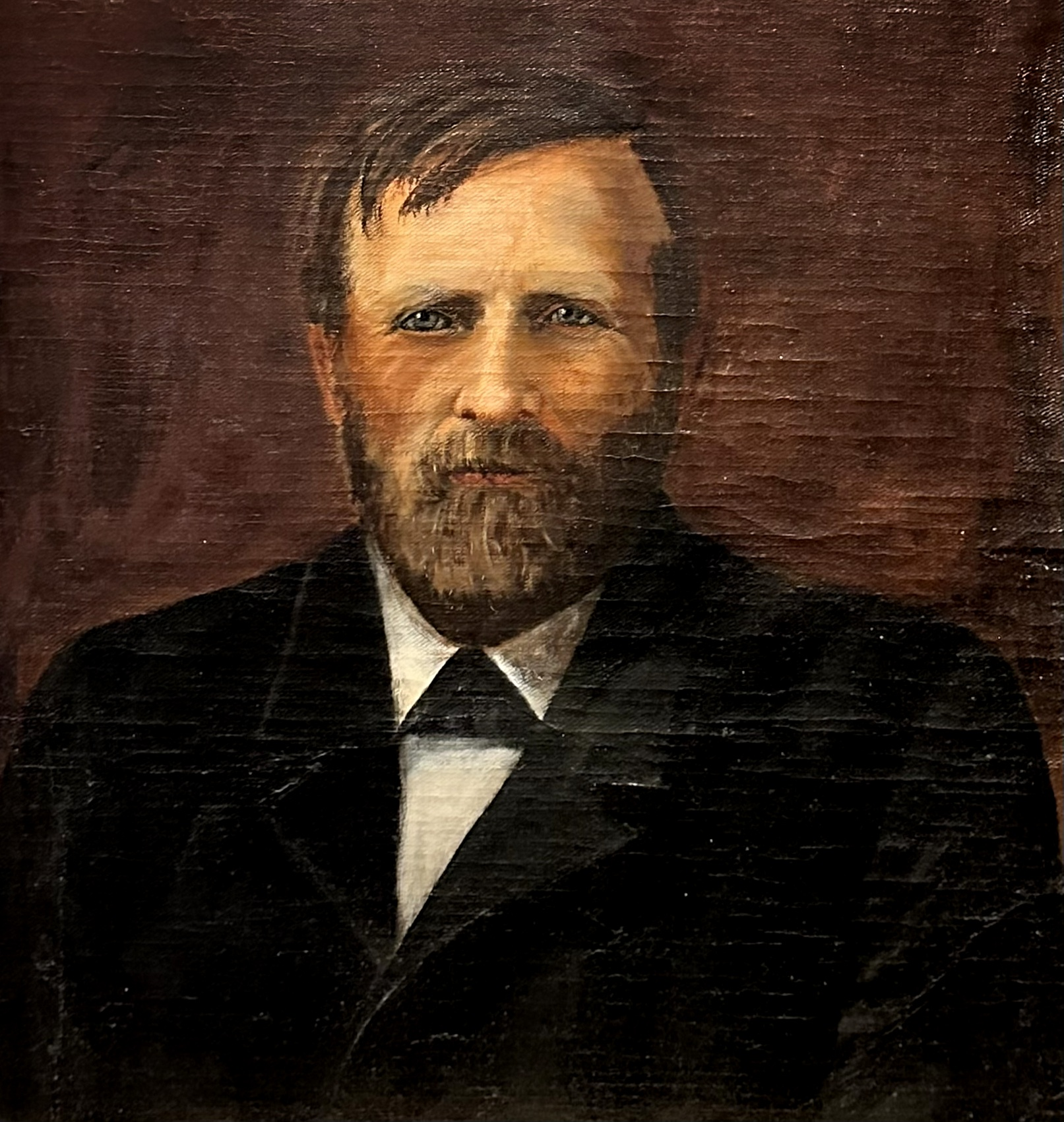
Nathan Cook Brackett, abolitionist, founder of Storer College, and Bluefield State College in West Virginia

Nathan Cook Brackett (1836–1910) was an abolitionist, Free Will Baptist pastor, first president of Storer College, and chairman and co-founder of Bluefield State College.

Nathan Brackett was born in Phillips, Maine in 1836 and starting in 1857 attended Bates College (then called the Maine State Seminary) and then Colby College (then called Waterville College) and finally Dartmouth College for his senior year. After graduating from Dartmouth in 1864 and becoming ordained as a Free Will Baptist pastor, Brackett joined the U.S. Christian Commission in the Shenandoah Valley assisting soldiers and freed slaves. In 1865 the New England's Freewill Baptist Home Mission Society sponsored Brackett in establishing a primary school for former slaves and in supervising several dozen northern women from the North who were teaching in Free Will Baptist schools throughout the Shenandoah Valley. Also in 1865 Brackett married Louise Wood of Lewiston, Maine, who was also an 1860 alumna of Bates (Maine State Seminary), and later a vice-principal and teacher for twenty five years at Storer College, teaching drawing, painting, Latin and Greek.

Again with the backing of Oren Cheney, founder and president of the Free Will Baptist Church in Ocean Park, Maine, Brackett founded Storer College in October 1867. Brackett served as president of Storer until 1897 and treasurer until his death in 1910. He also was on the Harpers Ferry Town Council and superintendent of free schools there, and a co-founder and regent of the Bluefield Colored Institute (now Bluefield State College) and as president of the board. He had a son, Ledru Joshua Brackett, born on 29 March 1873, in Harpers Ferry, West Virginia.
