= Bolivar, West Virginia =

- Town
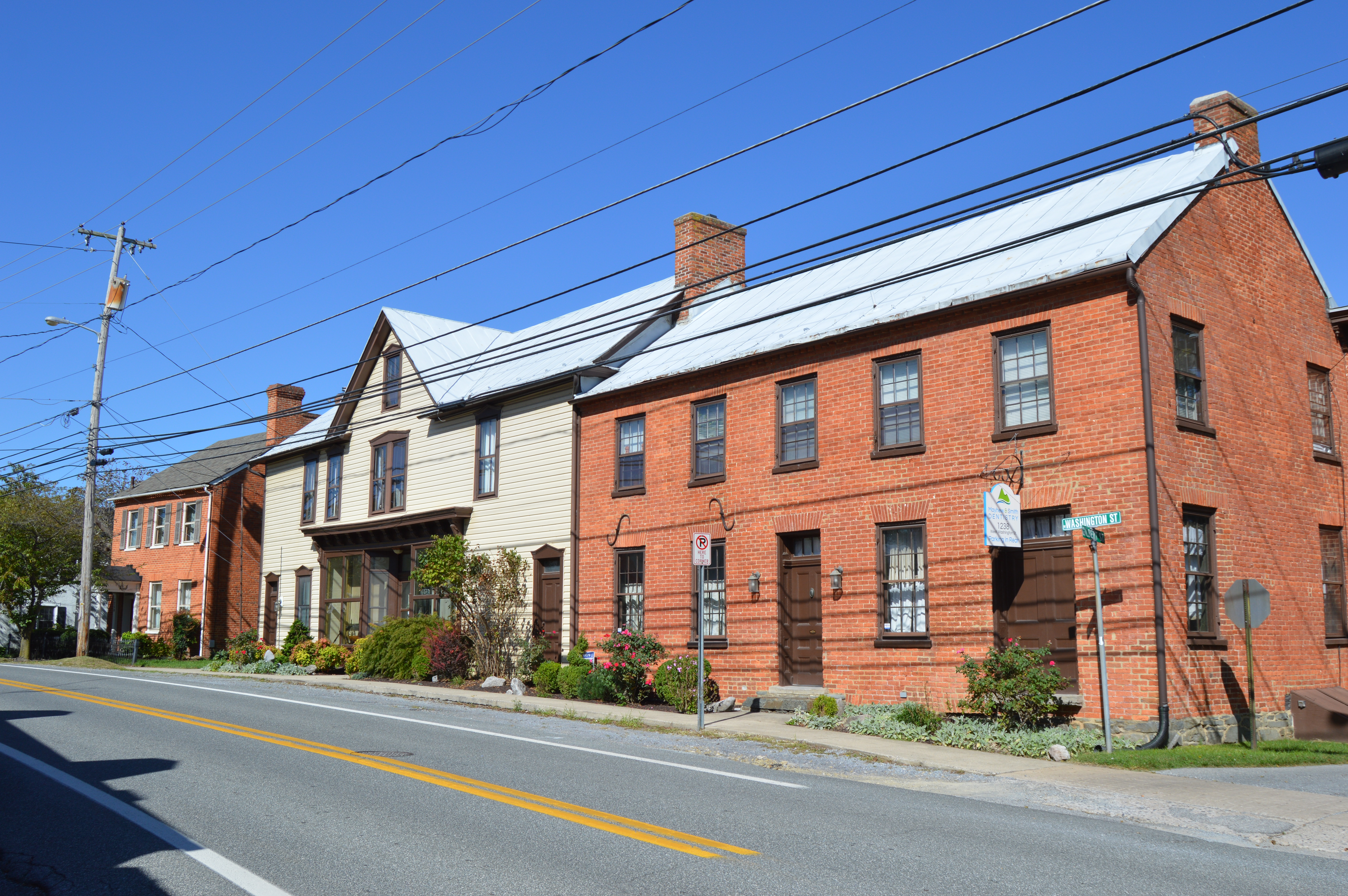
- Houses on Washington Street

- Flag Seal

- Location of Bolivar in Jefferson County, West Virginia.

- Location within Eastern Panhandle of West Virginia Location within West Virginia Location within the United States
- Coordinates: 39°19′25″N 77°44′58″W
- Country: United States
- State: West Virginia
- County: Jefferson
- Established: 1797
- Incorporated: December 29, 1825
- Incorporated: March 27, 1877

Area
  - Total: 0.43 sq mi (1.12 km^{2})
  - Land: 0.43 sq mi (1.12 km^{2})
  - Water: 0 sq mi (0.00 km^{2})
- Elevation: 509 ft (155 m)

Population (2020)
  - Total: 1,036
  - Density: 2,359.4/sq mi (910.98/km^{2})
- Time zone: UTC-5 (EST)
  - Summer (DST): UTC-4 (EDT)
- Area code: 304
- FIPS code: 54-08932
- GNIS feature ID: 2390738
- Website: https://www.bolivarwv.org/

Bolivar (/ˈbɒlɪvər/ BO-liv-er) is a town in Jefferson County, West Virginia, United States. The population was 1,072 at the 2020 census.

== History ==
The town is named for South American revolutionary leader Simón Bolívar. Located in West Virginia's Eastern Panhandle, it is part of the northwestern fringes of the Washington metropolitan area.

The Appalachian Trail passes directly through nearby Harpers Ferry, which some consider the psychological midpoint of the trail, although the physical midpoint is further north, in Pennsylvania. Uniquely, the towns of Harpers Ferry and Bolivar partnered with the ATC to be declared a united Appalachian Trail Community.

== Geography ==
Bolivar is contiguous with, and immediately up-hill from, the famous historic town Harpers Ferry.

According to the United States Census Bureau, the town has a total area of 0.44 square miles (1.14 km^{2}), all land.

== Demographics ==
Historical population
Census	Pop.	Note	%±
1850	1,054		—
1860	1,130		7.2%
1880	822		—
1890	804		−2.2%
1900	781		−2.9%
1910	687		−12.0%
1920	585		−14.8%
1930	616		5.3%
1940	628		1.9%
1950	637		1.4%
1960	754		18.4%
1970	943		25.1%
1980	672		−28.7%
1990	1,013		50.7%
2000	1,045		3.2%
2010	1,045		0.0%
2020	1,036		−0.9%
U.S. Decennial Census

=== 2010 census ===
As of the census of 2010, there were 1,045 people, 498 households, and 266 families living in the town. The population density was 2,375.0 inhabitants per square mile (917.0/km^{2}). There were 565 housing units at an average density of 1,284.1 per square mile (495.8/km^{2}). The racial makeup of the town was 93.4% White, 4.5% African American, 0.2% Native American, 0.3% Asian, 0.3% from other races, and 1.3% from two or more races. Hispanic or Latino of any race were 1.3% of the population.

There were 498 households, of which 23.5% had children under the age of 18 living with them, 40.8% were married couples living together, 9.0% had a female householder with no husband present, 3.6% had a male householder with no wife present, and 46.6% were non-families. 40.4% of all households were made up of individuals, and 15.6% had someone living alone who was 65 years of age or older. The average household size was 2.10 and the average family size was 2.81.

The median age in the town was 43.7 years. 17.5% of residents were under the age of 18; 8.3% were between the ages of 18 and 24; 25.5% were from 25 to 44; 32.5% were from 45 to 64; and 16.1% were 65 years of age or older. The gender makeup of the town was 46.1% male and 53.9% female.

=== 2000 census ===
As of the census of 2000, there were 1,045 people, 479 households, and 274 families living in the town. The population density was 2,141.1 inhabitants per square mile (826.7/km^{2}). There were 519 housing units at an average density of 1,063.4 per square mile (410.6/km^{2}). The racial makeup of the town was 91.10% White, 5.36% African American, 0.67% Native American, 0.48% Asian, 0.19% Pacific Islander, 0.48% from other races, and 1.72% from two or more races. Hispanic or Latino of any race were 1.63% of the population.

There were 479 households, out of which 23.4% had children under the age of 18 living with them, 43.6% were married couples living together, 10.4% had a female householder with no husband present, and 42.6% were non-families. 35.3% of all households were made up of individuals, and 13.2% had someone living alone who was 65 years of age or older. The average household size was 2.18 and the average family size was 2.83.

In the town, the population was spread out, with 20.8% under the age of 18, 7.7% from 18 to 24, 30.0% from 25 to 44, 25.0% from 45 to 64, and 16.6% who were 65 years of age or older. The median age was 39 years. For every 100 females, there were 90.3 males. For every 100 females age 18 and over, there were 92.6 males.

The median income for a household in the town was $42,375, and the median income for a family was $47,375. Males had a median income of $36,667 versus $25,500 for females. The per capita income for the town was $20,969. About 8.1% of families and 12.5% of the population were below the poverty line, including 14.3% of those under age 18 and 16.4% of those age 65 or over.

== Transportation ==
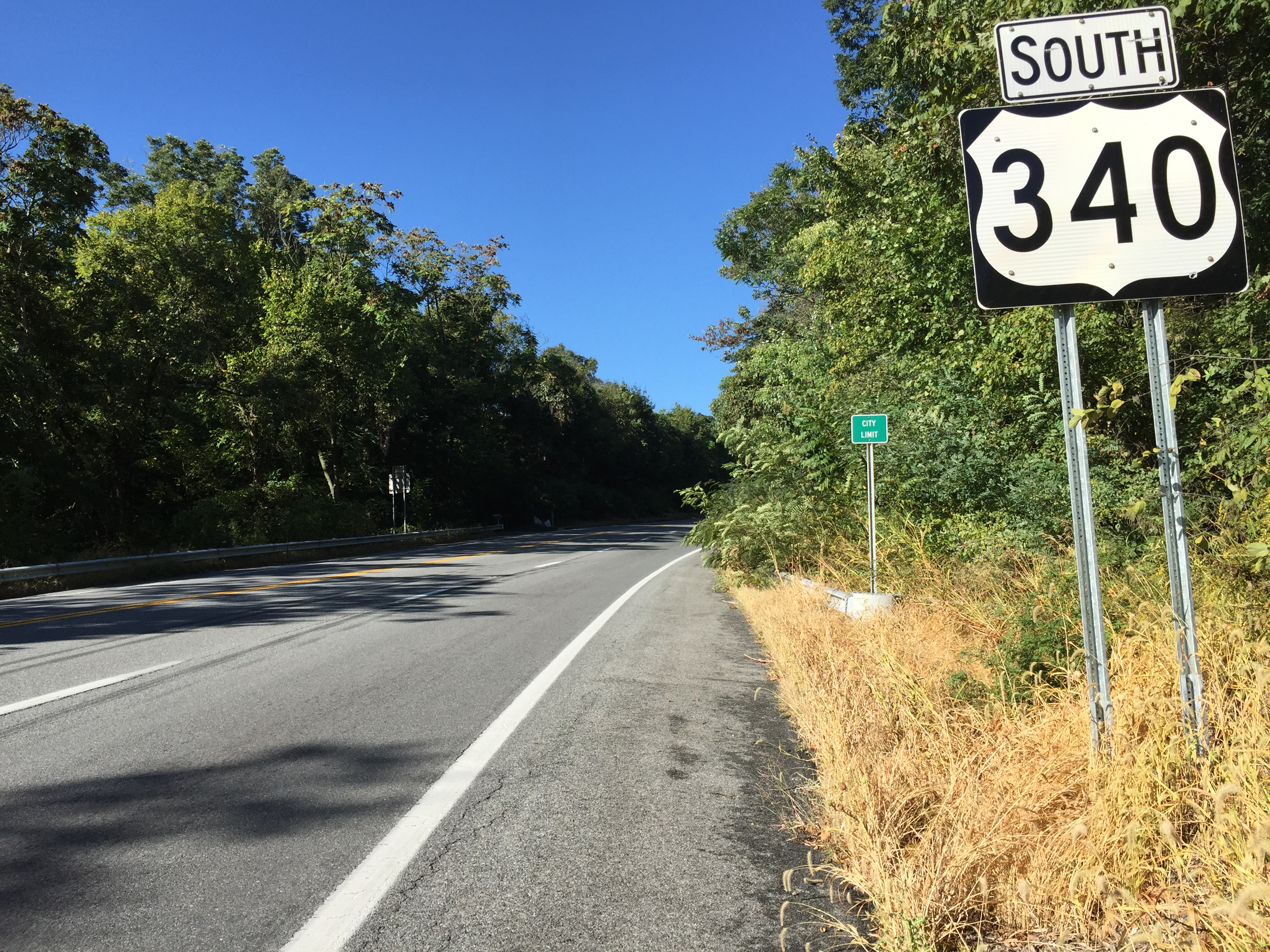
US 340 southbound in Bolivar

The only significant highway providing access to Bolivar is U.S. Route 340. Although signed north–south, the road runs generally eastward from Bolivar. It briefly passes through Harpers Ferry, then traverses the northern tip of Loudoun County, Virginia after crossing the Shenandoah River, quickly crosses the Potomac River into Maryland and eventually reaches its terminus at Frederick. To the west, U.S. Route 340 passes through Charles Town before turning southwest and traversing the eastern edge of Virginia's Shenandoah Valley. Bolivar and neighboring Harpers Ferry also host an unsigned alternate route of U.S. Route 340, which follows Washington Street through Bolivar.

Bolivar has a bus shelter for the Eastern Panhandle Transit Authority (EPTA) located in front of the Charles Town Bank.
