= Charles Franklin Phillips =

American economist

4th President of Bates College
- In office March 1, 1944 – November 1, 1967
- Preceded by: Clifton Daggett Gray
- Succeeded by: Thomas Hedley Reynolds

Deputy Administrator of the Office of Price Administration
- In office March 10, 1937 – July 1, 1941
- Preceded by: Chester Bowles
- Succeeded by: Prentiss M. Brown

Personal details
- Born: May 25, 1910 Nelson, Pennsylvania, U.S.
- Died: March 3, 1998 (aged 87) Auburn, Maine, U.S.
- Education: Colgate University; Harvard University
- Profession: Economist and academic administrator

Charles Franklin Phillips (May 25, 1910 – March 3, 1998) was an American economist who served as the fourth President of Bates College from March 1944 to November 1967. Previous to his assumption of the Bates presidency, he was the deputy administrator of the U.S. Office of Price Administration from March 1937 to July 1941.

Upon being elected the youngest president in Bates history at 34, he increased the student body to 1,004, created the college's study-abroad program, and added $5 million to the endowment, more than quadrupling it. At his death he left $9 million to the college in his will and testament. He was known for employing economic principles of competition and market share when dealing with students which ultimately lead him to be successful institutionally but unpopular with students.

== Early life and career ==
Phillips was born in Nelson, Pennsylvania on May 25, 1910. He went on to earn a bachelor's degree in economics from Colgate University and a Ph.D. from Harvard University. Phillips then went on to teach, research, and write as an economics professor at Colgate. He served as the deputy administrator in the United States Office of Price Administration and Civilian Supplies from March 10, 1937, to July 1, 1941.

He was a full professor at Colgate and a leading economist before coming to Bates.

At age 34, Phillips became the fourth president of Bates College, on March 1, 1944. As president, Phillips initiated the core study program and 3/4 option allowing students to graduate in three years. He also initiated the study abroad program, oversaw the construction of many new buildings at Bates, and had the college's observatory demolished. He is known for initiating the Bates academic program of Education, championing the most traditional strength of the Bates: the liberal arts which featured a core curriculum of liberal arts. He also championed "3/4 option," permitting a three-year degree from Bates. Phillips expanded the campus with the additions of Memorial Commons (now known as Chase Hall), Health Center, Dana Chemistry Hall, Lane Hall, Page Hall, and Schaeffer Theater.

== Death and legacy ==
Charles Franklin Phillips died on March 3, 1998, in Auburn, Maine.

Upon his death, he and his wife, Evelyn, left $9,000,000 to Bates in his will and testament. This bequest was used to fund the Phillips Fellowships, which are granted to students for research abroad. Phillip's donation is believed to be the largest bequest by an American college president to a college that he did not attend.

== See also ==
- History of Bates College
- List of Bates College people
