= Donald West Harward =

American philosopher

Don Harward

6th President of Bates College
- In office March 1, 1989 – November 1, 2002
- Preceded by: Thomas Hedley Reynolds
- Succeeded by: Elaine Tuttle Hansen

Personal details
- Education: Maryville College (BA); American University (MA); University of Maryland (PhD)
- Profession: Philosopher

Donald West "Don" Harward is an American philosopher who served as the sixth President of Bates College from March 1989 to November 2002, where he was succeeded by the first female president, Elaine Tuttle Hansen.

== Early life and career ==
Harward received his B.A. in mathematics from Maryville College in 1961, then his M.A. from American University, and Ph.D. in philosophy from the University of Maryland in 1971. Harward then taught at the University of Delaware and the College of Wooster, where he served as a dean and vice president of academic affairs.

On March 1, 1989, Harward was tapped to succeed Thomas Hedley Reynolds as the sixth President of Bates College. His first years leading the college revolved around stressing the importance of egalitarian values and involvement in the community through the creation of a thesis program, and the strengthening of the study-abroad program. Overall, he would create 22 new programs available to students and faculty. He expanded the campus of Bates by constructing Pettengill Hall, the Residential Village, and the Bates College Coastal Center at Shortridge.

Harward stepped down from the Bates presidency on November 1, 2002. Three years later in 2005, The Harward Center for Community Partnerships was opened in Lewiston in his honor.

Harward currently serves as a senior advisor for the American Council on Education Fellows Program and a senior fellow with the American Association of American Colleges and Universities.

He received an honorary doctorate from Bates College on May 26, 2003.

== Personal life ==
He had two children with his wife, Ann Cobean McIlhenny Harward, who died in 2009.

== See also ==
- History of Bates College
- List of Bates College people
