= George Colby Chase =

American intellectual and professor of English

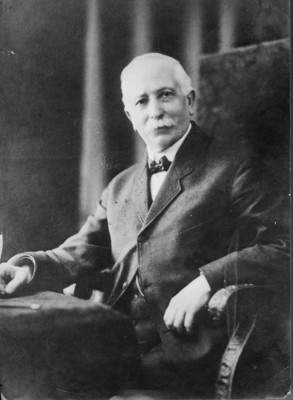

2nd President of Bates College
- In office March 1, 1894 – November 1, 1919
- Preceded by: Oren Burbank Cheney
- Succeeded by: Clifton Daggett Gray

Personal details
- Born: March 15, 1844 Unity, Maine, U.S.
- Died: May 27, 1919 (aged 75) Lewiston, Maine, U.S.
- Education: Bates College; Harvard University
- Profession: Scholar of English, academic administrator

George Colby Chase (March 15, 1844 - May 27, 1919) was an American intellectual and professor of English who served as the second President of Bates College succeeding its founder, Oren Burbank Cheney, from March 1894 to November 1919.

Known as "the great builder," Chase constructed 22 new academic buildings and residential dorms on the campus of the college, tripled the number of students and faculty as well as quadrupling the financial endowment to one million dollars. Chase is notable for being the first and only alumnus of Bates to be elected its president.

== Life and career ==
Chase was born on March 15, 1844, in Unity, Maine. His parents were Freewill Baptists. At age 18 Chase enrolled at the Maine State Seminary and graduated from the Seminary program in 1864. He then enrolled in the college program at Bates College, graduating in 1868. After graduation he taught at the New Hampton Literary Institute, eventually returning to teach at Bates in 1870. In the 1870s, in pursuit his life's work, he returned to Lewiston and enrolled in the theological school, which later became a part of the college's religion department. Meanwhile, the Bates offered him a professorship of Greek and he spent the next year teaching and pursuing his studies in theology. After his spell teaching Greek he moved to teaching English.

In order to better prepare himself, he spent a year as a graduate student at Harvard, returning in 1872 to join the Bates faculty as Professor of Rhetoric and English Literature. Chase attended Bates' Cobb Divinity School while teaching, but eventually decided not to pursue a career in ministry. Chase then studied at Harvard University, returning to Bates in 1872 to teach Rhetoric and English.

Chase taught for 22 years and during that time his administrative skills were noticed by the current Bates College president, Oren Burbank Cheney. In the 1880s Chase took on many of the president's fundraising responsibilities, and in 1894, Chase became Bates' second president when Oren Burbank Cheney retired. As president Chase greatly expanded the college campus, student body, and the endowment. Chase served as president until his death in 1919. He died shortly after signing the diplomas for the class of 1919. His house on Frye Street is currently part of college, and Chase Hall is named after him.

He received several honorary degrees including University of New Brunswick and Bowdoin College.

In 1872, he married Emma F. Millett, a former member of the Bates College's first graduating class. They had five children: George, Emma, Muriel, Elizabeth and Caroline. Chase died at his home in Lewiston, Maine, on May 27, 1919, at the age of 75.

== Legacy ==
Chase was honored by Bates with the construction of Chase Hall, which houses the Student Activities Center, the college book store, the postal center, the offices of several student organizations.

== See also ==
- History of Bates College
- List of Bates College people
