= Clifton Daggett Gray =

American minister and college president

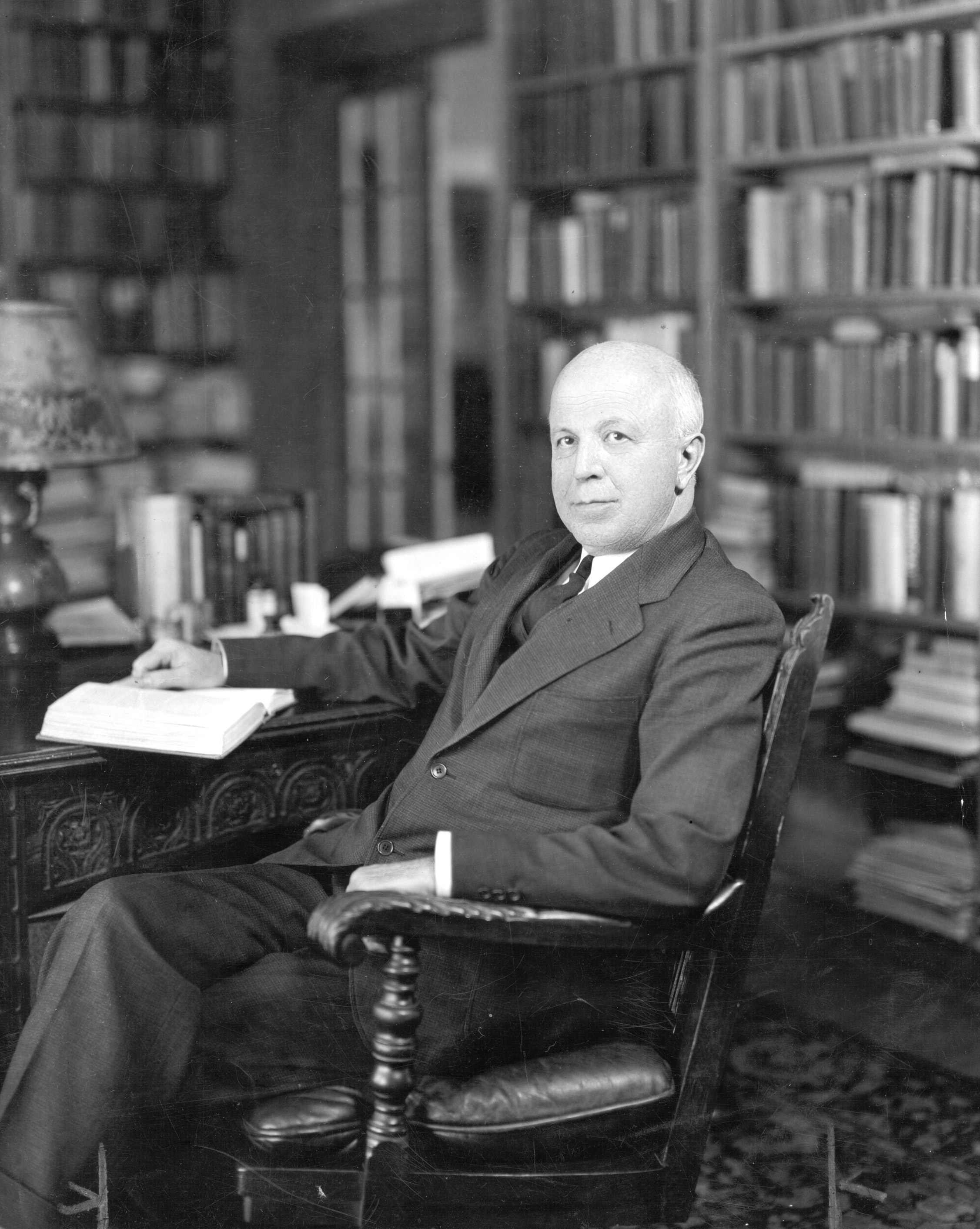

3rd President of Bates College
- In office March 1, 1920 – November 1, 1944
- Preceded by: George Colby Chase
- Succeeded by: Charles Franklin Phillips

Personal details
- Born: July 27, 1874 Boston, Massachusetts, U.S.
- Died: February 21, 1948 (aged 73) Lewiston, Maine, U.S.
- Education: Harvard University; University of Chicago
- Profession: Minister

Clifton Daggett Gray (July 27, 1874 – February 21, 1948) was an American minister who served as the third President of Bates College from March 1920 to November 1944.

Under his tenure the debate team began to compete internationally and hosted the University of Oxford's Oxford Union's first American debate in Lewiston; Gray is known as the "father of the Brooks Quimby Debate Council." He led the college through the Wall Street crash of 1929 to a $2 million endowment and introduced the V-12 Naval Training Program at the college.

== Life and career ==
Gray was born on July 27, 1874, in Boston, Massachusetts, graduating from Harvard University in 1897 and then receiving a Ph.D. from the University of Chicago. Gray then served as a Free Will Baptist pastor and editor of The Standard, a Baptist periodical.

Clifton Daggett Gray became Bates' third president in 1919, serving until 1944. He continued his predecessor's expansion of the academic side of Bates, but his tenure also saw significant changes in other aspects of college life. On-campus dancing was officially sanctioned, hazing was abolished, and student orientation and socializing rules were more formally established.

As president, Gray greatly expanded the college's endowment and was active in the Bates debate program. He helped to organize the first intercontinental debate: Bates debated Oxford University in 1921. During World War II, Gray was instrumental in bringing a V-12 Navy unit to train officers at the college.

Gray served as president of Bates until 1944, when he retired.

== Death and legacy ==
Gray died on February 21, 1948, in Lewiston, Maine, four years after he retired from the presidency.

Bates College honored Gray by naming their main athletic gymnasium after him. The Gray Athletic Building (Gray Cage) at Bates is home to basketball games, and student and faculty activities.
