= Oren Burbank Cheney =

American politician and activist (1816–1903)

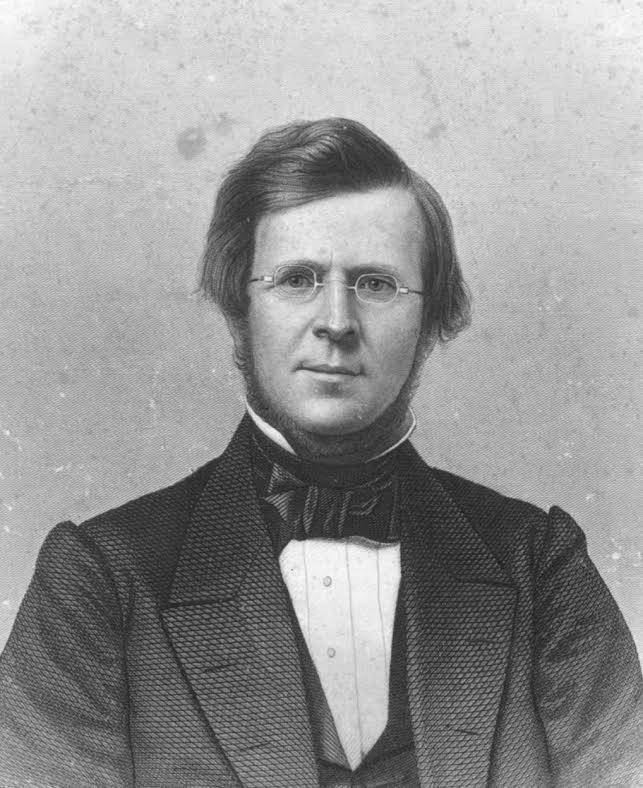

1st President of Bates College
- In office March 16, 1855 – March 1, 1894
- Succeeded by: George Colby Chase

Member of the Maine House of Representatives from the 86th district
- In office December 12, 1851 – November 3, 1852
- Preceded by: Ephraim K. Smart
- Succeeded by: Israel Washburn
- Constituency: Augusta, Maine, U.S.

Personal details
- Born: December 10, 1816 Holderness, New Hampshire, U.S.
- Died: December 22, 1903 (aged 87) Lewiston, Maine, U.S.
- Resting place: Riverside Cemetery; Lewiston, Maine, U.S.
- Party: Liberty Party 1842-1850; Free Soil Party 1851-1853; Republican Party 1854-1903
- Spouses: Caroline A. Rundlett (m. 1840; died 1846) Nancy S. Perkins (m. 1847; died 1886) Emeline S. Burlingame (m. 1892; died 1903)
- Relations: Person & Elisas Hutchins Cheney (brothers)
- Parent(s): Abigail and Moses Cheney
- Education: Dartmouth College
- Occupation: Abolitionist, university founder, state representative

Oren Burbank Cheney (December 10, 1816 – December 22, 1903) was an American statesman and minister who was a key figure in the abolitionist movement in the United States during the later 19th century. Along with textile tycoon Benjamin Bates, he founded Bates College as the first coeducational college in New England which is widely considered his magnum opus. Cheney is one of the most extensively covered subjects of neoabolitionism, for his public denouncement of slavery, involuntary servitude, and advocation for fair and equal representation, egalitarianism, and individual freedoms.

He was ordained a minister in his early twenties, became the headmaster at Parsonsfield, Maine, and illegally harbored and transferred slaves to safety during the 1840s in New Hampshire. His religious community work garnered him widespread support, culminating in a seat in the Maine House of Representatives. With the Free Soil party, Cheney passed laws on prohibition, temperance, the 1851 Maine Liquor Law, and provided the funds for his first school – the Lebanon Academy in Lebanon, Maine. He gave many abolitionist speeches to the legislature, which produced mixed reactions and death threats.

He was elected as the only delegate to attend the 1852 Free Soil Party Convention in Pittsburgh from Maine, where he famously advocated for anti-slavery, and physically threatened the owner of a local tavern for refusing to serve Frederick Douglass, a noted abolitionist and black member of the party. After his political career, he continued to publish anti-slavery pieces in his newspaper. He governed as the first President of Bates College for nearly four decades – from 1855 to 1894 – creating its academic curriculum, hiring faculty, and building its campus; during this time he adopted the moniker O.B. Cheney.

== Early life and family ==
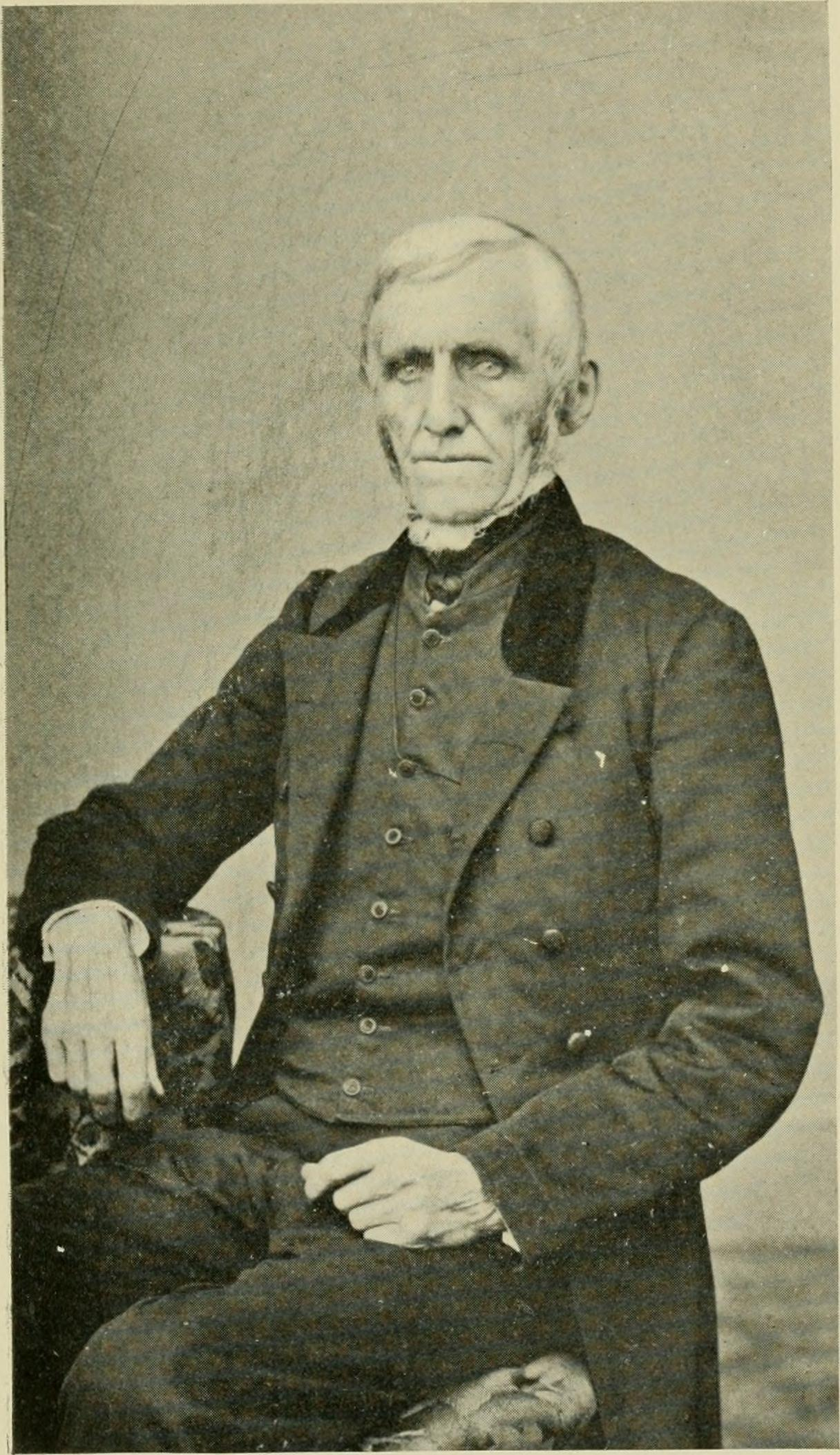
Oren Cheney's father, Moses Cheney, a prominent minister and abolitionist

=== Birth and youth ===
Oren Burbank Cheney was born in Holderness, New Hampshire, on December 10, 1816. He was born to Abigail and Moses Cheney, who were noted abolitionists. Cheney's brother, Person, would go on to become a prominent politician in New Hampshire. His father was a paper manufacturer and also a conductor on the Underground Railroad. Moses Cheney held important positions in the church and served many times in the state legislature. Cheney's mother had a significant impact on his religious views, he was often quoted as saying, "my mother used this bible to worship all that is holy, I shall cease when I arise to the heavenly skies that welcome me," later in his life as president of Bates College. His household was deeply religious and he credited his "Godly upbringing" with forming his philosophical ideologies and personal convictions.

Early in his life he was known as a "humble, patient, and soft-spoken boy." When he was eight years old, he was enrolled in Sunday School in Holderness, and his parents were criticized for sending him to a newly founded school, as it was started by a cashier who found God later in life and was not considered "God's child from birth." He began to work at age nine at the school and spent his allowance on honey and gingerbread, considered luxuries at the time. His rebellious side was exposed on numerous occasions, most notably when a Free Will Baptist came to the family's house to recite lessons; Cheney jumped and stabbed the windowsill with his jack-knife scaring everyone in the room, and establish an ongoing reputation of the young boy. Soon after Sunday School, Cheney began to work at his father's paper mill, tending to the engines, and housekeeping, at night. The paper he would form would go on to print the very first copy of The Morning Star, the single most important newspaper of Free Will Baptists. At age thirteen, he attended the New Hampton Academical and Theological Institute in 1829–30, which was five miles away. His mother's decision to send him so far way was partly based on Cheney's unhealthy interest with knives; he cut the end of his thumb while husking corn. Cheney's demanding personality was developed quickly as he taught at elementary schools during his time at New Hampton. A notable example of this was when a drunken father stumbled into the school yard accusing a young Cheney of disciplining his child in unfair ways; Cheney drew his measuring stick and quieted the man. While at the New Hampton Institute, he was exposed to Free Will Baptism at a personal level through his studies and peer interactions, and soon after returned to his father's mill. After the mill was made sustainable through the hiring of other local school boys, Cheney was sent to Parsonsfield Seminary, which was 14 miles away; a three-day trip.

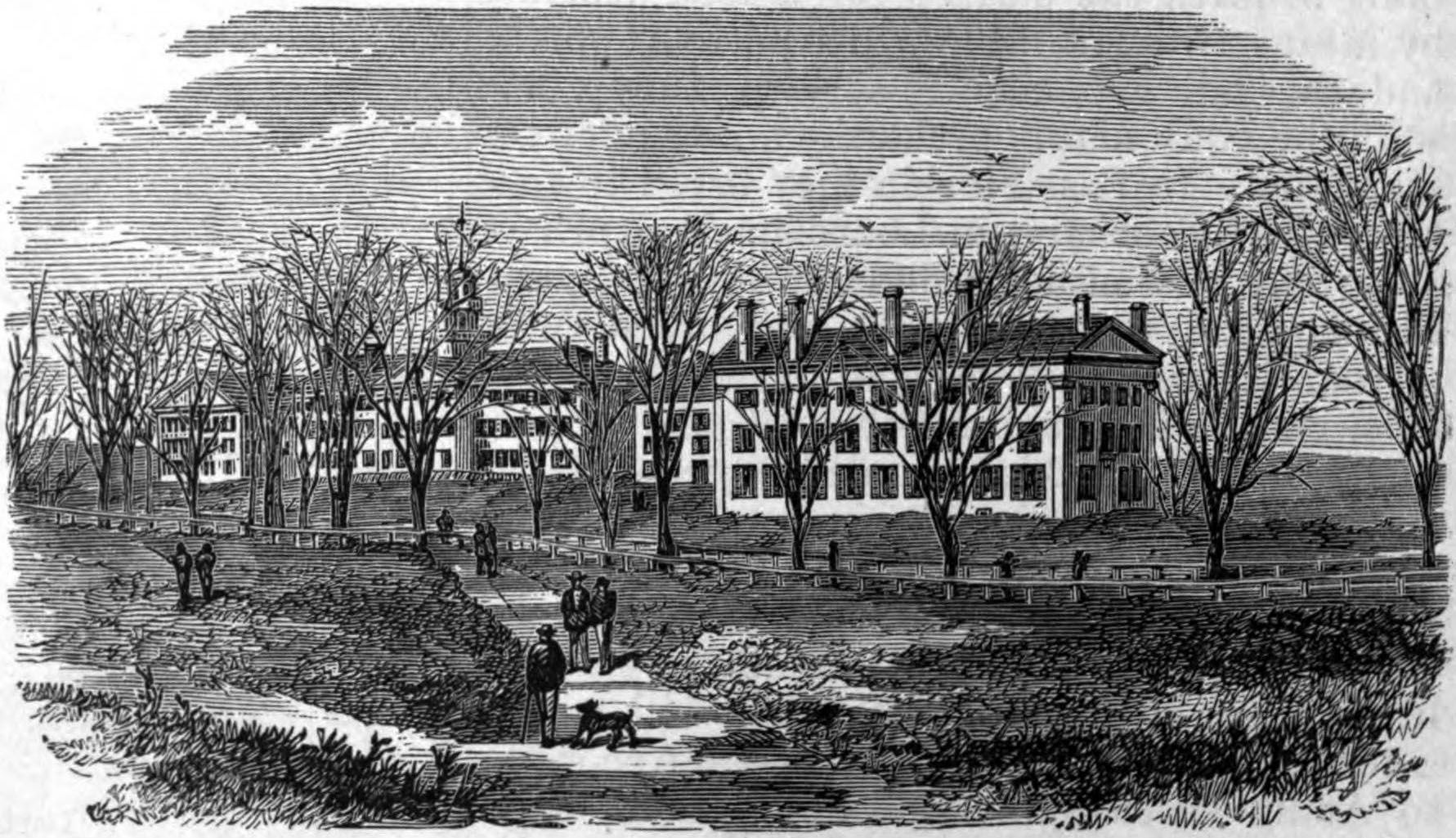
Dartmouth during the 1800s

While going through Parsonsfield, he was surrounded by racial segregation and religious oppression and later in life, sought an educational institution that catered to everyone that required it, that would take the form of a rigorous, and academically prominent school. He was interested in the temperance movement early on and founded his school's temperance society.

=== Education and ministership ===
In 1836, Cheney enrolled in Brown University, but while in Providence witnessed mobs violently treating people with the same religious and political beliefs as he had. Although he was excited by the commotion involved, he decided he was better off studying at a school that offered him a higher degree of physical safety. He transferred to Dartmouth College, due to their significant tolerance of abolitionism. His choice was also heavily influenced by the Dartmouth College v. Woodward case which would later become a guiding case in the foundation of Bates College. Soon after being admitted, he accepted a teaching position in Canaan, New Hampshire but his goals were hindered before he could seriously impact the communities' politics. During the night, the townspeople rode ox with the building strapped to wooden rollers into the swamp and left it there unattended. Cheney enrolled in Dartmouth in 1836, and founded a missionary organization that helped in the education of Indians. He felt a deep connection with the college, and was reported meditating near the grave of Eleazar Wheelock, the founder of the college. While at the college, he participated in numerous outings with classmates to anti-slavery meetings in Hanover. He described the events as:

A crowd of men and boys with drums and horns for the purpose of making a disturbance... Boys were allowed to vote at the age of twenty-one, so they voted in the interest of the anti-slavery movement... The waving of handkerchiefs by women young and old, and the cheers from the crowd showed how great a victory we had over the pro-slavery spirit that was thought to have crushed us.

In May 1836, he walked back to his old home in Ashland, New Hampshire, a trek of 40 miles, walking due to financial restrictions, to be baptized. On his way back to Dartmouth, he began to devote himself to teaching and academia, supplementing his income by pursuing teaching jobs around New Hampshire. He graduated from the university in 1839. He returned to Parsonsfield, a stop on the Underground Railroad, for several years in the 1840s as an alumnus and went on to lead the school as its head master. He founded the Lebanon Academy in Lebanon, Maine in 1850. During this time, he worked for the Underground Railroad, and along with his second brother, Elias Hutchins, illegally harbored and transferred slaves from Windy Row, New Hampshire to Hancock. This was, under the federal Fugitive Slave acts, highly illegal. His reputation earned him a visit from noted abolitionist, Frederick Douglass, who stayed at his home during the 1840 New England Anti-Slavery Society Convention. It was reported that during this time four slave bounty hunters went missing in Hancock.

On January 30, 1840, he married Caroline A. Rundlett and they had one child, Horace Rundlett Cheney. He later attended the Free Will Baptist Bible School in Whitestown, New York to study theology but had to leave following his wife's death in June 1846. In 1844, Cheney was ordained as a Free Will Baptist minister, but he left the ministership after some years due to their position on slavery. In 1847, the widower Cheney married Nancy S. Perkins. They had two children, Caroline and Emeline. Nancy died in 1886. In July 1892, Cheney married Emeline S. Burlingame, a widow, who survived him. His only son, Horace Cheney, was admitted to Bowdoin College in Brunswick as one of the 100 students allowed to study at the university during the early 19th century.

== Political career ==
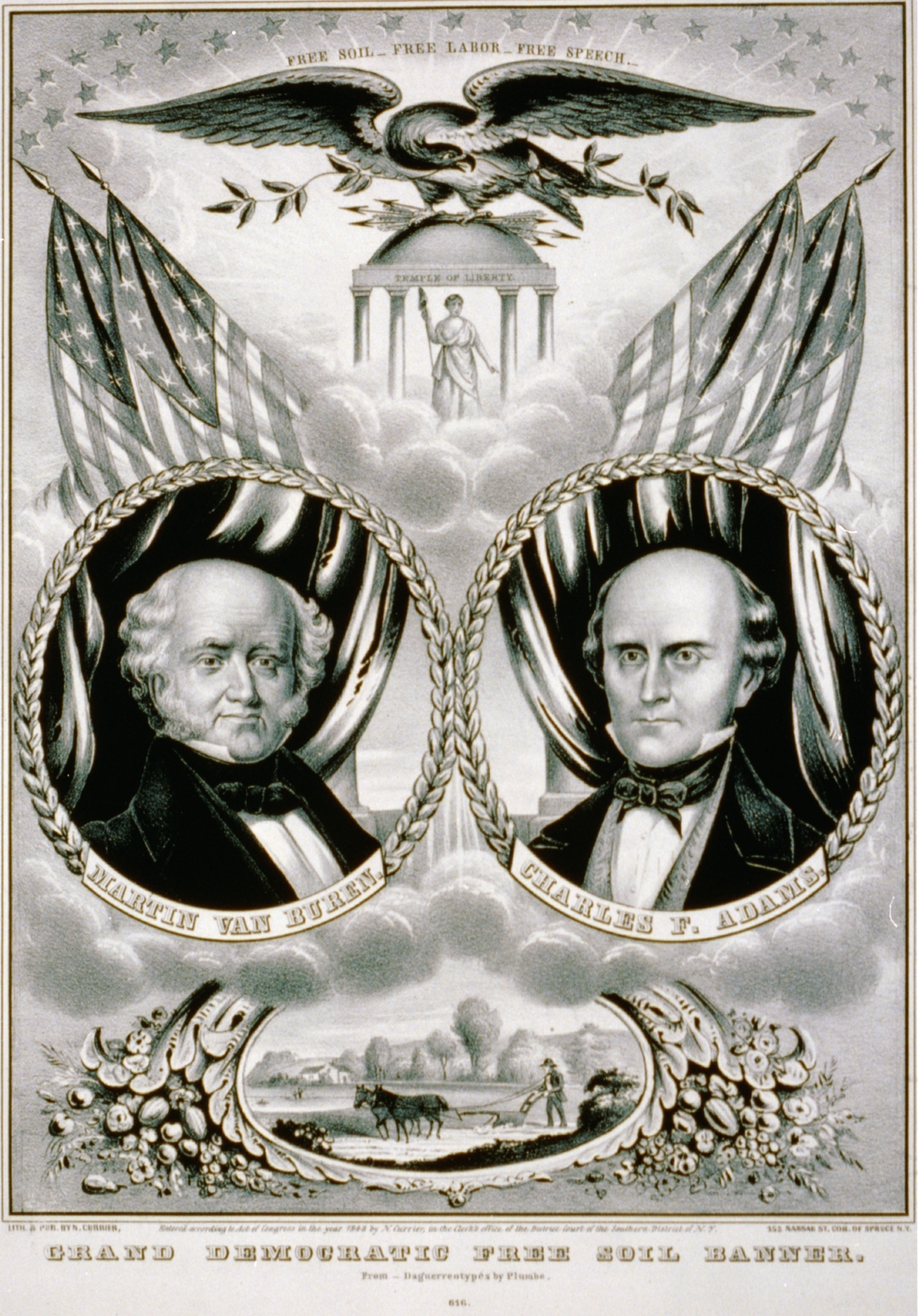
Free Soil Party poster

Cheney's political efficacy started at a young age, but his first official political declaration was to be his first vote in which he cast a vote for James G. Briney, a member of the Liberty Party. Briney lost the elections in the Maine House of Representatives, however, one year later, Cheney was nominated without anyone telling him he was nominated. He won the elections in early December 1851, and while on trip to speak with community leaders in Augusta, aids told him that he had been nominated and elected to the legislature. They took a detour and he was inducted as a Member of the Maine House of Representatives representing the 86th district of Augusta, Maine later that day. His early tenure in the legislature as a Free Soil politician was tacked to state prohibition, he first bills drafted and passed limited the outlawed the sale of alcohol in Maine, with the Maine Liquor Law, and regulated the consumption of it on a district-by-district basis. Cheney also went on to begin to make speeches in the legislature on the principles of abolitionism and egalitarianism to mixed reception. When a congressman asked him to stop giving speeches on the abolition of slavery and the prohibition of alcohol, Cheney replied: "a pile of gold as high as the mountains would not tempt me to stop speaking upon those topic."

During his tenure as a state representative he acquired his father's Free Will Baptist newspaper, The Morning Star. He used the newspaper as a medium for him to print his speeches in the legislature and to write articles supporting abolitionism. His assumption of the newspaper drew attention of a past acquaintance, Frederick Douglass. Cheney asserted in his first printing as owner:

We shall speak against slavery, as we have hitherto done. We can find no language that has the power to express the hatred we have towards so vile and so wicked an institution-We hate it-we abhor, we lather it-we detest it and despise it as a giant sin against God.

His later career in the Maine House of Representatives, secured $2,000 for his academy in Lebanon, regulated liquor traffic, and advocated for temperance. He left his academy shortly after founding it in strong financial conduction and under the care of the local community.

Shortly, before the conclusion his term, he was elected as the delegate to the 1852 Free Soil Party Convention in Pittsburgh, Pennsylvania. During the scheduled speeches at the convention he drew widespread controversy for his speech regarding complete and absolute abolitionism. At the time, the Free Soil Party only believed in anti-slavery not abolitionism. On the final night of the convention the delegates were invited to a local tavern of the State House where they were free to dine with each other. Upon entering the establishment, Frederick Douglass, a fellow delegate was stopped at the door and Cheney was told that "the nigger must not come in." After an intense yelling match between members of the delegation and the owner, Cheney stepped forward and physically the threatened the owner with a beating and told him that if Douglass was not seated first, before anyone else, the entire delegation was to eat elsewhere. With fear of safety and loss of business, the owner conceded and seated Douglass. The event sent a powerful message to the convention, but Cheney's mental stability was rumored to be faulty by members of both sides.

One year later in 1853, he was assigned as a delegate to Free Will Baptist General Conference, and participated in numerous talks that helped establish a political link to the movement. He choose not to seek another term in the Maine Legislature due to his increasingly ineffective legislation giving blacks quasi-rights failed. After stepping down from political office on November 3, 1854, he continued his work with The Morning Star. One the evening of his retirement from political life, he printed one of his more famous lines on the cover of the newspaper:

Live and take comfort. Thou hast left behind powers that will work for thee, air, earth, and skies. Theres not breathing of a common mind that will forget thee. Thou has great allies.

He switched his political affiliation to the Republican Party, due to their liberal and democratic stance on slavery and personal sovereignty. He spent the rest of his life developing the party within Maine.

== Maine State Seminary ==
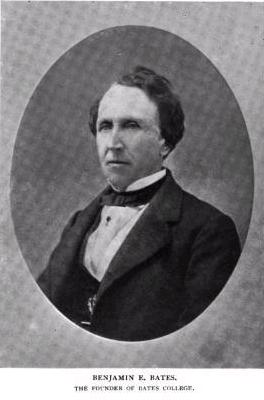
Benjamin Bates

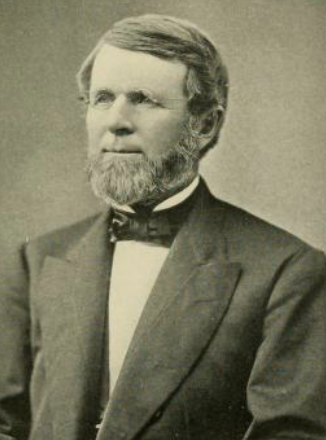
Cheney in his later years, leading Bates College

After news spread to Cheney that his old secondary school, Parsonsfield Seminary, mysteriously burned down in 1853, he began to plan the construction of a new school. Opponents of his political work and abolitionism in general were rumored to be the arsonists behind the destruction of Parsonsfield. Cheney wrote the details of the event in a diary: "the bell tower flickered in flames while the children ran from its pillar-brick walls.." The fire was believed to have killed three school children, and two fugitive slaves, leading to a brief and unsuccessful investigation.

Cheney went back to the Maine State legislature and used his political sway to bypass certain legal proceedings and begin the incorporation of a new school. He began the process by meeting with the religious, political, and social elites of Maine in Topsham to discuss the formation of a new seminary. His idea was met with positive reception and the act of incorporation was drafted. Of the one required, twenty-four petitions were submitted to the Maine State Legislature. After minimal delay, the charter was approved and appropriated with $15,000 for its conception. With the school being established Cheney wrote to Massachusetts Congressman and one of the most established anti-slavery radicals in the country, Charles Sumner, requesting a university motto. Sumner replied with "Amore ac Studio" which means "with ardor and devotion" but is translated as "with love of learning".

Construction of the school began in Parsonsfield, Maine, however, the project drew the attention of millionaire textile tycoon, Benjamin Bates, who took special interest in the college. He convinced Cheney to build his school in the economically booming town of Lewiston, where Bates had begun to develop highly profitable mills. The college was moved to the town and incorporated as the Maine State Seminary on March 16, 1855.

The charter petition paid particular attention to fellow Maine colleges, Bowdoin and Colby College in Brunswick and Waterville, respectively. Cheney wrote specifically with regard to the two colleges:

We do not propose an Academy [referring to Colby College (then Waterville Academy)], but a school of higher order, between a college [referring to Bowdoin College] and an Academy. We shall petition the state legislature to suitably endow, as well as incorporate, such an institution. We know our claim is good and intend openly and manfully and we trust in a Christian spirit to press it. If we fail next winter, we shall try another legislature. If we fail on a second trial, we shall try a third and a fourth.

The Maine State Seminary was founded on the principles of egalitarianism and scholarship. It opened officially in 1865 with one hundred and thirty-seven students and three societies: the Literary Fraternity, Philomathean Society and Ladies' Athenaeum. The school gained a reputation of exacting academic standards and for educating the working class of Maine. The college stood in firm contrast to Bowdoin College in that it advocated for equality and equal access. The relationship between the two colleges is complex. The only college Cheney would oversee was Bowdoin, he served as an overseer from 1860 to 1867. In 1860, Cheney delivered the graduating dress to a class of fifteen male students, stressing "impact in a changing world."

Benjamin Bates began to aggressively fund the college due to its increased status in Americana academia and values. He extended a principal $50,000 to Cheney and at the end of his life, his overall contributions amounted to nearly $300,000.

Deeply moved by the financial backing of Bates, Cheney asked the board of the Seminary to rename the college in his honor. Bates College was chartered on March 16, 1864. Cheney required that admission to Bates be exacting and required testimonials of good moral character, readings of Latin which included Caesar, Cicero, Vergil and elementary French. Cheney made sure that Bates was originally affiliated with the Freewill Baptist denomination and later with the Northern Baptist churches. He often noted Dartmouth v. United States, a Supreme Court case in reinforcing his beliefs that "a college can never pass into the hands of any other people or party without the consent of these churches or their proper representatives."

During the Civil War, Cheney was stirred and encouraged students to fight in the war as a test of their convictions, he said to an incoming class, "the freemen of the north are ready. Slavery must die. I am ready to die for freedom", causing them question the dynamic involved at the school as this was not a student but the President asserting such a statement.

In 1891, Cheney amended the charter to Bates to require that its president and a majority of the trustees be members of the Free Will Baptist denomination. After he retired, this amendment was revoked by the legislature in 1907 at the request of his successor, George Colby Chase, which allowed the college to qualify for Carnegie Foundation funding for professor pensions.

== Death and legacy ==
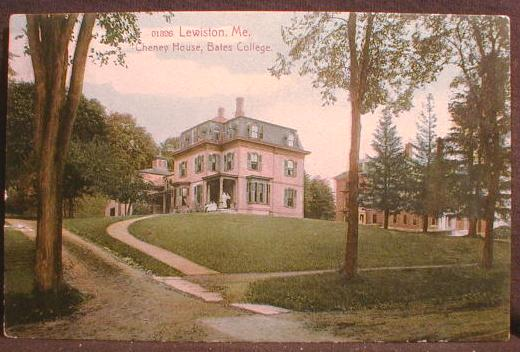
The Cheney House, 1920

Cheney served as Bates' president for 39 years, retiring at age 79 in 1894. Cheney died in 1903 and was buried in Riverside Cemetery in Lewiston.

Cheney also played a major role in founding several other Free Baptist institutions such as Storer College, a school for freed slaves in West Virginia founded in 1867; and the Maine Central Institute (MCI), founded in 1866. Cheney founded and was the first president of the Free Will Baptist Church at Ocean Park, Maine, a seaside retreat on Old Orchard Beach. In 1907, his third wife, Emeline, wrote a biography of his life, using his diaries and autobiographical articles he had published in the Morning Star. The Cheney House, built in 1875 when Cheney was president, was acquired in 1905 by Bates College. Today it is used as a dormitory, a "quiet house" for 32 students.

== See also ==
- History of Bates College
- List of Bates College people

Preceded by none	President of Bates College; 1855–1894	Succeeded by George Colby Chase
