= The Morning Star (New Hampshire newspaper) =

1826–1911 American newspaper

The Morning Star was a weekly newspaper owned and published by Freewill Baptists in 19th-century New England, which campaigned vigorously for the abolition of slavery long before such a political stance was widely considered to be respectable in America. It was published from 1826 to 1911.

== History ==
The first issue was published in Limerick, Maine, on 11 May 1826. Seven years later the newspaper relocated to Dover, New Hampshire, and it continued to be published in that town by Moses Cheney from November 1833 until December 1874. Thereafter it was published in various cities including Portland, Boston, New York and Chicago, until its final issue rolled off the presses in 1911.

John Buzzell, preacher and early editor of The Morning Star

An early editor was John Buzzell, who was also partly responsible for the foundation of the paper.

Until 1834 the newspaper concerned itself mainly with religion, and largely kept out of politics. When it commented on slavery it took a conservative attitude, with editorials denouncing radical abolitionists and counseling "the exercise of moderation and charity".

On the death of the editor Samuel Beede in March 1834, however, control was passed to William Burr, who immediately re-launched The Morning Star as a newspaper that would campaign vigorously and tirelessly for the complete abolition of slavery. This was a remarkable position for an American publication to take at that time, especially in an overwhelmingly white town where the major employers were large cotton mills: Dover's prosperity depended to a great extent, indirectly, on slave labor in the South.

Burr's principled move plunged the newspaper rapidly into crisis. Publication had to be suspended for a while because the New Hampshire State Legislature refused to grant The Morning Star an Act of Incorporation on account of the paper's campaigning activities.

The abolitionist message did not go down well with readers. Sales plummeted, and the editor was denounced by delegates to the 1837 General Conference of Freewill Baptists, who put forward a motion calling for the paper to cease its campaign against slavery "so as to avert from the denomination the public odium heaped upon abolitionists, and to reconcile the disaffected members." The motion was defeated.

In 1841, in protest at the authorities' refusal to act to prevent attacks on black people and abolitionists in segregated railway carriages (including highly publicized incidents involving Charles Lenox Remond and David Ruggles) The Morning Star printed a call for readers to boycott the Eastern Railroad - a remarkable step at that time.

As the public mood became more receptive to the abolitionist message, the circulation figures picked up. While continuing to fulfill its original function as official organ of the Free Will Baptist denomination, The Morning Star continued its vociferous anti-slavery campaign right up to the end of the Civil War, condemning the iniquities of slavery with eloquent and rousing rhetoric.

As an example, when Oren B. Cheney took over as editor in October 1853, he announced his arrival with a thunderous anti-slavery editorial:

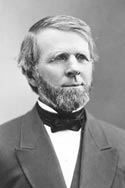
Oren B. Cheney

We shall speak against slavery, as we have hitherto done. We can find no language that has power to express the hatred we have towards so vile and so wicked an institution. We hate it. We abhor it. We loathe it. We detest and despise it as a giant sin against God, and an awful crime upon man. Thus we feel ourself, and thus we teach our children to feel, and dying we will teach them so.

Possibly owing at least partly to the Star's influence, Dover was the first town in New Hampshire to send strongly abolitionist representatives to the State Legislature, and one of the first in the U.S. to send an openly abolitionist senator to Washington, in the person of John Parker Hale.

When, in 1860, Abraham Lincoln visited Dover to canvass support in the presidential elections of that year, editor William Burr was among those invited to join him on the speaker's platform.

Later editors of the Star included George T. Day and George H. Ball.

The Bates College Special Collections library contains a complete collection of original bound editions of The Morning Star.

This Morning Star has no connection with the Morning Star that was published in London at around the same time, nor with the paper of the same name that is published daily in Britain - that publication was founded in 1930 as The Daily Worker, and only changed its name to Morning Star in 1966.
