= Parsonsfield Seminary =

Free Will Baptist seminary in North Parsonsfield, Maine (1832–1949)

- U.S. National Register of Historic Places
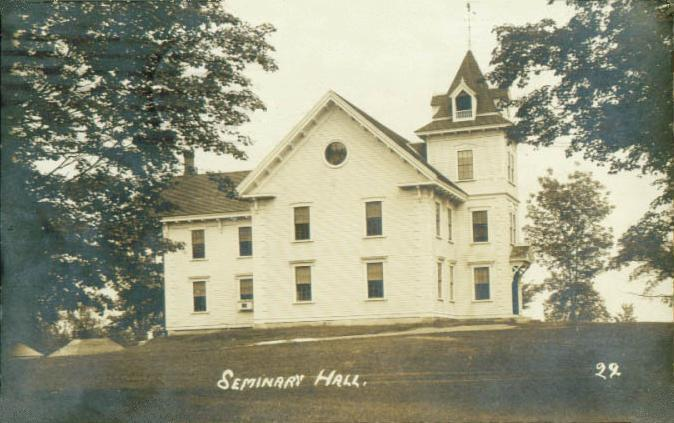

- Location within Maine Location within the United States
- Location: Parsonsfield, Maine
- Coordinates: 43°45′46″N 70°56′20″W
- Built: 1857
- Architectural style: Italianate
- NRHP reference No.: 86001339
- Added to NRHP: June 20, 1986

Parsonsfield Seminary, which operated from 1832 to 1949, was a Free Will Baptist school in North Parsonsfield, Maine, in the United States. Also known as the North Parsonsfield Seminary, its preserved campus of four buildings is located on State Route 160 near the New Hampshire border. The property is listed on the National Register of Historic Places.

== History ==
Free Will Baptists developed as a movement in the late eighteenth century in New Hampshire. In 1832, Rev. John Buzzell and several other Free Baptists founded the school in Parsonsfield. The Seminary, at the level of a high school, was the first Free Will Baptist school in the United States and attracted 140 students, both boys and girls, in its first year. The seminary's first principal, Hosea Quimby, was active in many other Free Will Baptist organizations. The Seminary staff and students became deeply involved with the abolitionist movement and operated as a stop on the Underground Railroad in the 1840s, while Oren B. Cheney was principal. Students and supporters aided fugitive slaves from the South in reaching freedom in Canada. From 1840 to 1842, the Free Baptist Biblical School, the first Free Baptist graduate school for training ministers, was located at the seminary (it was later renamed Cobb Divinity School and became part of Bates College).

=== The burning of Parsonsfield ===
The seminary in the 1800s

Parsonsfield Seminary burned mysteriously in 1853, at midnight. The overall account of the burning remains unclear, with sources varying depending on the actual occurrences. When recounting its burning, Oren Burbank Cheney stated, "The bell tower flickered in flames while the children ran from its pillar-brick walls.." The fire was believed to have killed three schoolchildren and two fugitive slaves, leading to a brief and unsuccessful investigation. The reason as to why the Seminary burned down remains unclear, with opponents of abolitionism traditionally, but not definitively, held accountable. The seminary would later go on to incorporate into the Maine State Seminary, which early benefactor Benjamin Bates would oppose. He advised Cheney to sell the land in Parsonsfield, Maine, and reconstruct it within the newly developing Maine State Seminary. Afterward, Cheney moved the central campus to Lewiston in 1854 to replace it with a larger Free Baptist school more centrally located in Maine.

=== Reconstruction and development ===
In 1857, a smaller seminary building was rebuilt at Parsonsfield. It had a cupola and a weathervane. In 1889, Bartlett Doe, a wealthy San Francisco businessman who was a Parsonsfield native son, purchased the land and donated funds to repair and remodel Seminary Hall, adding its rear wing and front bell tower. His gift provided for the construction of a new dormitory, to which a large annex was added in 1896. He also established a school endowment of $100,000.

Parsonsfield Seminary closed in 1949. The facility was subsequently used by the Consolidated School District until 1986, at which time the school offices moved to new quarters. The two main buildings of the seminary and grounds were listed on the National Register of Historic Places in 1986. To prevent the loss of the historic hilltop campus, the Friends of the Parsonsfield Seminary organized to preserve and maintain the property. The non-profit, non-sectarian organization operates the handsome Victorian buildings and grounds for use for weddings, conferences, seminars, and graduations.

== Notable alumni ==
- Oren B. Cheney, abolitionist, principal of Parsonfield Seminary, founder of Bates College
- Person C. Cheney, senator from New Hampshire
- Samuel W. Gould, congressman
- Lorenzo De Medici Sweat, congressman

== See also ==
- Bates College
- Blazo-Leavitt House
- Cobb Divinity School
- Lapham Institute
- Maine Central Institute
- Storer College
- National Register of Historic Places listings in York County, Maine

== References and external links ==
- Friends of the Parsonsfield Seminary
- Robert Greenleaf Leavitt, Maude Lougee Boothby, Dr. Bernard L. Towle, and Kate E. Barker Thursto. History of Parsonsfield Seminary: 1932 Centennial Edition (1932).
- Musical Spoons at Parsem, Parsonsfield, Maine.
