= Thomas Hedley Reynolds =

American academic

5th President of Bates College
- In office March 1, 1967 – November 1, 1989
- Preceded by: Charles Franklin Phillips
- Succeeded by: Donald West Harward

Personal details
- Born: November 23, 1920 New York City, New York, U.S.
- Died: September 22, 2009 (aged 88) Lewiston, Maine, U.S.
- Education: Williams College; Columbia University
- Profession: Historian and philosopher

Thomas Hedley Reynolds (November 23, 1920 – September 22, 2009) was an American historian and university professor who served as the fifth President of Bates College from March 1967 to November 1989.

His presidency was marked with a renewed focus on academic rigor with the expansion of professor salaries and exacting institutional standards for graduation. Reynolds lead the college through the 1960s and 1970s with expansive integration of feminism, anti-war ideology, and the civil rights movement into the Bates community. The college became known for its academic standards and socially liberal tendencies. During his presidency he diversified the student body and eliminated standardized test scores.

== Life and career ==
Reynolds was born in New York to Wallace and Helen (née Hedley) Reynolds. He attended The Browning School in New York City and graduated from Deerfield Academy in 1938. Reynolds earned a B.A. in political science from Williams College in 1942 and then a master's (1947) and Ph.D. (1953) in American history from Columbia University.

During World War II, Reynolds served as a tank commander in Europe and received various decorations for his service. After obtaining a Ph.D., Reynolds became an author and history professor at Middlebury College before becoming president of Bates College.

Reynolds was elected the fifth president of Bates College in Lewiston, Maine, on March 1, 1967. His presidency was marked with an increased faculty number as well as dramatically increased salary levels. He also improved gender equity within the administration of the college. Reynolds diversified the student body, eliminated standardized test scores, and constructed Ladd Library and the Olin Arts Center. Reynolds also introduced the short-term into the academic calendar.

He frequently joined in on student protests against the Vietnam War and in support for the civil rights movement.

After the college's students established "Newman Day," he received a letter from Paul Newman that denounced the tradition, personally asking him to institutionally bar the activity.

Reynolds retired from the Bates presidency on November 1, 1989.

== Death and legacy ==
Reynolds died on September 22, 2009, in Lewiston, Maine. The Thomas Hedley Reynolds history professorship was endowed in Reynold's honor.

== See also ==
- History of Bates College
- List of Bates College people
