= John Buzzell =

American preacher (1766–1863)

John Buzzell, preacher and early editor of the Morning Star

John Buzzell (1766–1863) was an early proponent of the Free Will Baptist Church, a Christian author, and a preacher.

John Buzzell was born in Barrington, New Hampshire in 1766. "His attainments were above average, early becoming a teacher of common schools. He along with Dr. Moses Sweat, and Rev. Rufus McIntire, founded the Old Parsonsfield Seminary, the first school of his denomination". After befriending Benjamin Randall, Buzzell became a Free Will Baptist and was ordained a minister in 1792. He preached extensively throughout New England. In 1798 Buzzell and his family moved to Parsonsfield, Maine where he continued his ministry and where he helped found the Parsonsfield Seminary. Buzzell wrote extensively and co-founded the Morning Star newspaper in 1826. He was first editor of his denomination's "Morning Star" paper, which position he held seven years. John Buzzell died in 1863 at the age of 96.

== Writings ==
- Buzzell, John (1827). Life of Elder Benjamin Randal. Limerick, ME: Hobbs, Woodman and Co..
