= Holman Melcher =

American military officer and politician

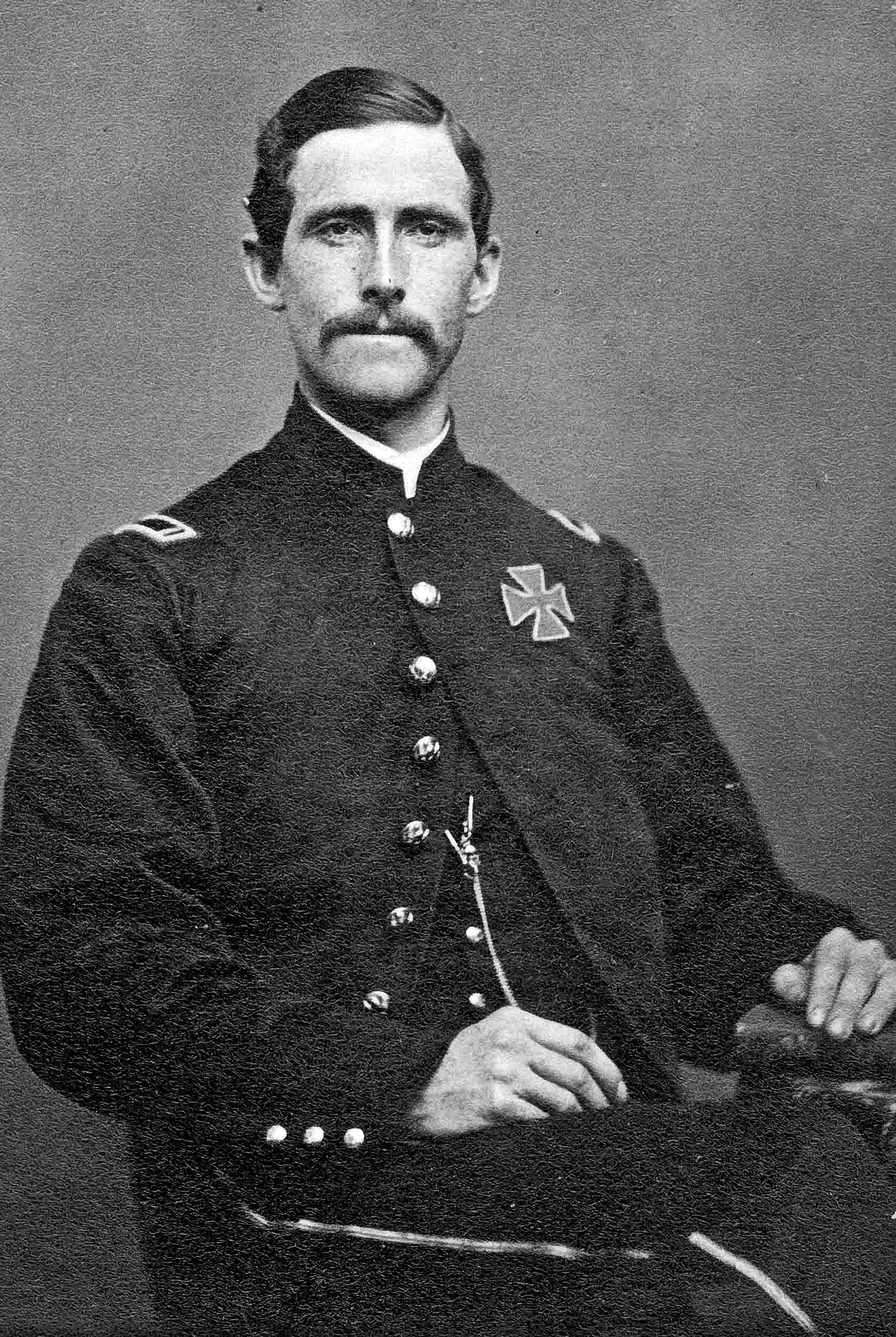
- Melcher in August 1864

34th Mayor of Portland, Maine
- In office January 1, 1889 – January 1, 1890
- Preceded by: Charles J. Chapman
- Succeeded by: George W. True

Personal details
- Born: Holman Staples Melcher; June 30, 1841 Topsham, Maine, U.S.
- Died: June 25, 1905 (aged 64) Portland, Maine, U.S.
- Resting place: Evergreen Cemetery, Portland, Maine, U.S.
- Party: Republican
- Spouse: Alice E. Hart (1874 – 1905; his death)
- Children: Georgiana Hill
- Education: Bates College
- Profession: Soldier, politician, author

Military service
- Allegiance: United States; Union
- Branch/service: United States Army; Union Army
- Years of service: 1862–1865
- Rank: Captain; Brevet Major
- Unit: 20th Maine Infantry Regiment
- Battles/wars: American Civil War: Battle of Shepherdstown; Battle of Fredericksburg; Battle of Gettysburg; Battle of the Wilderness; Battle of Spotsylvania Court House

Holman Staples Melcher (/ˈmɛltʃər/; June 30, 1841 – June 25, 1905) was an American military officer, businessman, and politician active during the Reconstruction Era. A faction of historians and soldiers controversially contend that he led the downhill bayonet charge of Little Round Top during the Battle of Gettysburg. Aside from his feats during the American Civil War, he served two one-year terms as the Mayor of Portland, Maine, from 1889 to 1890.

He first began his formal military career in the 20th Maine Volunteer Infantry Regiment, which was mustered in and equipped in August 1862. The regiment was assigned to the V Corps of the Army of the Potomac, and first engaged in combat at the Battle of Shepherdstown. During the Battle of Antietam, the 20th Maine was held in reserve on a hill near the Pry Farm.

During the Battle of the Wilderness, Melcher led a small company of seventeen men through a forest along the Orange Turnpike needed for alignment with the adjoining company. After being surrounded he ordered his men to lie on the ground and start shooting; they captured thirty Confederates and sustained only minor injuries.

His involvement in the Battle of Spotsylvania Court House in Virginia resulted in his promotion and serious injury. While engaging in the war, he was promoted three different times; starting with first lieutenant in 1863, captain in 1864 and brevet major at Spotsylvania. He was in three different companies during the war, later served on the division staff and was mustered out on July 16, 1865.

== Early life and education ==
Melcher was born in the small town of Topsham, Maine, on June 30, 1841. He was born to James and Nancy Melcher. His father, a farmer, was a native of Brunswick, Maine and his mother was the daughter of Captain Nehemiah Curtis of Harpswell, Maine, who traces his lineage to colonizing New Englanders. As a young boy Holman Melcher worked on his family farm with his brother, Nathaniel, and his sister, Mary. He initially began schooling in towns near Topsham, in a small school district. After graduating from secondary school he enrolled at Bates College (then known as Maine State Seminary), at age fifteen. He was enrolled at the institution from 1858 to 1862, in Lewiston, Maine.

In the spring of 1861, there was an attack on Fort Sumter, which took the nation into the Civil War. During this time Melcher was completing his studies at Bates, and holding a small teaching job in Harpswell. He became engrossed with the patriotism involved with the war and upon concluding his studies he quit his teaching job, and enlisted formally on August 19, 1862 as a private in Company B, 20th Regiment Maine Volunteer Infantry. His brother became interested in following his footsteps but Holman advised him to avoid enlisting and pursue education at Bowdoin College, promising to write each other weekly. A week after enlisting, he was mustered into the United States service at the rank of corporal.

== American Civil War ==
After completing his studies at the seminary, he enlisted as a corporal in the Union Army. Melcher was assigned to the 20th Maine Infantry Regiment which was organized in and equipped at Camp Mason near Portland, Maine, on August 29, 1862 and with it was immediately assigned to the V Corps; serving in that organization for the duration of the war.

The 20th Maine first engaged in combat in the Battle of Shepherdstown Ford; the end of the Maryland Campaign. During the Battle of Fredericksburg, Melcher was promoted to sergeant-major for "meritorious conduct", by Col. Adelbert Ames. On April 20, 1863 he was promoted to first lieutenant of Company F.

On April 2, 1863, Colonel Joshua Chamberlain, appointed him acting Adjutant of the regiment. He served in this position until army restructuring by the incoming General Ulysses S. Grant, in March.

=== Battle of Gettysburg ===
On July 2, 1863, Melcher took part in the bayonet charge at Little Round Top that helped repulse the Confederate attack. On the second day of Battle of Gettysburg, military forces moved to Little Round Top, where Chamberlain began preparing strategic options, as Maj. Gen. Joseph Hooker was recently replaced by George G. Meade. As fighting raged in the Wheatfield and Devil's Den, brigade commander Col. Strong Vincent had a precarious hold on Little Round Top, an important hill at the extreme left of the Union line. His brigade of four relatively small regiments was able to resist repeated assaults by Brig. Gen. Evander M. Law's brigade of Hood's division. The defense of Little Round Top with a bayonet charge by the 20th Maine was one of the most fabled episodes in the Civil War.

==== Charging Little Round Top dispute ====
There has been some controversy tied to the charge on Little Round Top with historians challenging who exactly led the charge. A certain faction of historians agree that it was Joshua Chamberlain who conceived of a charge while others argue that Melcher physically engaged first. Chamberlain referred to the controversy as "The Melcher incident". This was later confirmed by Brigadier General Ellis Spear, as he stated that Melcher initiated the charge by ordering the remains of his company to move forward a few steps to cover and protect fallen comrades in front of them on top of the hill. Spear concluded prior to the order of Chamberlain to fix bayonets, Melcher "led the impulsive charge, responding to the cries of wounded comrades between the lines." The key source for this conclusion, however, is a quote from a book, written in 1882, by a private in the regiment who was not present at the battle. Private Theodore Gerrish of the 20th Maine Regiment commented on the dispute with the following:

With a cheer and a flash of his sword that sent an inspiration along the line, full ten paces to the front he sprang – ten paces – more than half the distance between the hostile lines... 'Come on! Come on! Come on boys!' [Melcher] shouts. The color sergeant and the brave color guard follow, and with one wild yell of anguish wrung from its tortured heart the regiment charged.

Gerrish was joined by Chamberlain who similarly stated:

I went for the Color then at the angle in our center and the Color bearer was beside me advancing when Lieut. Melcher came dashing in and right up to my side. I was then in front of the commanding officer of the advancing front line of rebels. He fired one shot of his pistol at me and I raised my saber to give him the point when he handed me his sword and pistol both at once and called out "we surrender."

Chamberlain was very complimentary of Melcher's role in the charge, even crediting him with saving his life, though not specifically with leading the charge.

I think it was the sight of Melcher and his squad coming down like Tigers that both made him quit firing on me and surrender. Had not Melcher come on I think this officer would have shot me (4 barrels were loaded when I took his pistol) and very likely his men would have got such headway they might have swept us all back.

=== Later war service ===
During the Battle of the Wilderness, near the Confederate capital of Richmond, Virginia, Lt. Melcher lead a small company of seventeen men through a forest needed for alignment with the adjoining company. Due to the heavy fog and subsequent lack of vision, they failed to notice Confederate soldiers move up to their left flank and were surrounded. He ordered his men to lay on the ground and start shooting, capturing thirty confederates while sustaining only minor injuries. Three days later he was shot in the right leg following a counter-attack, during the Battle of Laurel Hill, in Spotsylvania, Virginia. He was rushed to a makeshift hospital in the Mary Washington house. Due to the level of injury sustained he was escorted to Armory Square hospital in Washington, and returned to Maine for recuperation. He returned to active duty in the fall of 1864.

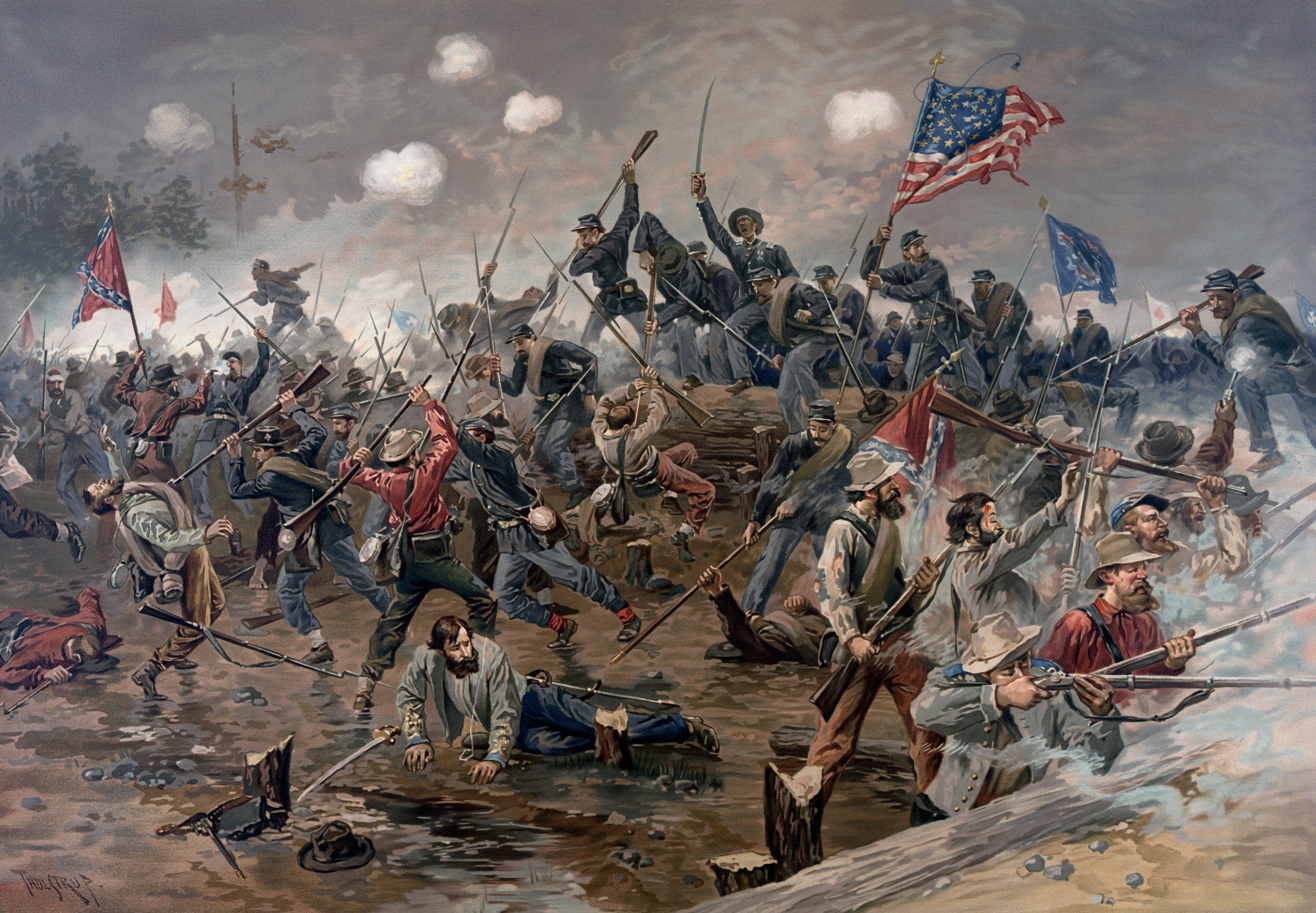
The Battle of Spotsylvania, where Melcher was severely injured

His involvement in the Battle of Spotsylvania Court House in Virginia resulted in him being promoted and serious injury. While engaging in battle he was promoted three different times; to first lieutenant in 1863, to Captain a year later, and near the conclusion of the battle he was brevetted Major. His commanding officers, impressed by him, promoted him to acting adjutant to Colonel Joshua Chamberlain. Serving under Ulysses S. Grant, and George G. Meade, he and his company were tasked with the advancement of soldiers to Laurel Hill, a position that was blocking them from Spotsylvania Court House. Confederate soldiers returned heavy fire and the initial program was unsuccessful in dislodging the Confederates. Melcher ordered a clearing of the Brock Road for the infantry, but the troopers soon bogged down, and provided a weak defense against the confederates at that point.

Our whole Division of over 10,000 strong is camped in a beautiful green field . . . The thousands of white tents dotting this green surface, and the many wagons, and ambulances, which go with the marching column makes a really grand sight. And the bands have been playing all evening, making music sweet and soul-stirring, which floats forth in the pleasant evening air . . . But I am moved when I think that before another evening, this beautiful scene will be stained in the blood of thousands who are to-night happy actors in it.

– Holman Melcher

Eventually, Melcher was brevetted to the rank of major by the end of the battle. He was badly wounded in the Battle of Spotsylvania Court House in Virginia, but survived. He served in three different companies during the war and served as Inspector-General on the division staff under Griffin and Chamberlain. Melcher was mustered out on July 16, 1865.

== Post-war service ==
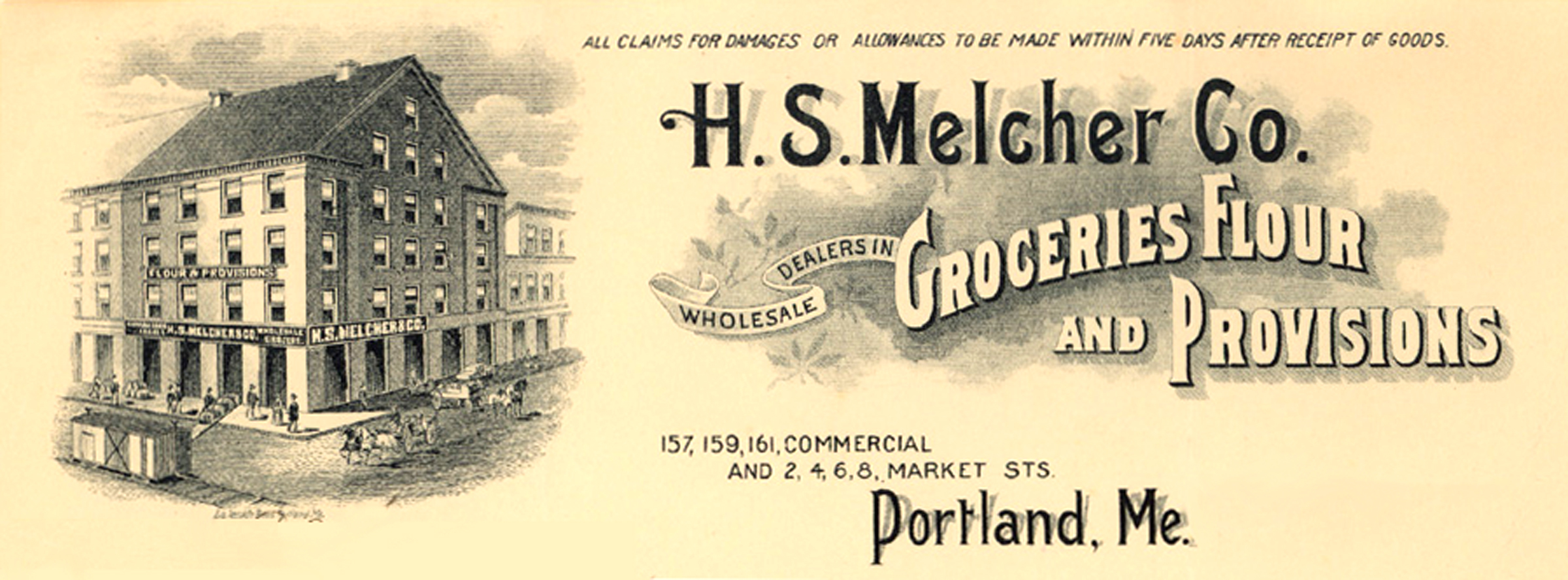
Letterhead for H. S. Melcher Co.

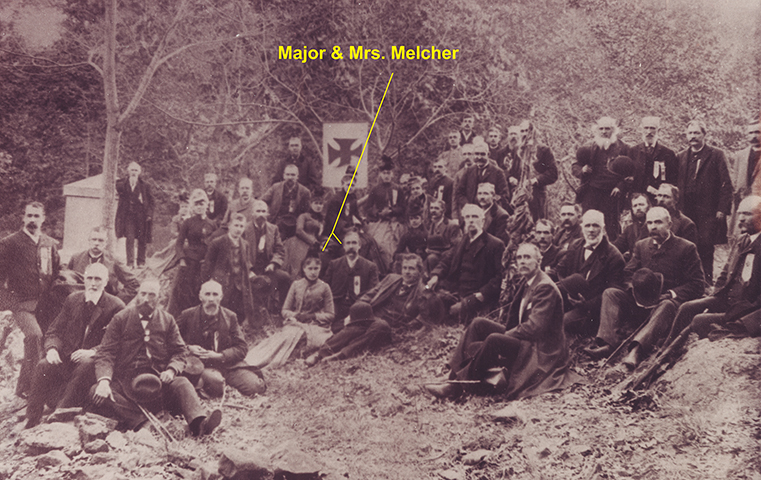
The 20th Maine Regimental Association at Gettysburg in October 1889.

In his postwar years, Melcher put the wartime skills he obtained working as adjutant for Maine Generals O.O. Howard and J.L. Chamberlain to good use. He founded and operated the H.S. Melcher Company, a wholesale produce business on Fore Street along the waterfront in Portland, Maine. After many years he sold it for a handsome profit to what became the A&P grocery chain. His business success garnered him wide support and respect. His old commanding officer, Col. Chamberlain, wrote to the advertisement board of the city and published the following:

I want to propose a name for the Republican nomination for mayor-- a name that needs no recommendation; a man with a record of splendid courage and endurance in the late war, from the beginning to the end since the war an honorable, high-minded citizen and energetic businessman, enjoying the confidence and respect of his fellow citizens in both parties. From this man no pledges need or will be asked. All these years of his well-regarded life are pledges for his good conduct in any situation. And his name is Holman S. Melcher.

– Joshua Chamberlain, Union Army General

Melcher was elected to Mayor of Portland on January 1, 1889, and a year later married Ellen M. McClellan who was the daughter of George McClellan, a prominent Portland lawyer. He was elected as a Republican and advocated for progressive values and the establishment of a central-city government. His first wife, Ellen died from consumption, and he later remarried with Alice Hart.

He was elected again and served for a second term ending in 1895. As Mayor, he remained committed to the progression of Veteran Affairs and founded the 20th Maine Regiment Association (1876 – 1905), where he served as president. He published an article titled An Experience in the Battle of the Wilderness in the Maine MOLLUS's War Papers Vol. 1 (1898), based on his own experiences in that battle.

== Death and legacy ==
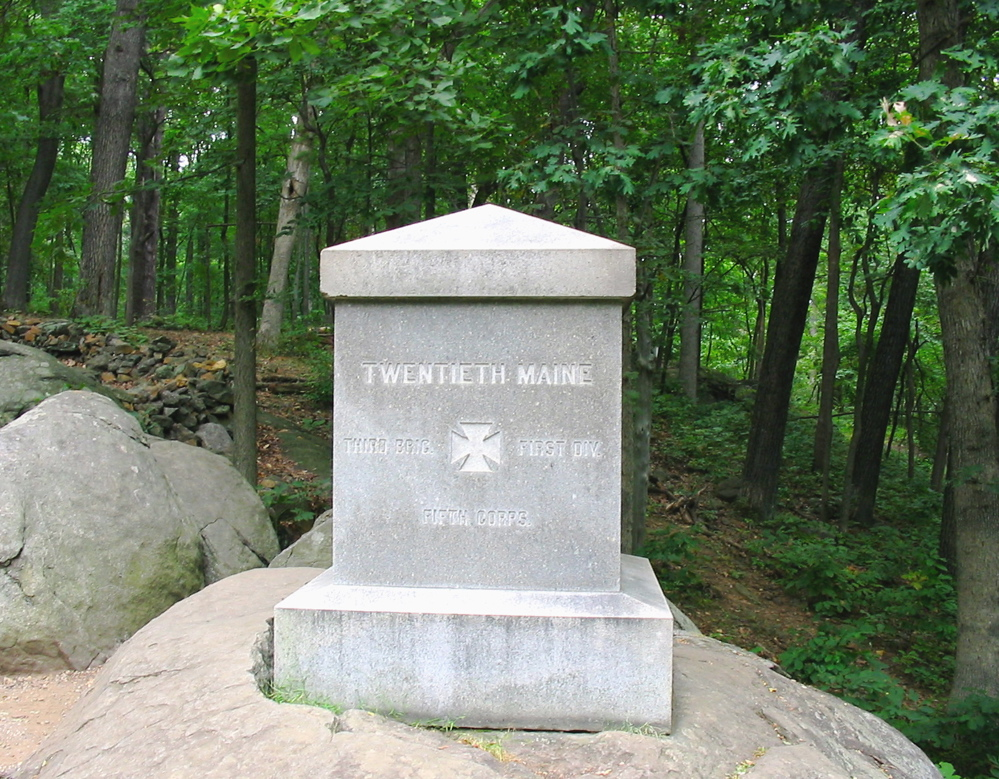
Regimental monument on Little Round Top for the 20th Maine.

Melcher suffered from poor health toward the end of his life due to the pain from his old war wounds. He eventually died after a long fight with Bright's Disease, and died on June 25, 1905, at age 64. He is buried in Evergreen Cemetery in Portland, Maine. His brother, Nathaniel died in 1902. Melcher and Alice Hart had one daughter, Georgiana Hill, who married Harry Tukey Johnson. Hart outlived Melcher by 18 years.

Most of Melcher's papers are currently stored at the Maine Historical Society, Bates College, and Bowdoin College. Melcher's writings, along with correspondence from other members of the 20th Maine were published in With a Flash of His Sword: The Writings of. Maj. Holman S. Melcher, 20th Maine Infantry. Melcher's house in Portland survives at 84 Pine Street.

== See also ==
- Little Round Top
- Battle of Spotsylvania Court House
- Portland, Maine
- History of Bates College
- Maine Historical Society

== Bibliography ==
- Styple, William B. (Ed.), With a Flash of his Sword: The Writings of. Maj. Holman S. Melcher, 20th Maine Infantry, Belle Grove Publishing, 1994, ISBN 1-883926-00-9.
- Desjardin, Thomas A., Stand Firm Ye Boys from Maine: The 20th Maine and the Gettysburg Campaign, Thomas Publications, 1995, ISBN 1-57747-034-6.
- Donald, David Herbert (1996) [1995]. Lincoln. Simon and Schuster.
