= Moses Cheney =

American abolitionist (1793–1875)

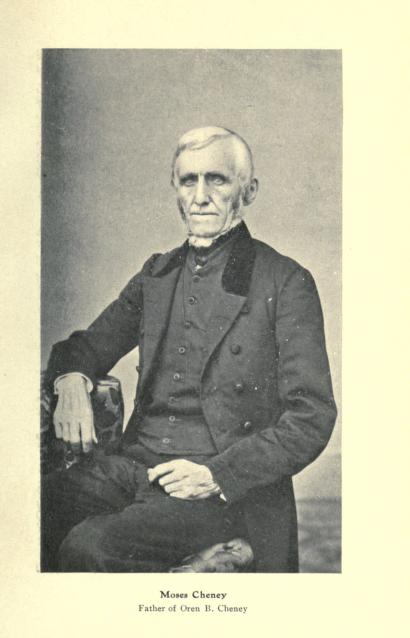
Moses Cheney

Moses Cheney (January 31, 1793 – July 17, 1875) was an American abolitionist, printer and legislator from New Hampshire.

Cheney was born in 1793 in Thornton, New Hampshire. Cheney entered the paper printing business in a region of nearby Holderness which was later renamed Ashland. On June 23, 1816, he married Abigail Morrison (1796-1881). Moses Cheney served as a conductor on the Underground Railroad at their home in Peterborough where they hosted Frederick Douglass on several occasions. Cheney was also the original printer of The Morning Star, an abolitionist Freewill Baptist newspaper.

The Cheneys' son Oren Cheney was the founder and first president of Bates College in Maine. Their son Person Cheney served as a U.S. Senator and Governor of New Hampshire.

Moses Cheney died on July 17, 1875, and was buried in Ashland.
