= History of Bates College =

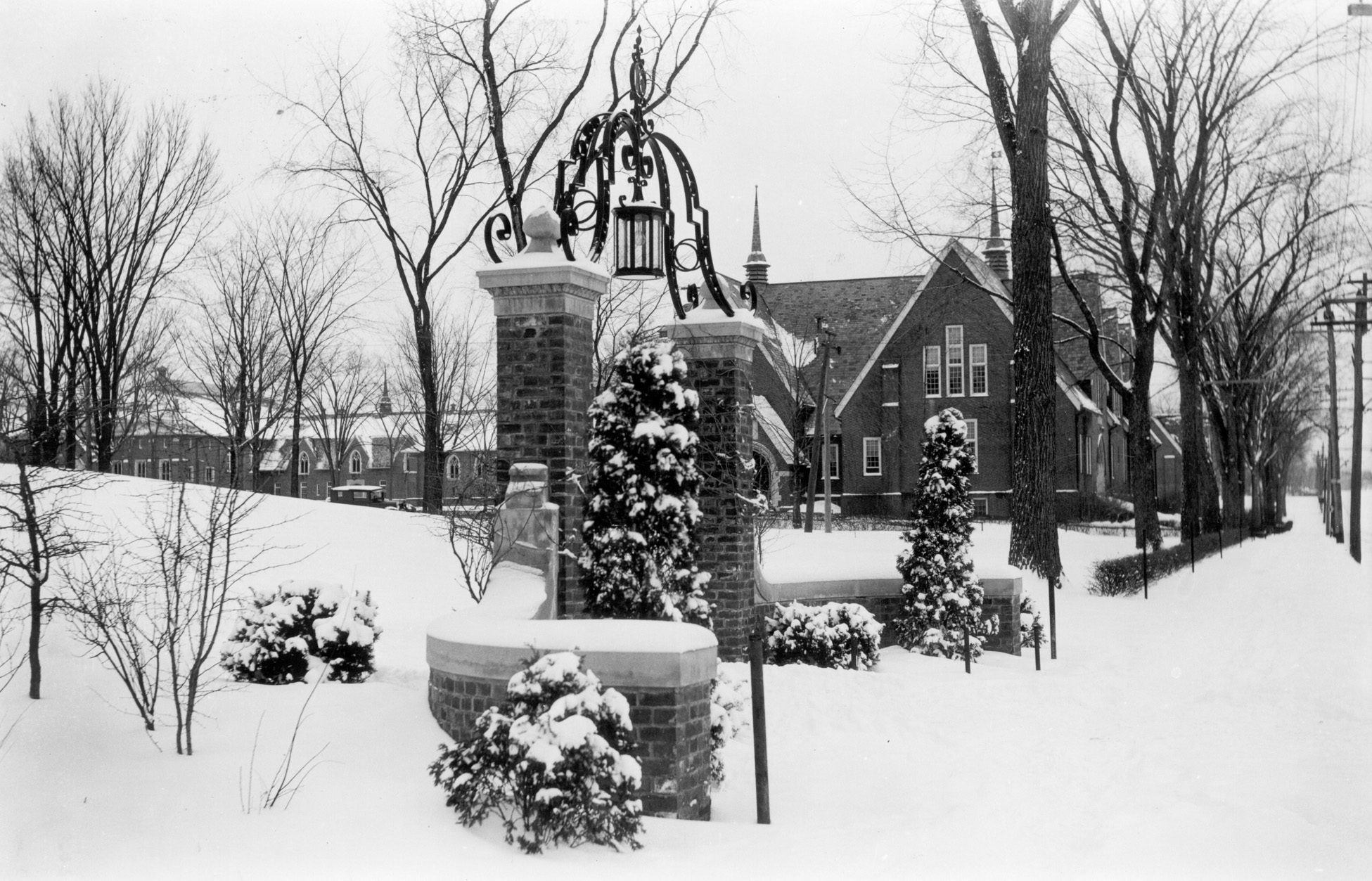
The college's historic garnet gateways, 1906, after snowfall, enclosing its early campus.

The history of Bates College began shortly its founding on March 16, 1855, in Lewiston, Maine. The college was founded by American politician Oren Burbank Cheney and American businessman Benjamin Bates. The Maine State Legislature established its predecessor as the Maine State Seminary, the first coeducational college in New England. The seminary was renamed to Bates College in 1863. The Cobb Divinity School and the Nichols Latin School became affiliated with the college in 1866. The first women to graduate from a New England college was Mary Mitchell Birchall. Gridley J. F. Bryant constructed the college's first buildings, Hathorn Hall and Parker Hall.

The college went on to send one hundred and seventy-five students to the war, most famously Holman Melcher, Aaron Daggett, and James Porter. After the war, George Colby Chase became the first and only alumnus-president; he went on to establish the Outing Club and the Brooks Quimby Debate Council. In 1943, the V-12 Navy College Training Program was established seeing the enrollment of Robert F. Kennedy and the naming of the S.S. Bates Victory. From the 1970s to 1990s, the college secularized and built 22 new academic, residential and athletic facilities. Since the start of the 21st century, Bates history has been marked by financial growth, technological advancement, and increasing socioeconomic equality.

== 19th century ==
=== Maine State Seminary ===
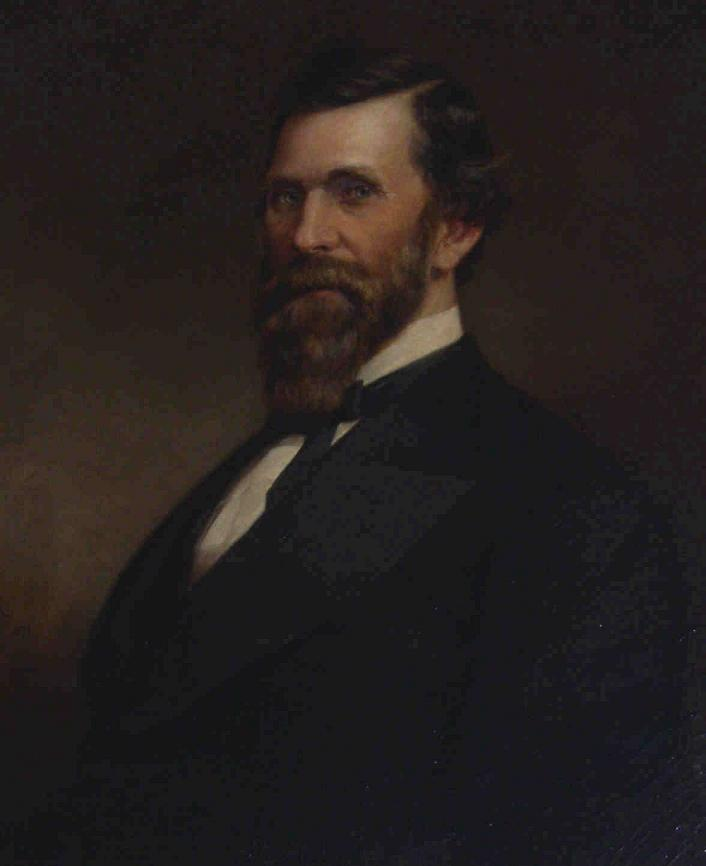
Governor of New Hampshire, brother of Oren Burbank Cheney, and early trustee of the college, Person Colby Cheney.

The Maine State Seminary was founded with liberal arts academics in 1855, making it one of the oldest liberal arts colleges in the United States. Its founding made it the oldest coeducational college in the New England. Cheney met with religious and political leaders in Topsham, Maine, to discuss the formation of a school that catered to Free Will Baptists and was based on principles of egalitarianism, liberty, and scholarship. He began his speech by stating:

We do not propose an Academy [referring to Colby College (then Waterville Academy)], but a school of higher order, between a college [referring to Bowdoin College] and an Academy.

The speech was well received and of the one required, twenty-four petitions were submitted to the Maine State Legislature. After minimal delay the charter was approved and appropriated with $15,000 for its conception. With Cheney's influence in the legislature, the Maine State Seminary was chartered on March 16, 1855. The campus ran parallel to Frye Street, an area that was part of an affluent residential district of Lewiston. Soon after establishment multiple donors, including members of the Boston elite, stepped forward to finance portions of the school, such as Seth Hathorn, who donated the first library and academic building, which was renamed Hathorn Hall.

==== Benjamin Bates ====
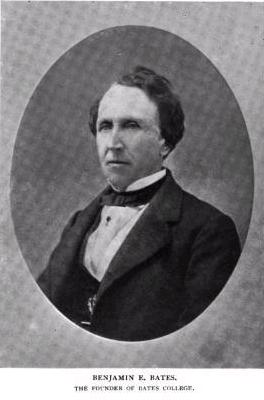
Benjamin Bates

Cheney's impact in Maine was noted by Boston business magnate Benjamin Bates who developed an interest in the college. Bates gave $100,000 in personal donations and overall contributions valued at $250,000 to the college. Benjamin Bates suggested to Cheney that the school be located in a more central part of Maine. At the time, Lewiston, Maine was one of the most profitable towns in the state and produced large amounts capital for the state and businesses. The school was renamed Bates College in his honor on 1863 and was chartered the following year on March 16.

==== Gaining academic reputation ====
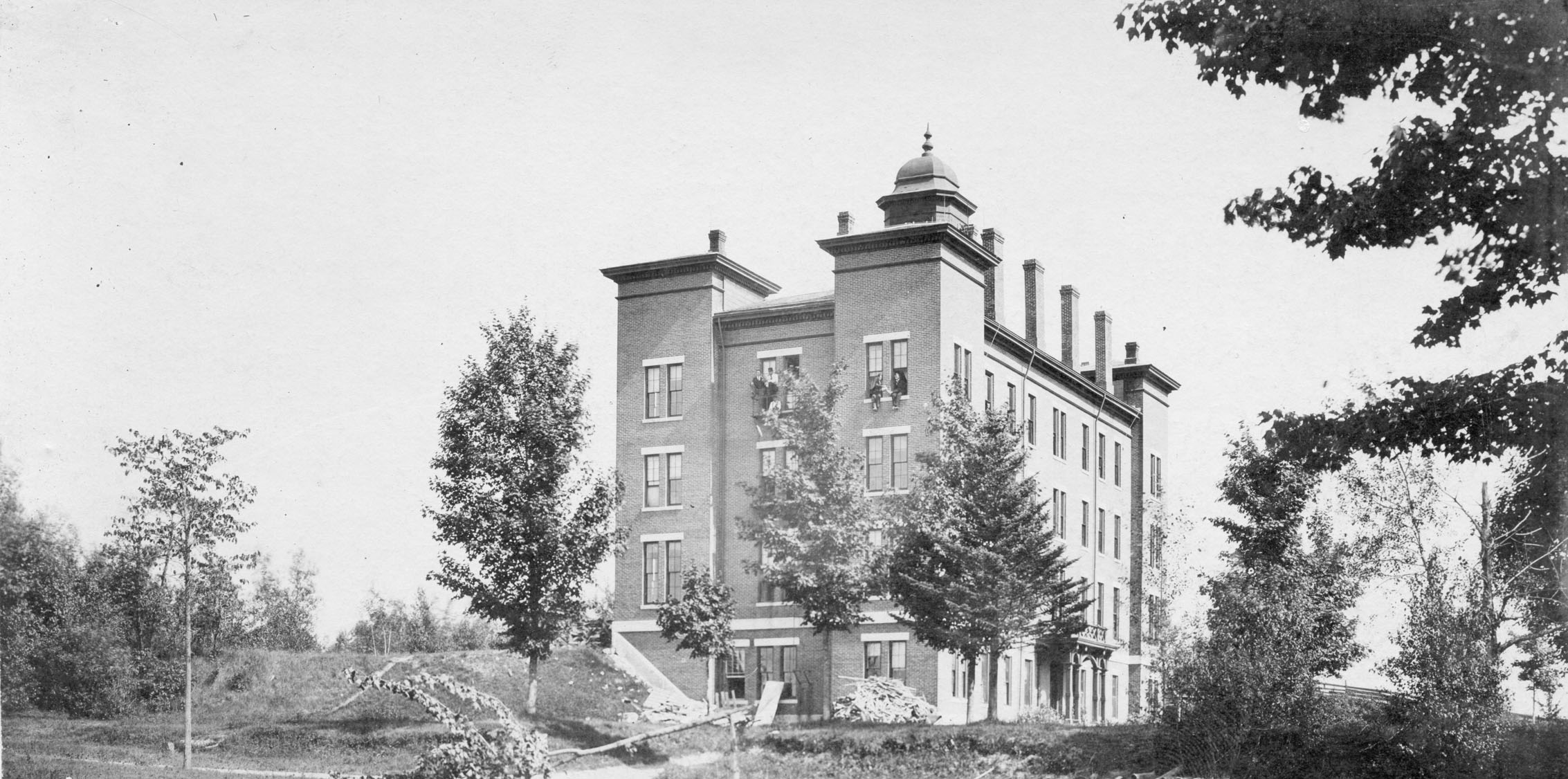
The Nichols Latin School was a private prep school in the late 19th century, occupying what is now John Bertram Hall.

In 1862, the college graduated Frank Haven Hall, who would later revolutionize modern day computing and typography. Three years later, the college would enroll the first woman to receive a college degree in New England, Mary Mitchel. A small gymnasium was built to house meetings and special sporting events in 1867. One year later as the student body grew, John Bertram Hall was constructed, originally called Lyman Nichols Hall, founder of Lewiston, but renamed to remember John Bertram, a naval captain and donor to the college.

Bates had a reputation for academic rigor and social inclusion and it primarily educated the middle and working classes from Maine. The school gained academic prominence through its intellectual focus, including maintaining three literary societies: the Literary Fraternity, Philomathean Society and Ladies' Athenaeum. The seal of the college features a stag deer resting near a pine tree, left of a single of grain, a lighted oil lamp, and an open book.

The Cobb Divinity School became affiliated with the college in 1866. Four years later in 1870, Bates sponsored a college preparatory school, called the Nichols Latin School. The college began instruction with a six-person faculty tasked with the teaching of moral philosophy and the classics. From its inception, Bates served as an alternative to a more traditional and historically conservative Bowdoin College. There is a long tradition of rivalry and competitiveness between the two colleges, revolving around socioeconomic class, academic quality, and collegiate athletics.

=== American Civil War ===
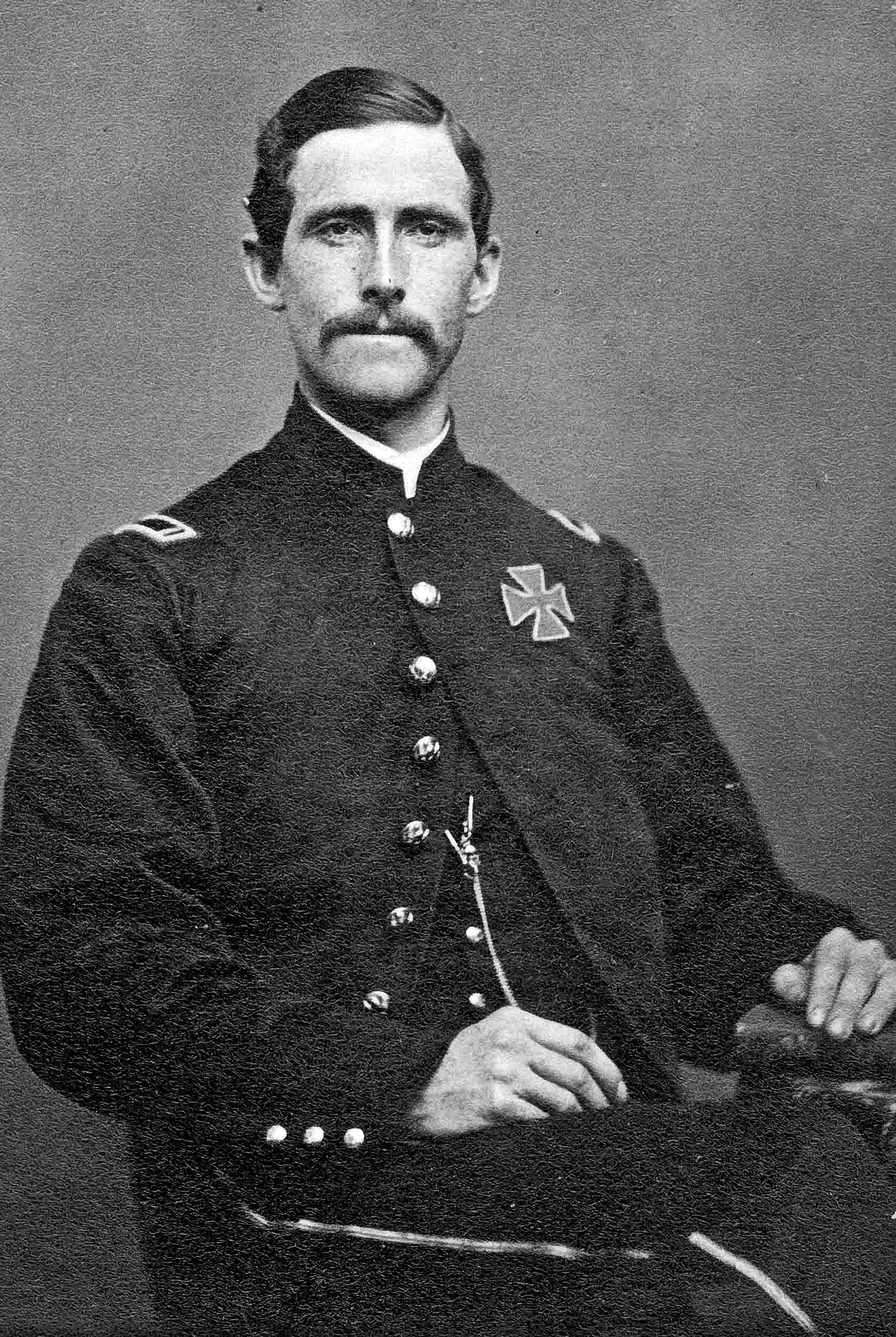
Brevet Major Holman Melcher, class of 1862

During the American Civil War, Bates played an important role in advocating for the rights of African Americans. The college went on to send one hundred and seventy-five students to the war. One such student was Major Holman Melcher, who enlisted in the 20th Regiment of Maine. He was the first person to charge down Little Round Top. The college would also go onto graduate the last surviving Union general of the American Civil War, Aaron Daggett, and James Porter, one of General Custer's eleven officers killed at the Battle of Little Bighorn. A total of three Bates alumni received the nation's highest military medal, the Medal of Honor. The college's first African American student, Henry Chandler, graduated in 1874. In 1884, the college graduated the first woman to argue in front of the U.S. Supreme Court, Ella Haskell. In 1894, George Colby Chase led Bates to increased national recognition, and the college graduated one of the founding members of the Boston Red Sox, Harry Lord.

== 20th century ==
=== 1900–1920: Brooks Quimby Debate Council and the outing club ===
During the Chase presidency, the college's debate team, which dates to the beginning of the school, became intercollegiate and associated with the college's academic reputation. In 1920, the Bates Outing Club was founded and is one of the oldest collegiate outing clubs in the country, being the first at a private college to include both men and women from inception. The debate society, the Brooks Quimby Debate Council, became the first college debate team in the U.S. to compete internationally. In February 1920, the debate team defeated Harvard College during the national debate tournament held at Lewiston City Hall. After this, Bates was established as a dominant force in collegiate debate.

In 1921, the college's debate team participated in the first intercontinental collegiate debate in history against the Oxford Union's debate team at the University of Oxford. In 1922, The New York Times called Bates "the power centre of college debating in America." Oxford's first debate in the U.S. was against Bates in Lewiston, Maine, in September 1923.

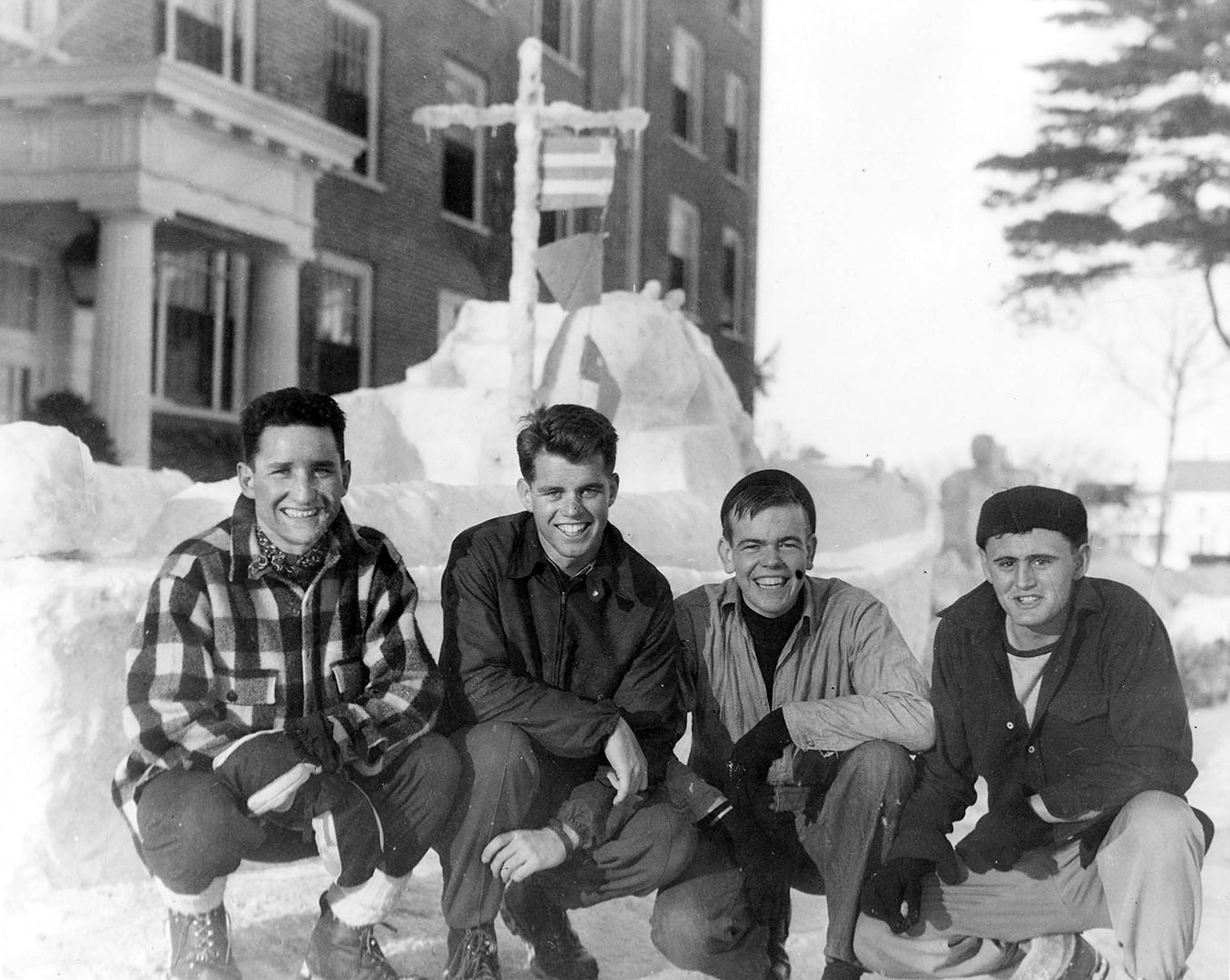
Kennedy (2nd from left) during Winter Carnival at Bates, 1944

=== 1940–1960: V-12, RFK, and CBB ===
During 1943, the V-12 Navy College Training Program was introduced at Bates. Bates maintained a considerable female student body and "did not suffer [lack in student enrollment due to military service involvement]." During the war, a naval ship was named the SS Bates Victory, after the college. It was during this time that future U.S. Attorney General Robert F. Kennedy enrolled along with hundreds of other sailor-students.

The college began to compete athletically with Colby College, and in 1964, with Bowdoin created the Colby-Bates-Bowdoin Consortium. Reynolds began the Chase Regatta in 1988, which features the President's Cup that is contested by Bates, Colby, and Bowdoin annually. All three of the schools compete in the New England Small College Athletic Conference (NESCAC) and share one of the ten oldest football rivalries in the United States.

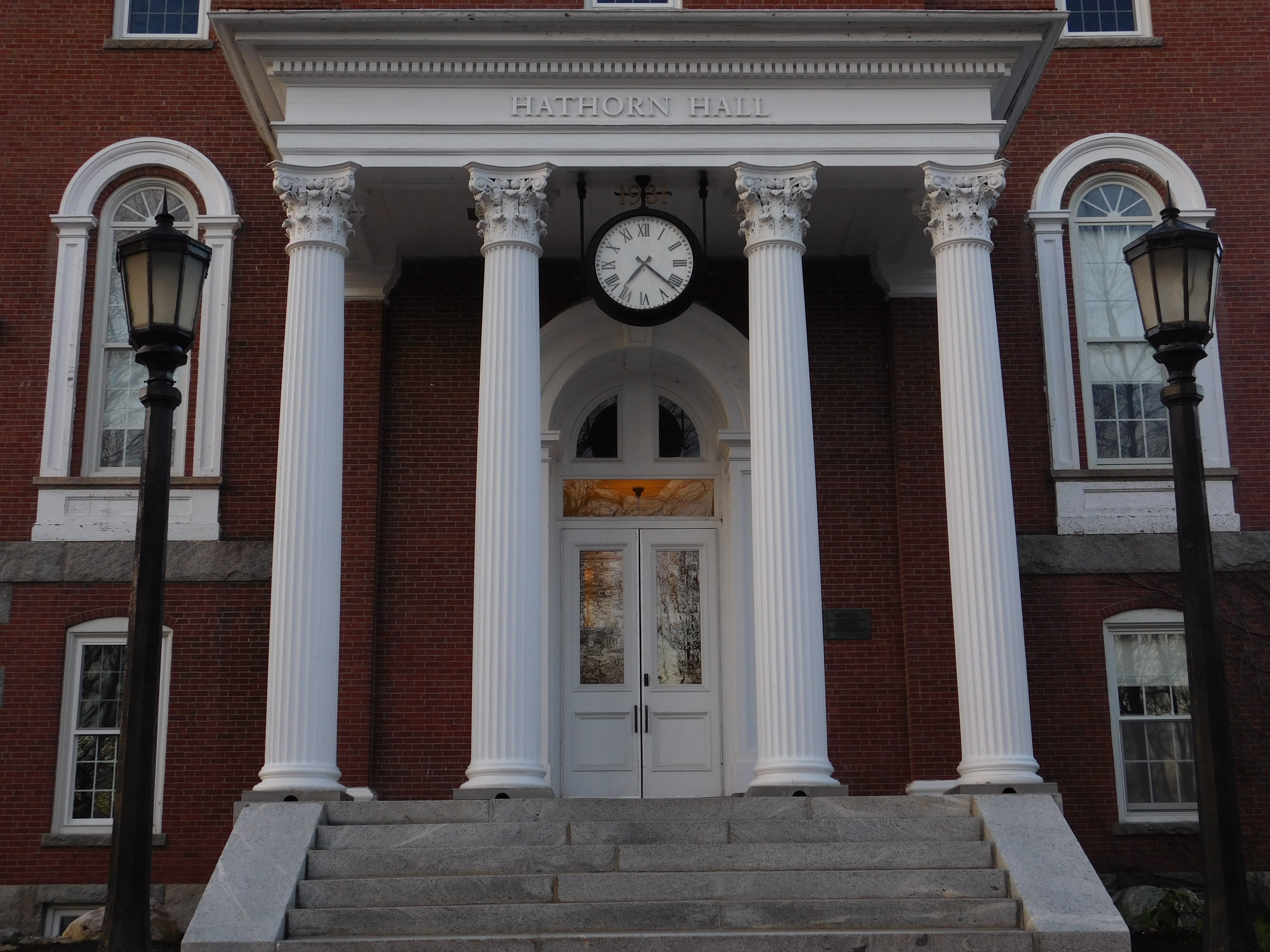
Hathorn Hall, designed by Gridley J.F. Bryant, in 1857.

=== 1970–1990s: secularization and campus growth ===
In 1967, President Thomas Hedley Reynolds promoted the idea of teacher-scholars at Bates and secured the construction of numerous academic and recreational buildings. Reynolds was integral to the acquisition of the Bates-Morse Mountain. Under Reynolds, Bates ceased being identified with any particular religion. In 1984, Bates became one of the first liberal arts colleges to make the SAT and ACT optional in the admission process. In 1989, Donald West Harward became president of Bates and greatly expanded the college's overall infrastructure by building 22 new academic, residential and athletic facilities, including Pettengill Hall, the Residential Village, and the Coastal Center at Shortridge.

== 21st century ==
=== 2002–2012: campus expansion ===
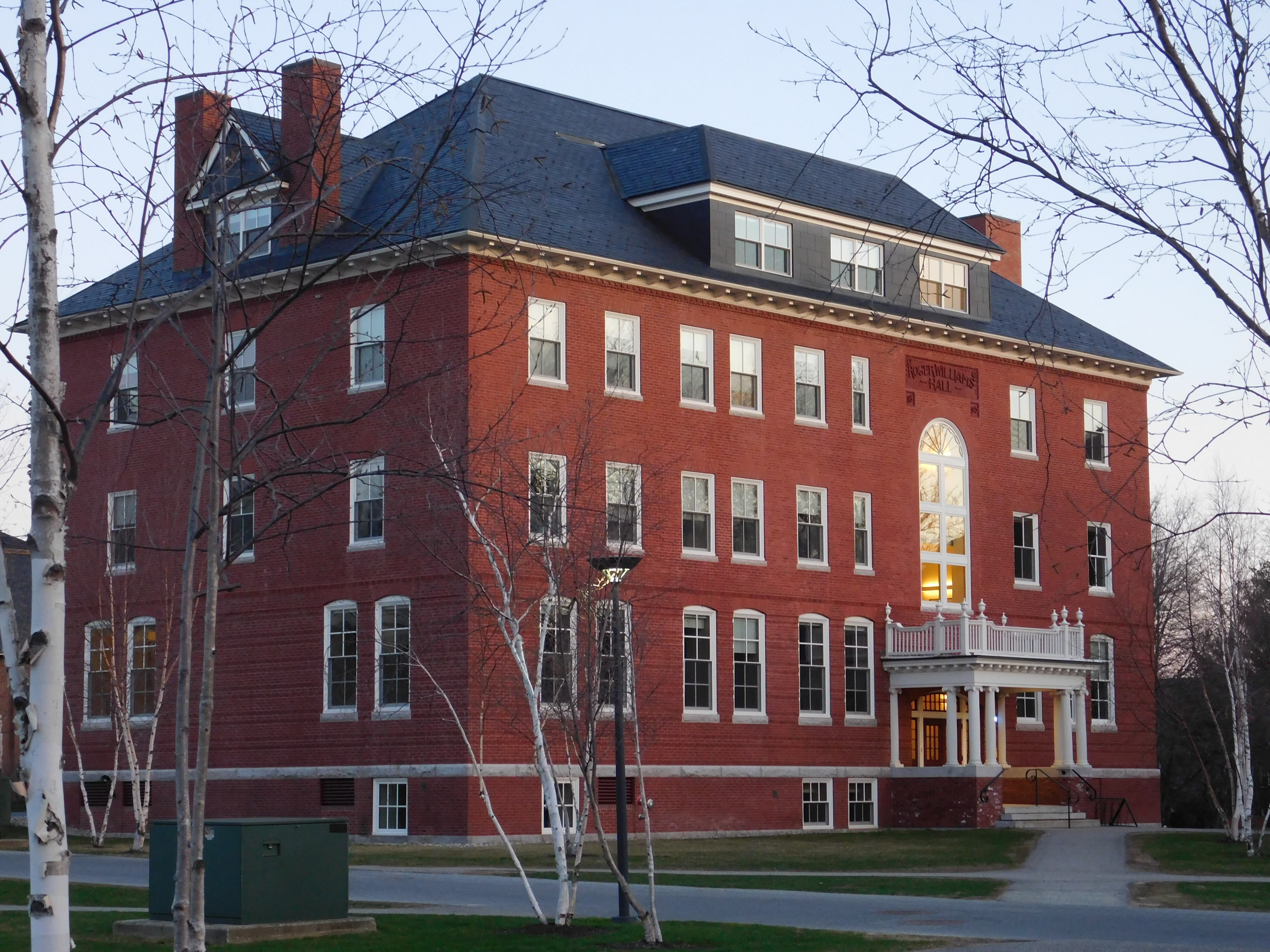
Roger Williams Hall was built in 1894, named after Roger Williams, set in the rural quad of Bates.

Elaine Tuttle Hansen was installed as the seventh and first female president of Bates College on October 26, 2002, in Lewiston, Maine. Hansen released an internal memo to the Bates community in late March 2003 regarding the U.S. invasion or Iraq, noting the campus protests condemning the armed conflict. In 2005, May 2, was dubbed "Bates College Day" by Governor of Maine, John Baldacci. In late 2007, Hansen announced the construction of 280 Hall, a new residence hall for 150 students at the foot of Mount David. In April 2008, expanded the campus by completing the construction of "The Commons" dining hall at a cost of approximately $24 million. Bates released a memo outlining fiscal year losses due to the 2008 financial crisis and the Great Recession, noting a 31% market value loss. Bates appointed Nancy J. Cable as interim president, to serve through June 30, 2012.

=== 2012–2023: Spencer era ===
It was announced soon after that the Vice President of Institutional Policy of Harvard University, Clayton Spencer was to be appointed as Hansen's successor. On Friday, Oct. 26, 2012, Spencer assumed the presidency. In February 2016, a gift of $19 million was given to Bates in support of the new academic programs. 1980 alumnus, Michael Bonney and his wife, Alison Grott Bonney gave $10 million, the largest donation by a single party in the history of Bates.

Bates announced the development new areas of study, including a new program resolving around Computer Programing called Computational and Digital Studies. In May 2017, Spencer launched a large-scale fundraising campaign – the largest ever undertaken by the college – totaling $300 million to fund facilities, financial aid, the operational fund, and the endowment. The campaign was met with a $50 million donation by Bonney.

=== 2023–present ===
Legal scholar Garry Jenkins was appointed president in 2023, becoming the first black president of Bates.

== Social class and elitism ==
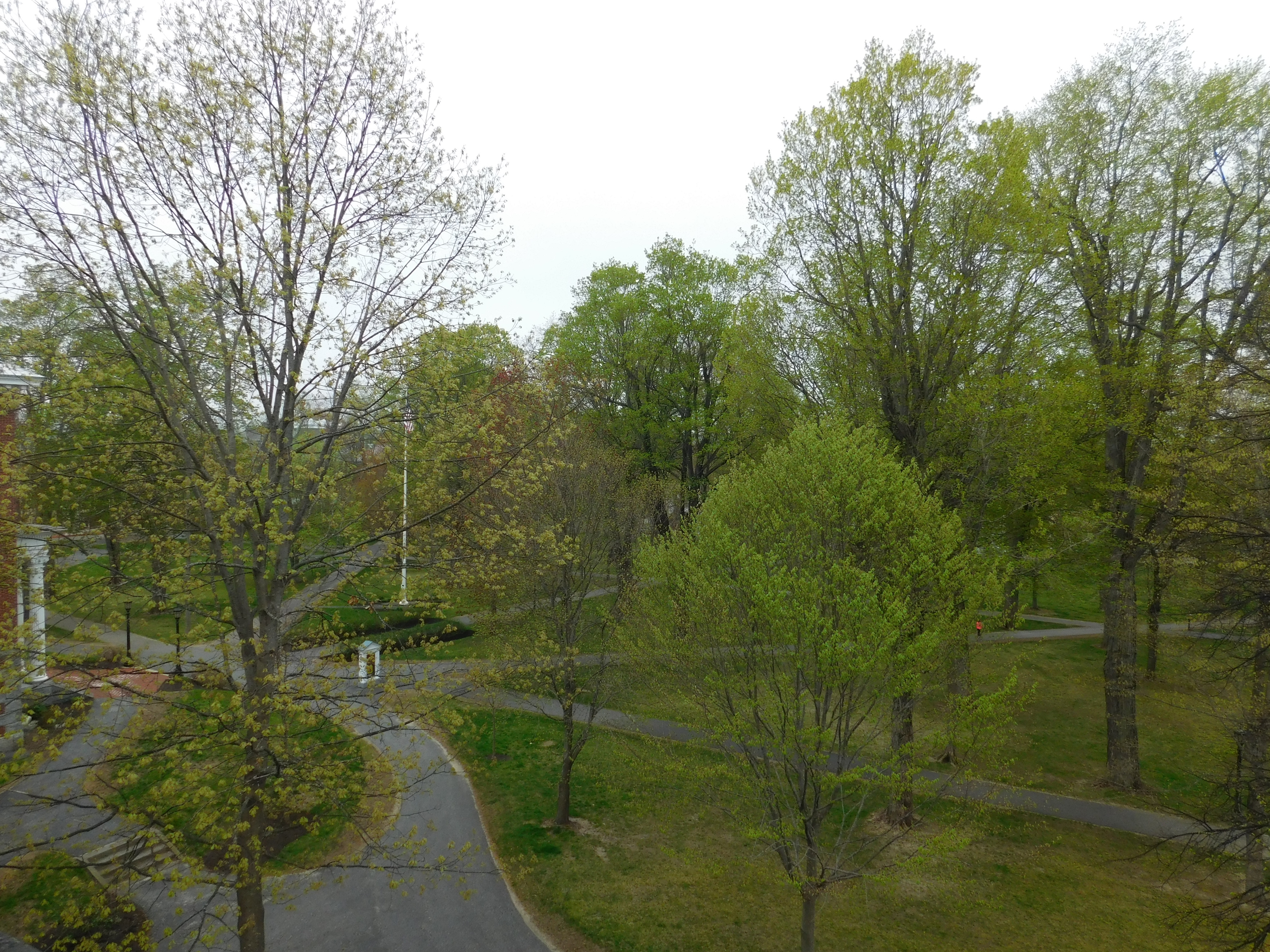
The college was called a "leafy oasis of privilege" by Lewiston locals in the 1960s.

The college's early egalitarian policies were not universally popular, and some of the college's early faculty and students voiced concern over Bates' prestige when the first black and female students arrived in the 1850s and 1860s. The college, under the direction of Cheney, also rejected fraternities and sororities in its original charter on grounds of unwarranted exclusivity incompatible with the Free Will Baptist outlook. Bates students attempted to establish secret societies in 1881 and the issue was debated in the Bates Student in the late 19th century. In February 1920 during Prohibition, students again attempted unsuccessfully to form a secret society when the first meeting of the "Cognac Club, Bates' only secret society" at that time, was held. Select students at the college "desired more aristocratic company" similar to that of Bowdoin College and other peer schools.

Although the egalitarian reputation held during the late 1800s and early 1900s, by World War II, some people claimed the school's reputation was often elitist like other similar schools. During the late 1940s, Bates earned a reputation for predominately educating white students who come from upper-middle-class to affluent backgrounds. In the 1950s the college fenced off the campus in an attempt to "represent boundaries between Bates and Lewiston." The New York Times detailed the atmosphere of the college in the 1960s with the following:

The prestigious Bates College — named for Benjamin Bates, whose riverfront mill on Canal Street in Lewiston was once Maine’s largest employer — provided an antithesis: a leafy oasis of privilege. In the 1960s, it was really difficult for most Bates students to integrate in the community because most of the people spoke French and lived a hard life.

The Bates Student published an article entitled "Debunking the Middle Class Myth", detailing how low income students are “the largest and least visible minorities” at the college and often feel isolated by their more wealthier peers. The college has come under criticism for lack of diversity and socioeconomic homogeneity. On April 13, 1994, students protested the Dean of Admissions Office because 90% of the student populate was white and the office made no attempt to rectify the situation. A Chronicle of Higher Education article quoted a student as saying "It's preposterous that a school of this elite stature should have so few minorities."

Minorities at the college, typically classified as non-white and low income students, have noted selected practices and experiences at the college, such as: lack of safe spaces, insensitive professors, tokenism, financial insecurity, indirect racism and social elitism. In 2011, the college received widespread media coverage being the most expensive college in the United States. According to a 2017 article on income inequality by The New York Times, 18% of Bates students came from the 1% of the American upper class (families who made about $525,000 or more per year), with "median family income[s] of student[s] at $226,500." 76% of students at Bates comes from the top 20 percent. In January 2017, the college was reported to be the most expensive college in Maine.

== See also ==
- Bates College traditions
- List of Bates College People
