= Person Colby Cheney =

American politician (1828–1901)

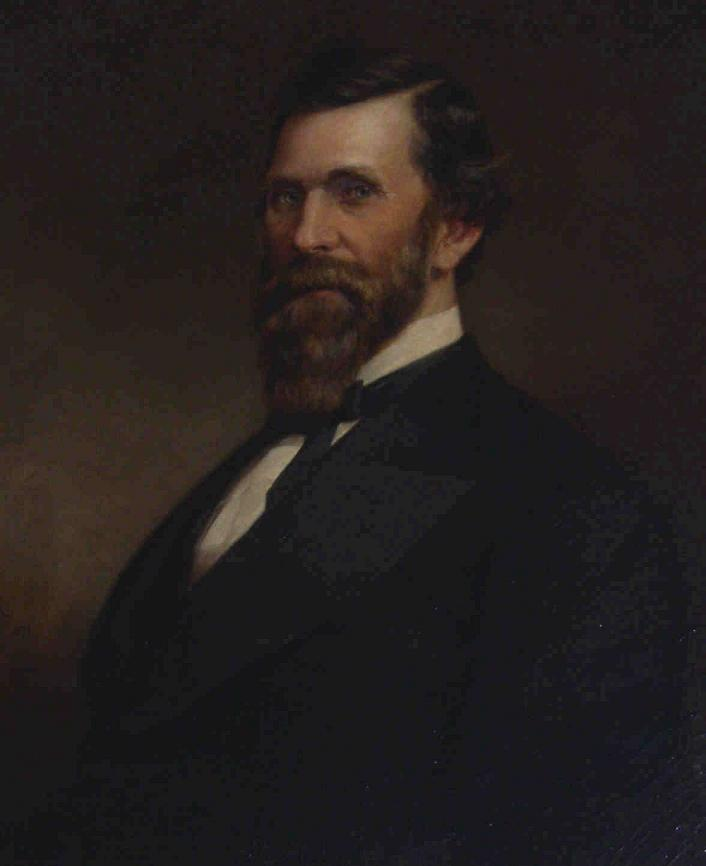

35th Governor of New Hampshire
- In office June 10, 1875 – June 7, 1877
- Preceded by: James A. Weston
- Succeeded by: Benjamin F. Prescott

United States Senator from New Hampshire
- In office November 24, 1886 – June 14, 1887
- Appointed by: Moody Currier
- Preceded by: Austin F. Pike
- Succeeded by: William E. Chandler

19th Mayor of Manchester, New Hampshire
- In office 1872–1872
- Preceded by: James A. Weston
- Succeeded by: Charles H. Bartlett

Member of the New Hampshire House of Representatives
- In office 1854

Personal details
- Born: February 25, 1828 Holderness, New Hampshire, U.S. (now Ashland)
- Died: June 19, 1901 (aged 73) Dover, New Hampshire, U.S.
- Party: Republican

Person Colby Cheney (February 25, 1828 – June 19, 1901) was a paper manufacturer, abolitionist and Republican politician from Manchester, New Hampshire. He was the 35th governor of New Hampshire and later represented the state in the United States Senate.

== Biography ==
Cheney was born in Holderness, New Hampshire (now Ashland) to abolitionists, Abigail and Moses Cheney. Oren Burbank Cheney, the founder of Bates College, was Person Cheney's older brother. Cheney attended academies in Peterborough and Hancock and the Parsonsfield Seminary in Parsonsfield, Maine. He engaged in the manufacture of paper in Peterborough until 1866, and in 1854 was a member of the New Hampshire House of Representatives.

During the Civil War he was first lieutenant and regimental quartermaster in the Thirteenth Regiment of the New Hampshire Volunteer Infantry (1862–1863). He was state railroad commissioner from 1864 to 1867. He moved to Manchester in 1867, and engaged in business as a dealer in paper stock and continued the manufacture of paper at Goffstown.

=== Political career ===
He also engaged in agricultural pursuits until being elected mayor of Manchester in 1871. He was Governor of New Hampshire from 1875 to 1877. Cheney was appointed as a Republican to the United States Senate to fill the vacancy caused by the death of Austin F. Pike, and served from November 24, 1886, to June 14, 1887, when a successor was elected and qualified. He was not a candidate for election to fill the vacancy and resumed his former manufacturing pursuits.

Cheney served as Envoy Extraordinary and Minister Plenipotentiary to Switzerland in 1892–1893. He died in Dover, New Hampshire in 1901 and is buried in the Pine Grove Cemetery at Manchester.

Party political offices
Preceded by Luther McCutchins	Republican nominee for Governor of New Hampshire; 1875, 1876	Succeeded by Benjamin F. Prescott
Political offices
Preceded by James A. Weston	Mayor of Manchester, New Hampshire; 1872–1872	Succeeded by Charles H. Bartlett
Preceded by James A. Weston	Governor of New Hampshire; 1875–1877	Succeeded by Benjamin F. Prescott
U.S. Senate
Preceded by Austin F. Pike	U.S. senator (Class 2) from New Hampshire; 1886–1887; Served alongside: Henry W. Blair	Succeeded by William E. Chandler
