= Historic Quad =

Coordinates: 44.105717°N 70.205121°W

- Historic Quadrangle
- U.S. National Register of Historic Places
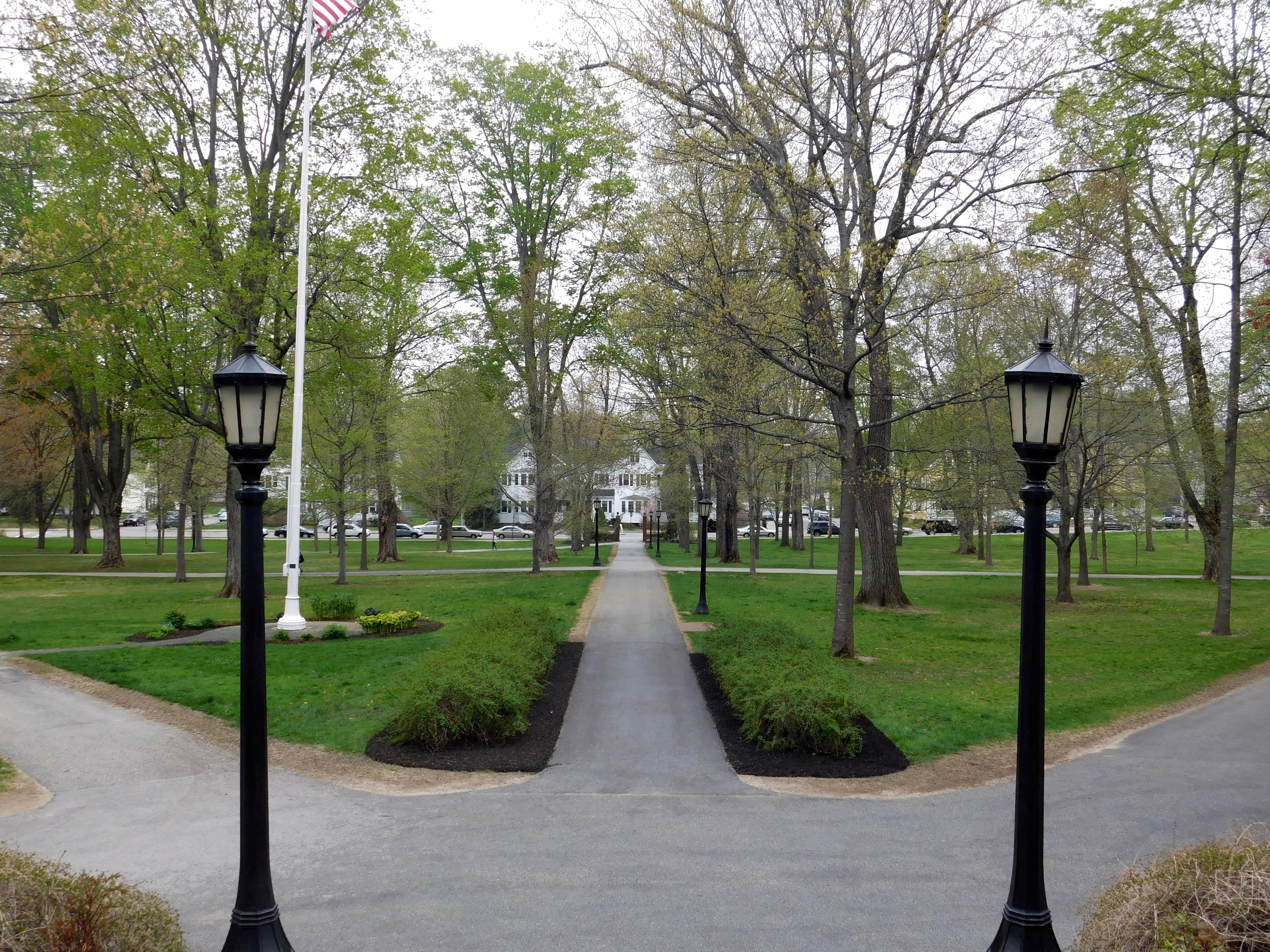
- View of the quad from Hathorn Hall

- Location within Maine
- Location: Lewiston, Maine, U.S.
- Built: 1856
- Architect: Multiple
- Architectural style: Neoclassical, Federal, Colonial
- NRHP reference No.: 70000071
- Added to NRHP: February 6, 1970

Historic Quad, also known as the Historic Quadrangle, in Lewiston, Maine, is a grassy area of 22.4 acres (9.1 ha) enclosed by fences with five garnet gates. It is the oldest part of the Bates College campus, and serves as its historic center as well as the site of annual commencement exercises and other convocations. The area is surrounded by College Street, Campus Avenue, Central Avenue and Andrews Road. The centermost building on the Quad is Hathorn Hall, built in 1856 it was inducted into National Register of Historic Places in 1970. Hathorn is flanked by the oldest residential dorm at the college, Parker Hall (1856), and the second oldest natural science building Dana Chemistry Hall (1965) which is adjacent to Hedge Hall (1890) which is perpendicular to Coram Library (1902) and Carnegie Science Building (1913). Directly across the stairs of Hathorn is Lindholm House, which houses the admissions office.

== Features and surroundings ==
The quad is surrounded by numerous buildings and off campus houses such as: Rand Hall (1905) and the Gomes Chapel (1913), Parker Hall (1856), Hathorn Hall (1856), and Dana Chemistry Hall (1965), Coram Library (1902) and Carnegie Science Hall (1913), Lindholm House, Milliken House) (1902), and Whittier House (1902).
