= SS Bates Victory =

World War II Victory ship of the United States

History
- Name: Bates Victory (1945–50); Remsen Heights (1950–68); Eastern Star (1968–70); Philomila (1970–71)
- Builder: California Shipbuilding, Los Angeles
- Yard number: 787; MC hull #V71
- Laid down: 9 March 1945
- Launched: 2 May 1945
- Completed: 26 May 1945
- Identification: Official number: 247865
- Fate: Scrapped 1971

General characteristics
- Tonnage: 7,607 GRT, 10,850 DWT
- Length: 455 ft (138.7 m)
- Beam: 62 ft (18.9 m)
- Draft: 28 ft (8.5 m)
- Depth of hold: 38 ft (11.6 m)
- Propulsion: oil-fired boilers; steam engine; single screw
- Speed: 15–17 knots (28–31 km/h)

SS Bates Victory was a World War II Victory ship named after Bates College in Maine.

The ship was a standard Victory cargo type VC2-S-AP2 constructed by the California Shipbuilding Corporation, in Los Angeles for the United States Maritime Commission (MC).

== World War II ==
Her keel was laid down on March 9, 1945. She was launched and christened as Bates Victory in Los Angeles Harbor at midnight on May 2, 1945. The ship was completed and delivered to the War Shipping Administration (WSA) on May 26, 1945. The General Steamship Corporation operated the ship under agreement with WSA until July 3, 1946. At that time the wartime operating agreement with General Steamship was changed to a bareboat charter to American Export Lines, first by WSA and when that organization was abolished after the war under MC auspices. On March 17, 1948, the ship was turned over under MC agreement to A. L. Burbank & Company and she laid up in the Reserve Fleet in the Hudson River Reserve Fleet.

== Korean War ==
In support of the Korean War, the Bates Victory was brought out of the fleet in September 1950 and sold to Isbrandtsen Line on December 18, 1950. (Note: MARAD shows title to the ship passed at Jersey City, N.J. on December 10, 1950.) The ship was renamed Remsen Heights and in 1964 Isbrandtsen merged with American Export Lines to become American Export-Isbrandtsen Lines. On November 21, 1968, the ship was sold to Valmar Shipping Agency, New York, and renamed Eastern Star.

Eastern Star was sold to the Panamanian company Cia Comercial Transatlantica S.A., Panama and changed her flag to Panamanian registry as Philomila. In 1971 The ship was scrapped in Taiwan in 1971.
