= Lane Hall =

College building in Maine, US

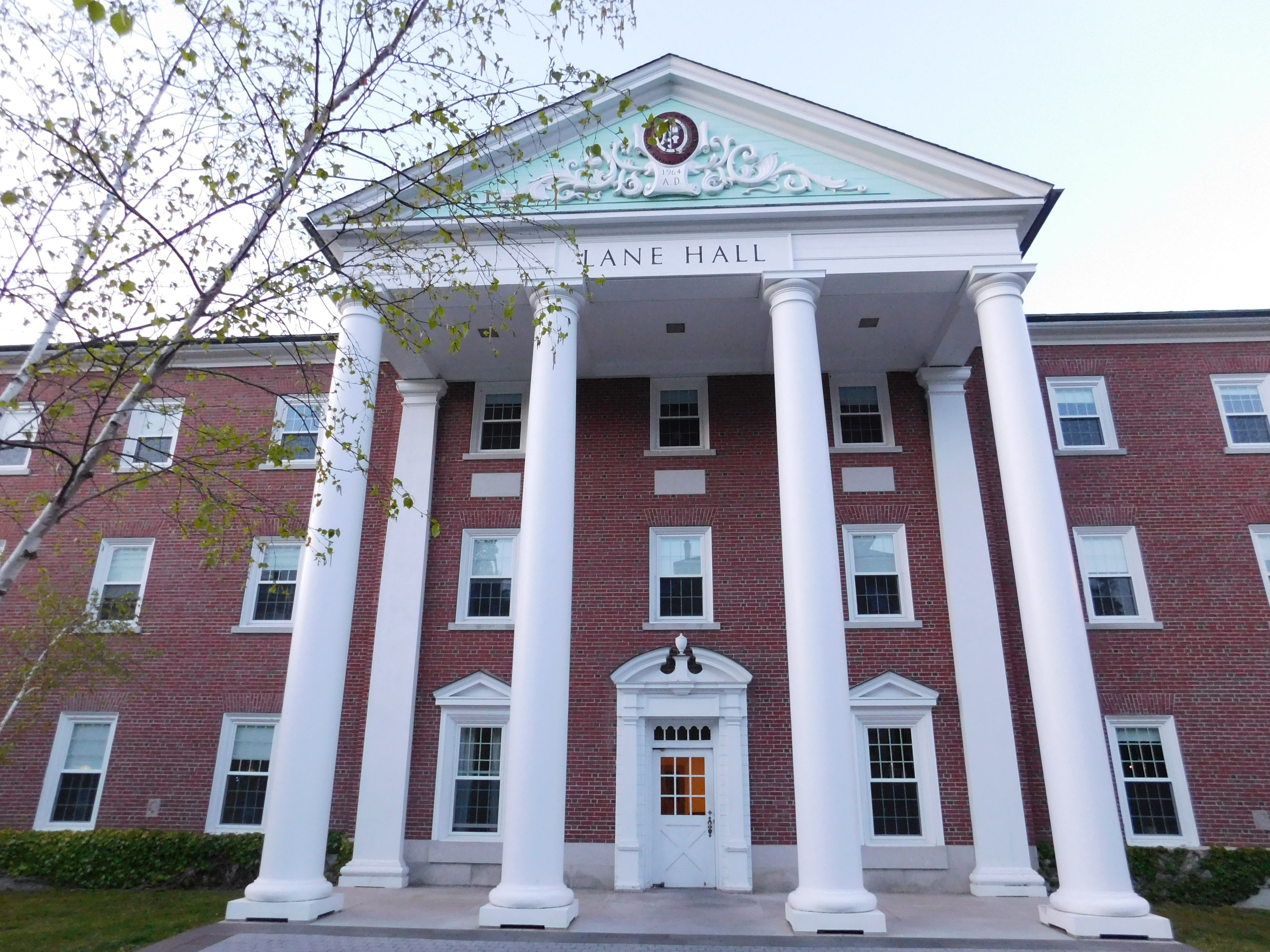
- The northern facade with a columned entrance, facing Hathorn Hall and the Historic Quad
- Interactive map of the Lane Hall area
- Alternative names: metonymically as the academic administration of Bates College

General information
- Status: Active and operational
- Architectural style: Neoclassical, Palladian
- Location: Lewiston, Maine, U.S.
- Construction started: 1963
- Completed: 1964
- Cost: $4.8 million in 2016 USD
- Owner: Bates College

Technical details
- Size: 29,000 square feet
- Floor count: 4

Lane Hall is a later 20th-century neoclassical building serving as the principal workplace and headquarters of the central administration of Bates College, located at 2 Andrews Road in Lewiston, Maine. It has been the principle administrative headquarters of every Bates president since Thomas Hedley Reynolds in 1964. Lane Hall was named after George Lane Jr., who served as treasurer of the college and secretary of the corporation. Lane overlooks the Historic Quadrangle of the college and protrudes from Lake Andrews.

== History ==
The construction of the Lane Hall began with the laying of the cornerstone in 1963, although there was no formal ceremony. The principal façade of the Lane Hall, from the north, is of four floors and eleven bays. The ground floor is hidden by a raised carriage ramp and parapet, thus the façade appears to be of three floors. The central three bays are behind a prostyle portico (this was a later addition to the hall, built in 1970) serving, thanks to the carriage ramp, as a porte cochere. The hall's southern façade is a combination of the Palladian and neoclassical styles of architecture. It is of three floors, all visible. The ground floor is rusticated in the Palladian fashion. At the center of the façade is a neoclassical projecting triangular point of four bays. The point is flanked by two bays, the windows of which, as on the north façade, have alternating segmented and pointed pediments at first-floor level. The bows cover two staircase levels leading to a colonnaded loggia, next to Pettengill Hall. Lane Hall was constructed at a totaled cost of $630,000 ($4.8 million in 2016 U.S. dollars.)

== See also ==
- History of Bates College
- List of Bates College people
