= List of New York State Historic Markers in Oneida County, New York =

This is an incomplete list of New York State Historic Markers in Oneida County, New York.

== Listings county-wide ==
Marker name	Image	Location	City/Town	Coords	Marker text
"Stone Church"		Nys 12B In Oriskany Falls	Oriskany Falls, New York	42°56′24.6″N 75°27′34.9″W	Built 1834 By The Congregational Society Dedication Sermon By Rev. O. Bartholomew, Early Pastor Rev. John Cross
Amos Parker		Augusta-Solsville Rd & Anderson Rd, 1.2 Miles South of Augusta	Augusta, Town Of, New York	42.95705°N 75.50101°W	1762–1842 Tallest Man In American Army. Saved Gen. La Fayette's Life. Present At The Surrender Of Cornwallis. Buried Here.
Augusta, New York		On NYS 26 In Augusta	Augusta, Town Of, New York	42.9757°N 75.50117°W	Oneida County March 15Th 1798 Formed From The Town Of Whitestown
Augusta Academy		Nys 12B In Oriskany Falls	Oriskany Falls, New York		Founded 1834. Semicircular Stone Building Used Until 1878. Its Unique Design Was A Curiosity. First Teacher Melville Adams.
Augusta Church		On NYS 26 In Augusta	Augusta, Town Of, New York	42.97607°N 75.50133°W	Organized 2797, By Congregational Society
Cassety Hollow		Nys 12-B & Nys 26 In Oriskany Falls	Oriskany Falls, New York	42°56′19.9″N 75°27′42.8″W	Settled In 1794 Thomas Cassety, Who Erected A Grist Mill Here. Later Renamed Oriskany Falls
Chenago Canal		Nys 26, Oriskany Falls	Oriskany Falls, New York		Authorized 1833. Utica To Binghamton. Completed 1836. 72 Locks In 30 Miles. Abandoned 1876
Dr. A. Burgoyne		South St. In Knoxboro	Knoxboro, New York		1737–1824 Buried In This Cemetery. Was Physician At Saratoga Under Gen. Burgoyne, 1777. Lived With Daughter In Augusta.
INDIAN TRAIL		Knoxboro Rd. In Knoxboro	Knoxboro, New York	42°59′10.7″N 75°31′19.99″W	Used By Oneida, Tuscarora, Brotherton And Stockbridge Indians As A Channel Of Commerce About 1700. Made Highway Soon After 1800
Knox House		South St. In Knoxboro	Knoxboro, New York		Built 1820 By Gen. J. J. Knox, Pioneer Settler, 1791–1876. Village Of Knoxboro Named In His Honor
Site of Log School		Augusta-Solsville Rd., in Augusta	Augusta, Town Of, New York	42.97291°N 75.5016°W	First In Augusta, Built 1797. Augusta Then Known As Bartlett's Corner. Used As Church And Meeting House
Site of		College St. Rd., 1/2 Mile North Of Oriskany Falls	Oriskany Falls, New York		The Gunn House About 500 Feet From Here Built In 1793. First House In The Town Of Augusta Built By A White Settler.
Site of		West St. In Knoxboro	Knoxboro, New York		Lock Company Organized 2862, By J.c. Knox. High Grade Locks Were Manufactured Here For A Number Of Years.
Union Church		South & East Sts., Knoxboro	Knoxboro, New York		Built 1849 By Methodists And Presbyterians. Lumber Hauled From Old Church Built About 1800 On East Hills. Converted To School 1873.
Utica Clinton		Broad St., Oriskany Falls	Oriskany Falls, New York		Binghamton R.r. Formed 1862. Completed From Utica To Terminate At This Site 1858, Extended South 1871
Black River Canal		On Nys 12 In Boonville	Boonville, Town Of, New York		Site Of Lock 71, Summit Level; 710 Feet Above Rome; From Here Water Flowed North To St Lawrence, South To Mohawk
Black River Canal		Nys 46 At Entrance To Pixley Falls Park	Boonville, Town Of, New York		Site Of The Once Famous Five Combines-world's Record For Number Of Canal Locks; Canal Has 109 Locks In 35 Miles Of Waterway
Boonville, New York		On Nys 12-D In Boonville	Boonville, Town Of, New York		Settled 1795; Named For Gerrit Boon, Native Leyden, Holland, Agent Of Holland Land Co.; Town Formed 1805; Village Incorporated 1855
FIRST PRESBYTERIAN CHURCH		So. Side James St., Boonville	Boonville, Town Of, New York		Society Organized 1805 Present Edifice Built 1855–1856 Re-dedication 1955
OLD FRENCH ROAD		On Nys 12, 1 Mile S.e. Of Boonville	Boonville, Town Of, New York		Built By French Colonists, 1790 On Way To Settle Castorland; First Road To North Country, Following An Iroquois War Trail.
BIRTHPLACE OF		Town Rd. At Babcock Hill	Bridgewater, Town Of, New York		Dr. Stephen Moulton Babcock Inventor Of Babcock Milk Test Scientist, Educator, Friend Benefactor Of Agriculture 1843–1931
BRIDGEWATER		On Us 20 In Bridgewater	Bridgewater, Town Of, New York		Oneida County March 24Th 1797 Transferred From Chenango County April 4, 1804
DEERFIELD		Nys 8, 2 Mis. No. Of Nys 5 & 12	Deerfield, Town Of, New York		Oneida County March 15Th 1798 Formed From The Town Of Schuyler Herkimer County
ARROW		Nys 12, 1 Mi. No. Of Nys 5	Deerfield, Town Of, New York		17 Miles Tomb Of Baron Steuben In State Memorial Park Near Remsen
FLOYD		Nys 46 In Floyd	Floyd, Town Of, New York		March 4Th 1796 Named In Honor Of William Floyd, 1734–1821 A Signer Of The Declaration Of Independence
FORESTPORT		River And White Lake Sts. In Forestport	Forestport, Town Of, New York		Town-1869. Village-1903. First Settlement 1795 In 1777 St. Leger's Indians Retreated Through Here Oriskany To Crown Point.
ST. LEGER'S HILL		N. Lake Rd., 5 Mis. East Of Forestport	Forestport, Town Of, New York		1777 Easterly Over This Route 450 Of St. Leger's Indians Retreated From Oriskany To Crown Point
ELIHU ROOT		Hamilton College Campus, Clinton	Kirkland, Town Of, New York		Secretary Of War Secretary Of State United States Senator Was Born In This Building February 15, 1845
FIRST GRIST MILL		Nys 412 In Clinton	Kirkland, Town Of, New York		Near This Spot First Grist Mill Was Built In Winter Of 1787. Before This Early Settlers Had To Carry Grist To Whitestown
HAMILTON COLLEGE		Hamilton College Campus, Clinton	Kirkland, Town Of, New York		Founded As Hamilton-oneida Academy, 1793 By The Rev. Samuel Kirkland. Chartered As Hamilton College May 26, 1812.
HAMILTON COLLEGE CHAPEL		Hamilton College Campus, Clinton	Kirkland, Town Of, New York		1827 An Unusual And Distinctive Three Story Church Desigened By Philip Hooker Of Albany
WASHINGTON TRACT		Nys 233, 1½ Mis. South Of Kirkland	Kirkland, Town Of, New York		These Lands Are Part Of Parcel Of Ground Deeded To Nathaniel Griffin By George Washington And Dewitt Clinton In 1790
[ARROW] 17 MILES		Nys 49 And Nys 12-C	Marcy, Town Of, New York		Tomb Of Baron Steuben In State Memorial Park Near Remsen
HOME OF		Nys 315, 4 Mis., N.w. Of Waterville	Marshall, Town Of, New York		Brotherton Indians 1783–1850 Among Whom Lived, 1785–1792, Samson Occom Indian Presbyterian Preacher
1ST RELIGIOUS		Nys 5 And Nys 12, New Hartford	New Hartford, Town Of, New York		Society Of The Town Of Whitestown Organized 1791 Church Dedicated Nov. 29, 1797
A GRIST MILL		Oxford Pl. & Mill St., New Hartford	New Hartford, Town Of, New York		Was Built 350 Feet East Of Here In 1790 By Jedediah Sanger, First Settler And Founder Of New Hartford
JEDEDIAH SANGER		Nys 5 And Nys 12, New Hartford	New Hartford, Town Of, New York		Founded New Hartford In 1788 By Purchasing 1000 Acres Of Land And Settling Here With His Family
BIRTHPLACE OF		Pinnacle Rd., In Sauquoit	Paris, Town Of, New York		[Arrow] Dr. Asa Gray Born November 18, 1810 Died January 30, 1888 World Famous Botanist
BIRTHPLACE OF		Pinnacle Rd., In Sauquoit	Paris, Town Of, New York		[Arrow] Dr. Asa Gray Born November 18, 1810 Died January 30, 1888 World Famous Botanist
METHODIST CHURCH		Mohawk St. At Pinnacle Rd. In Sauquoit	Paris, Town Of, New York		First Sermon Preached In Northern New York 1788 By Elder Freeborn Garretson Within Whitestown Sauquoit Society Formed 1788 First In Conference
ARROW		Nys 8 At Pinnacle Rd., In Sauquoit	Paris, Town Of, New York		7/8 Mile Birthplace Of Dr. Asa Gray World Famous Botanist
REMSEN		Nys 12-B, Remsen	Remsen, Town Of, New York	43°19′39″N 75°11′13″W	Oneida County March 15Th 1798 Formed From The Town Os Norway, Herkimer County
ARROW		Nys 12-B, Remsen	Remsen, Town Of, New York		Next Turn Right To Tomb Of Baron Steuben In State Memorial Park
ARROW		Fairchild Rd., North Of Hinckley Reservoir	Remsen, Town Of, New York		1 Mile East Col. Marinus Willett Routed British-tory Force Oct. 30, 1783 Along West Canada Creek; Walter Butler, Tory Leader Was Killed By An Oneida
ARROW		Nys 12 12-B, Remsen	Remsen, Town Of, New York		4 Miles Tomb Of Baron Steuben In State Memorial Park Near Remsen
1755–1756		E. Dominick & Bouck Sts.	Rome, City Of, New York		[Arrow] Revolutionary Battlefields And Colonial Fort Sites
1755–1756		Bouck St. Between E. Whitesboro & E. Dominick Sts.	Rome, City Of, New York		Fort Williams Guarded Upper Mohawk Landing Burned In A Panic By British Gen. Webb
DURING SIEGE OF		E. Bloomfield St. & Harding Blvd.	Rome, City Of, New York	43°12′39.9″N 75°26′26″W	Fort Stanwix Aug. 1777 Main British Camp Was Between This Point And Bluff To South
FORT CRAVEN		E. Whitesboro St. Between Bouck & Mill Sts.	Rome, City Of, New York		Destroyed In British Panic Before Completion Aug. 31, 1756
FORT NEWPORT		Calvert St. Between Arsenal St. And Brewer Alley	Rome, City Of, New York		A Small Colonial Post Which Guarded Upper Wood Creek Landing Place
HERE PASSED		W. Dominick & Jay Sts.	Rome, City Of, New York		Ancient Carry Passed Southward To Fort Newport And Wood Creek
HERE PASSED		George And Liberty Sts.	Rome, City Of, New York		From East To West The Ancient Carry From The Mohawk To Wood Creek
INLAND CANAL		So. James & E. Whitesboro Sts.	Rome, City Of, New York		Begun 1792 And Second Erie Canal Completed 1844
OLD BLACK RIVER CANAL		Black R. Blvd. & E. Whitesboro St.	Rome, City Of, New York		Building 1836–1855; Connected Mohawk Valley With Black River Country; Opening Up 90 Miles Navigable Waterway; Joined Erie Canal Here.
ROME		No. James & W. Park Sts.	Rome, City Of, New York		March 4Th 1796 Formed From The Town Of Steuben
SITE OF		W. Dominick St. Between Arsenal & Jay Sts.	Rome, City Of, New York		U.s. Arsenal Maintained During War Of 1812 And Subsequently
THE CENTRAL N.Y.		On Nys 26	Rome, City Of, New York		School For The Deaf Founded Jan. 27, 1875 By Alphonso Johnson, Thomas Gallaudet And Rome Citizens
ARROW		W. Dominick St. & Arsenal Sts.	Rome, City Of, New York		One Block To Site Of Fort Newport And Wood Creek Landing
ARROW		E. Dominick St. Between James And Spring Sts.	Rome, City Of, New York		Historic Elm This Elm Was A Sapling Growing On The Southwest Bastion Of Fort Stanwix In 1804
ARROW		Nys 69 At Oriskany Battlefield	Rome, City Of, New York		Lower Landing And Oriskany Battlefield
ARROW		Mill And E, Whitesboro Sts.	Rome, City Of, New York		Fort Stanwix And Revolutionary Skirmishes
NORWEST 35 RODS		Nys 46, 2 Mis. N. Of Rome	Rome, Town Of, New York		Jesse Williams In 1851 Inaugurated The Cheese Factory System Thus Revolutionizing Dairying
ORISKANY		Nys 69 At Oriskany Battlefield	Rome, Town Of, New York		Battlefield 1777 Public Welcome
ARROW		Nys 46 North Of Rome	Rome, Town Of, New York		20 Miles Tomb Of Baron Steuben In State Memorial Park Near Remsen
BIRTHPLACE OF		Nys 12 In Waterville	Sangerfield, Town Of, New York		George Eastman Inventor Of Kodak Born July 12, 1854 Died In Rochester March 14, 1932
PROPERTY LINE		Nys 12 North Of Waterville	Sangerfield, Town Of, New York		Western Boundary Of Civilization Fixed By Fort Stanwix Treaty Nov. 5, 1768. Witnessed By Sir William Johnson
SANGERFIELD		Nys 12 At Town Line	Sangerfield, Town Of, New York		Oneida County March 15Th 1795 Transferred From Chenango County April 4Th 1804.
300 FEET WEST		Co. Rd., 1 Mi. W. Of Remsen	Steuben, Town Of, New York		Site Of Home Robert Everett (1791–1875) Anti-slavery Reformer Minister Chapel Ucha 37 Years Editor "Cenhadwr" (Welsh) 35 Years
BARON STEUBEN		At Baron Steuben Memorial	Steuben, Town Of, New York		Instector General Of Army Major General In Revolution Citizen Of United States And New York State
BURIAL PLACE		In Field 1/4 Mi. N. Of Co. Rd., 2 Mis. E. Of Steuben	Steuben, Town Of, New York		Of Samuel Sizer, Abigail Sizer, Asa Sizer And Abigail Tyler Mitchell, The Mother Of Abigail Sizer
CAPEL ISAF OR		Co. Rd., 1 Mi. W. Of Remsen	Steuben, Town Of, New York		Second Baptist Church Once Located Here Cared For The Grave Of Baron Steuben For Ninety-five Years (1804–1899)
CAPT. SIMEIN WOODRUFF		Co. Rd., 1/2 Mi. W. Of Remsen	Steuben, Town Of, New York		Circumnavigated Globe With Capt. Cook. Leased This Farm May 26, 1791 From Baron Steuben Buried Capel Ucha Cemetery
EENEZER WEEKS		Co. Rd., 1/2 Mi. W. Of Remsen	Steuben, Town Of, New York		Settled Here 1791 Buried In Adjoining Meadow Built Bake Oven And Did Coopering For Baron Steuben
FIRST GRAVE		Co. Rd. W. Of Baron Steuben Memorial	Steuben, Town Of, New York		Of Baron Steuben Near This Spot By His Own Wish He Was Buried Wrapped In His Military Cloak In An Unmarked Grave
FRIEDRICH WILHELM		At Baron Steuben Memorial	Steuben, Town Of, New York		Baron Von Steuben Born September 17, 1730 Magdeburg, Germany Died Here November 28, 1794 Erection Completed 1872
FULLER FARM		Co. Rd., 1 Mi. W. Of Remsen	Steuben, Town Of, New York		Acquired 1793 From Baron Steuben By Capt. Simeon Fuller, B. 1761-D. 1852 Held By Him And His Descendants To The Present Day
GERMAN-AMERICAN		At Baron Steuben Memorial	Steuben, Town Of, New York		Organizations Assisted By State Of New York Erected This Tomb In Honor Of Their Great Fellow Countryman
SACRED GROVE		At Baron Steuben Memorial	Steuben, Town Of, New York		Is The Name Given In 1804 To These Woods Hallowed By Associations With Baron Steuben, The American Patriot
SAMUEL SIZER		Co. Rd. 2 Mis. E. Of Steuben	Steuben, Town Of, New York		First Settler On Steuben Grant, 1787. Farm Manager For Baron Steuben Burial Place In Meadow 80 Rods North Of This Marker
SAW-MILL		Nr. Creek, No. Of Fuller Rd.	Steuben, Town Of, New York		Of Baron Steuben Built 1790 Near This Spot Remains Of Dam Visible
STARR HILL		Co. Rd.1 Mi. W. Of Baron Steuben Memorial	Steuben, Town Of, New York		Named For David Starr Captain In Continental Army Friend And Neighbor Of Baron Steuben Settled Here 1791
STEUBEN GRANT		Co. Rd. W. Of Baron Steuben Memorial	Steuben, Town Of, New York		Of 16,000 Acres By The State Of New York, June 27, 1786 For Service In The Revolution He Cleared Sixty Acres Near Here For Home Site (1788–1793)
STEUBEN STATE		At Baron Steuben Memorial	Steuben, Town Of, New York		Memorial Park Dedicated September 12, 1931 By Franklin D. Roosevelt, Governor Of New York
STEUBEN STATE		At Baron Steuben Memorial	Steuben, Town Of, New York		Memorial Park Included Fifty Acres Given In 1804 By Col. Benj. Walker, Friend And Aide Of Steuben, To Second Baptist Church
THIS MONUMENT		At Baron Steuben Memorial	Steuben, Town Of, New York		Covers The Remains Of Baron Steuben Governor Horatio Seymour Laid Cornerstone June 1, 1870 Erection Completed 1872
THIS PARK		At Baron Steuben Memorial	Steuben, Town Of, New York		Was Created In Memory Of Friedrich Wilhelm Baron Steuben, Major General In The War For Independence
TOWN OF STEUBEN		Nys 46-A In Steuben	Steuben, Town Of, New York		Formed April 10, 1792 Named In Honor Of Baron Steuben Originally Extended To North Bounds Of The State
WELSH IMMIGRANTS		Co. Rd., 1/2 Mi. W. Of Remsen	Steuben, Town Of, New York		Beginning 1795 Cleared And Settled Greater Part Of Steuben Grant. Built First Church Here 1804.
ARROW		Co. Rd. From Steuben & Remsen	Steuben, Town Of, New York		2 Miles Tomb Of Baron Steuben In State Memorial Park
CINCINNATI CREEK		Nys 28, 2 Mis. S. E. Of Trenton	Trenton, Town Of, New York		Named By Baron Steuben To Commemorate The Society Of The Cincinnati Which He Helped To Found In 1783
TRENTON		Nys 12 In Barneveld	Trenton, Town Of, New York		Oneida County March 24, 1797 Formed From The Town Of Schuyler, Herkimer County
BAGG'S TAVERN		Genesee And Main St.	Utica, City Of, New York		Originally A Log House Founded 1794 By Moses Bagg Washington, La Fayette Henry Clay & Gen. Grant Were Guests Here
ARROW		Fuller Rd @ Nys 274	Town of Remsen, New York		2 Mi Tomb Of Baron Steuben In State Memorial Park Near Remsen
[ARROW] 17 MILES		Nys 5 E. Of Nys 8 & 12	Utica, City Of, New York		Tomb Of Baron Steuben In State Memorial Park Near Remsen
MISSION CHURCH		Seneca Ave. Between Verona And Sconon Dora Sts. In Vernon	Vernon, Town Of, New York		Of The Oneidas Built By Rev. Eleazer Williams 1818 Moved In 1842 From Oneida Castle By Unitarians. Vernon Town Hall Since 1892.
ONEIDA CASTLE		Nys 5 In Oneida Castle Village	Vernon, Town Of, New York		Chief Village Of Oneida Tribe Of Indians Members Of Iroquois Confederacy
ROYAL		Nys 13 In Sylvan Beach	Verona, Town Of, New York		Blockhouse 60 Rods East Of This Point Stood Fort Erected By British In 1759
STARK'S LANDING		Nys 46 In Higinsville	Verona, Town Of, New York		Javez Hough Stark, Pioneer Built 1St Presbyterian Church, Seneca Falls 1807. Came Here 1821; Built House Across Canal 1823-5.
WESTERN		Nys 46 Near School In Westernville	Western, Town Of, New York		Oneida County March 10, 1797 Formed From The Town Of Steuben
ARROW		Nys 46 & 46-A In Frenchville	Western, Town Of, New York		11 Miles Tomb Of Baron Steuben In State Memorial Park Near Remsen
BIRTHPLACE OF		Co. Rd. In Westmoreland	Westmoreland, Town Of, New York		Samuel Eels 1810–1842 Who In 1832 Founded The Alpha Delta Phi Fraternity At Hamilton College
1ST PRESBYTERIAN		Elm And Main Sts., Whitesboro	Whitestown, Town Of, New York		Church Of Whitesboro Organized April 1, 1793 Bethuel Dodd, 1St Pastor
ENGLISH HOME		Nys 69 In Yorkville	Whitestown, Town Of, New York		Built 1792. Birthplace Of Henry Inman, 1801-46 Artist Who Excelled In Portraits, Landscapes And Miniatures
HERE STOOD THE HOME OF		Dexter Ave. Between Graham And Utica Sts. In Oriskany	Whitestown, Town Of, New York		Colonel Gerrit G. Lansing Officer In Cont. Army Who Purchased Land Whereon Oriskanyt Was Founded 1902
SITE OF		Nys 69 In Oriskany	Whitestown, Town Of, New York		Woolen Mill Erected In 1810 Believed To Be The 1St In America To Manufacture Fabrics From Raw Material
TOWN HALL		In Front Of Town Hall, Whitesboro	Whitestown, Town Of, New York		Erectd 1807 Early Co. Court House Presented To Whitestown By Hon. Philo White 1860
WHITESTOWN		Main St. & Victor Pkwy., Whitesboro	Whitestown, Town Of, New York		March 7Th 1788 Named In Honor Of Judge Hugh White A First Settler May 1784

== See also ==
- List of New York State Historic Markers
- National Register of Historic Places listings in New York
- List of National Historic Landmarks in New York
