= Graniteville =

Graniteville may refer to the following places in the United States:

- Graniteville, California, a town
- Graniteville, Connecticut a historic district
- Graniteville, Missouri, an unincorporated community
- Graniteville, Staten Island, New York, neighborhood in New York City
- Graniteville, South Carolina, unincorporated community in Aiken County, South Carolina
- Graniteville, Vermont, census-designated place

== See also ==
- Graniteville Historic District (disambiguation)
