= Burrstone Hill =

Mountain in New York, United States

- Location within New York Location within the United States

Highest point
- Elevation: 600 feet (180 m)
- Coordinates: 43°06′01″N 75°16′49″W

Geography
- Location: NE of Utica, New York, U.S.
- Topo map: USGS Utica West

Burrstone Hill is a summit located in Central New York Region of New York located partially in the City of Utica and Town of Whitestown.
