= William Whitely (instrument maker) =

American instrument maker

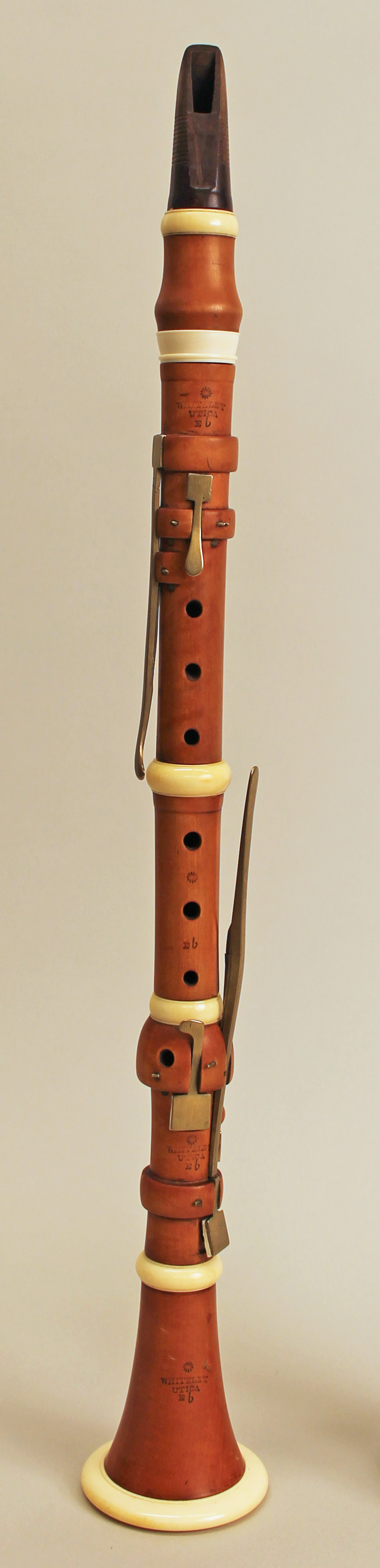
E♭ clarinet, made by Whiteley in Utica.

William Whiteley (1789 – March 25, 1871) was an American musical instrument maker and author whose work is featured in several American museum collections.

He was born in Lebanon-Goshen, Connecticut to John L. and Rebecca (née Waterman) Whiteley; while here, it is likely that William was the apprentice of instrument maker Erastus Wattles (1778 – 1839). The Whiteley family moved to Utica, New York, following John's death.

By 1810, Whiteley had established a music shop in Utica, where he primarily made woodwind instruments. This shop remained open until his retirement in 1853. His business was notable, primarily, for the several types of clarinet he made (in keys of F, E-flat, C, B-flat, and A) in both the English and American (Continental) styles. He married Emily Parmelee on November 22, 1815.

In 1816, Whiteley published a book, The Instrumental Preceptor, which provided instruction on playing technique for clarinet, flute, and bassoon.

Several of Whiteley's instruments are today held in museum collections, including pieces held by the Smithsonian Institution's Museum of American History, the Library of Congress, and The Metropolitan Museum of Art.

Whitely died in 1871 in Knoxboro, and is buried in the Knoxboro-Augusta Cemetery of Augusta, New York.
