= Crystal Mall =

Crystal Mall may refer to:

- Crystal Mall (British Columbia), a mall in Burnaby, British Columbia, Canada
- Crystal Mall (Connecticut), a former mall in Waterford, Connecticut, United States
