= Waterville Central School District =

School district in New York, United States

Address
- 381 Madison Street Waterville, Oneida County, New York, 13480; United States

District information
- Type: Public
- Grades: PreK–12
- Schools: 2
- NCES District ID: 3630160

Students and staff
- Students: 756
- Teachers: 65
- Staff: 121
- Student–teacher ratio: 11.63
- Colors: Purple and Gold

Other information
- Website: www.watervillecsd.org

Waterville Central School District is a school district headquartered in Waterville, New York. It operates Waterville Central School.

The district includes all or portions of the following towns in Oneida County: Augusta, Kirkland, Marshall, Paris, Sangerfield and Vernon. Additionally, it includes portions of two towns in Madison County: Brookfield and Madison. Within Oneida County, it includes the villages of Waterville and Oriskany Falls.
