= Knoxboro, New York =

- Hamlet
- Location within New York Location within the United States
- Coordinates: 42°59′11″N 75°31′02″W
- Country: United States
- State: New York
- County: Oneida
- Elevation: 1,096 ft (334 m)
- Time zone: UTC-5 (Eastern (EST))
  - Summer (DST): UTC-4 (EDT)
- ZIP code: 13362
- Area codes: 315 & 680
- GNIS feature ID: 954798

Knoxboro is a hamlet in Oneida County, New York, United States. The community is 4.3 miles (6.9 km) northwest of Oriskany Falls. Knoxboro has a post office with ZIP code 13362.

Knoxboro falls within the bounds of the town of Augusta. The hamlet, prior to World War I, was home to several industries, including a creamery and pea canning company.

A 1878 history of Oneida County states that the community was first called Cook's Corners, and then Knox's Corners, before finally being called Knoxboro. A postoffice was established in 1850 and James C. Knox was the first postmaster. John J. Knox opened a store in 1811, and his family is the source of the community's name. In 1878, the community is reported as containing two stores, two blacksmith shops, a carriage shop, tin shop, two shoeshops, millinery and dress-making establishments, as well as churches, schools, and a hotel.

Noted 19th century instrument maker William Whitely also resided here during his retirement, and several artefacts found in his Knoxboro home are considered to be important relics for the study of early American musical instrument manufacture.

In the 21st century, Knoxboro has experienced several damaging floods, culminating in a 2013 flood which washed out parts of a major road.

The hamlet also lends its name to the Knoxboro buildup, a paleontological site featuring the remains of a Devonian Age coral reef. Discovered at this site, the prehistoric coral species Briantelasma knoxboroense is also named after the community.
