= Nathan A. Woodworth House =

Historic house in Connecticut, United States

- U.S. National Register of Historic Places
- U.S. Historic district – Contributing property
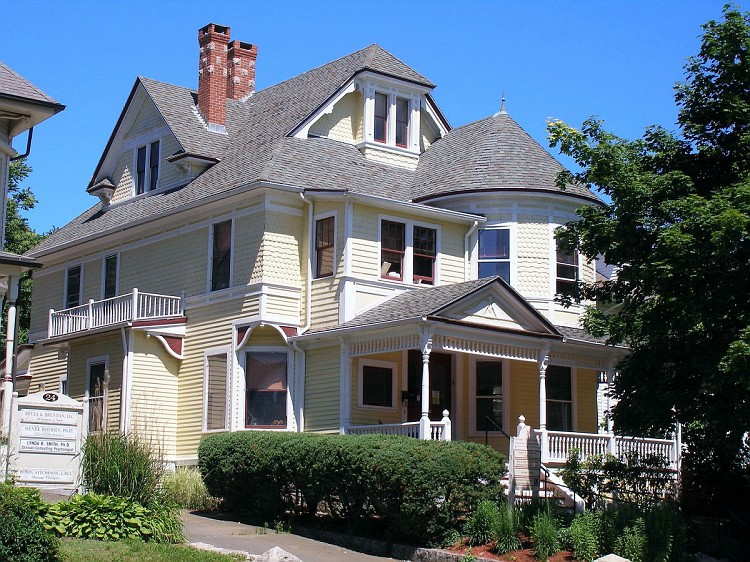

- Location within Connecticut Location within the United States
- Location: 28 Channing Street, New London, Connecticut
- Coordinates: 41°21′33″N 72°6′20″W
- Area: 0.2 acres (0.081 ha)
- Built: 1890
- Built by: Bishop Bros.
- Architectural style: Stick/Eastlake, Queen Anne
- Part of: Post Hill Historic District (ID93000812)
- NRHP reference No.: 82004378

Significant dates
- Added to NRHP: June 1, 1982
- Designated CP: August 5, 1993

The Nathan A. Woodworth House is a historic house at 28 Channing Street in New London, Connecticut. Built in 1890, it is a high quality example of transitional Queen Anne and Shingle style architecture. It was listed on the National Register of Historic Places on June 1, 1982, and is part of the Post Hill Historic District.

== Description and history ==
The Nathan A. Woodworth House is located in a residential area west of downtown New London, overlooking Williams Park on the west side of Channing Street at Granite Street. It is a 2 1/2-story wood-frame structure, with asymmetrical massing and a busy roof line characteristic of the Queen Anne style. It has a number of different types of projections and roof gables, decorative chimney caps, and a front porch with turned posts and balustrade. The interior features finely crafted woodwork, fireplaces with decorative tile surrounds, and a main staircase newel post with an integrated gas light fixture.

The house was built in 1890 for Nathan Woodworth, who was in the paper milling business in nearby Waterford; its design appears to be an adaptation from an architectural pattern book. The land on which it was built was purchased by Woodworth's father in 1865, and sold to his (Nathan's) wife in 1890. Construction of this house contributed to the reputation of the Williams Park area as a desirable upper-class residential enclave. Its builders, the Bishop Brothers, were one of the best-known construction firms in the city at the time.

== See also ==
- National Register of Historic Places listings in New London County, Connecticut
