= Jordan Village, Connecticut =

- Jordan Village Historic District
- U.S. National Register of Historic Places
- U.S. Historic district
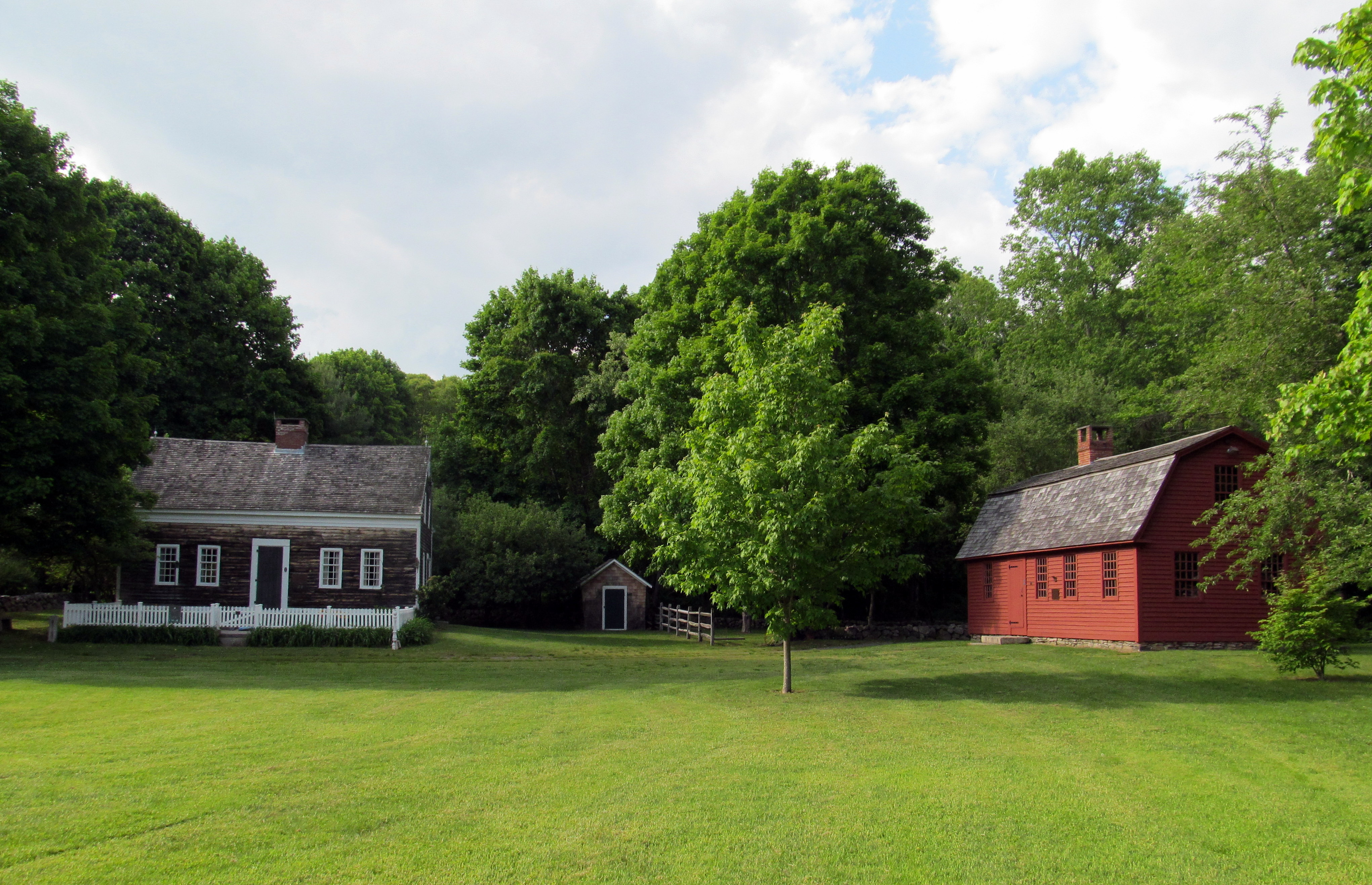
- The 1838 Beebe Phillips house (left) and the 1740 Jordan Schoolhouse on Jordan Green

- Location within Connecticut Location within the United States
- Location: Junction of North Road and Avery Lane with Rope Ferry Road, Waterford, Connecticut
- Coordinates: 41°20′23″N 72°8′33″W
- Area: 57 acres (23 ha)
- Built: 1848
- Architectural style: Greek Revival, Queen Anne
- NRHP reference No.: 90001289
- Added to NRHP: August 23, 1990

Jordan is a village in the town of Waterford, Connecticut, United States and the historic center of the town. It was named after the Jordan River. The village was listed on the National Register of Historic Places as Jordan Village Historic District in 1990.

== Location ==
Jordan Village is located on land known historically as Jordan Plain, a flat land area at the head of Jordan Cove, an estuary off Long Island Sound. The historic district is centered on the intersection of Rope Ferry Road and North Road, two important early roads, providing access to New London to the east, the Niantic River ferry to the west, and the agricultural interior to the north. Although Rope Ferry Road was laid out early in the 18th century, there is only one 18th-century house in the village, and most of its architecture dates to the middle and late 19th century. Most of the buildings in the village are residential in use, with the 1848 Baptist Church the important exception. Jordan Park, a public park established early in the 20th century, also houses the town library and an 18th-century district schoolhouse.

The village's origins lie in the founding of the Baptist congregation in 1710, when the area was still part of New London. Sectional differences with Congregationalists in New London led to Waterford's eventual separation from that community. The village's economy developed in the 19th century, with a mill on Jordan Pond, whose remains lie between Rope Ferry Road and Jordan Pond. It experienced a minor building boom after the new Baptist Church was built in 1848; this is when most of its Greek Revival housing stock was built.

The village center has remained a well-preserved example of a 19th-century village, with modern development taking place mostly around its fringes.

== See also ==
- National Register of Historic Places listings in New London County, Connecticut
