= Whitestown Town Hall =

- U.S. National Register of Historic Places
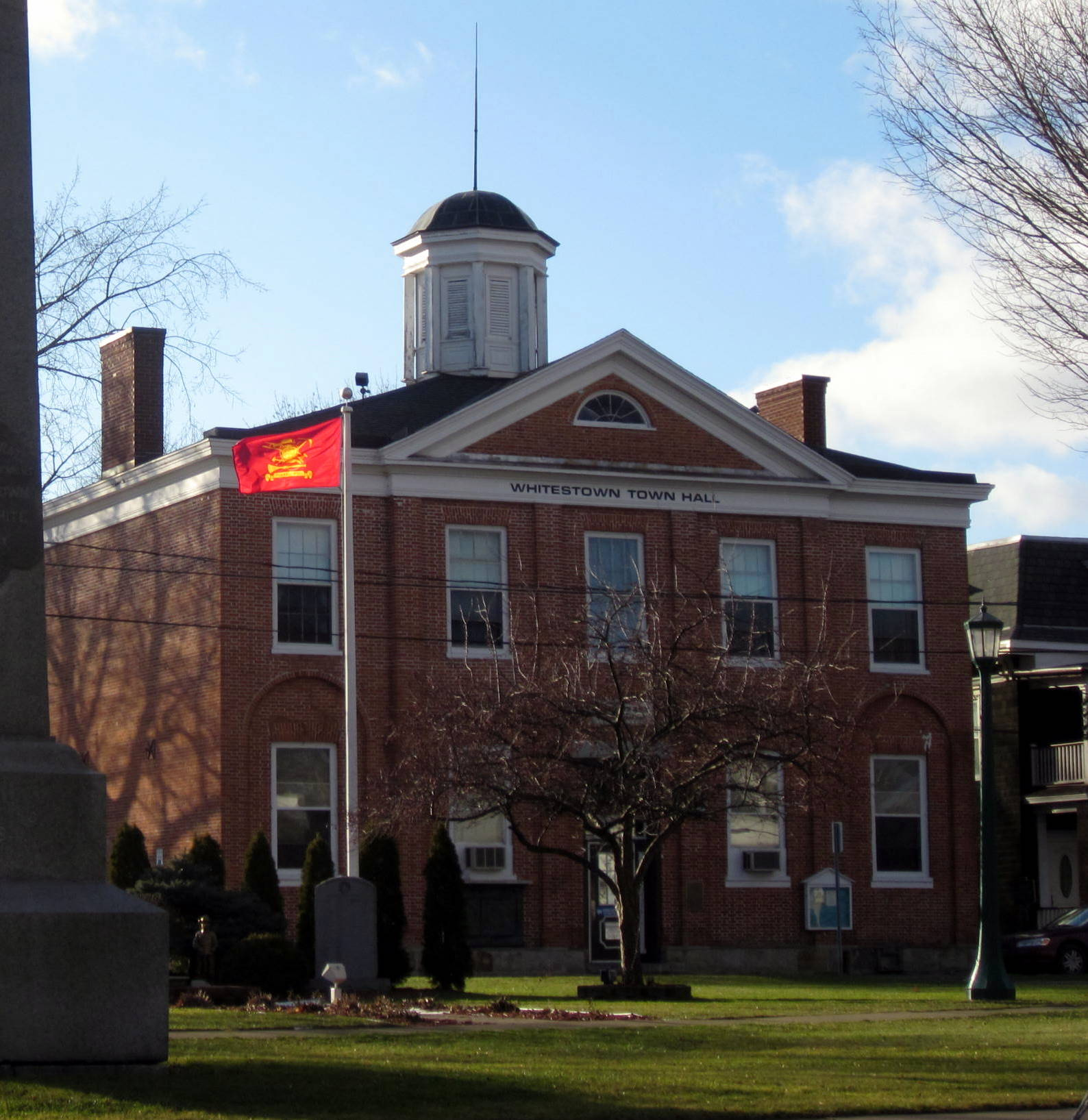
- Whitestown Town Hall, January 2012

- Location within New York Location within the United States
- Location: 8 Park Ave., Whitesboro, New York
- Coordinates: 43°7′16″N 75°17′30″W
- Area: less than one acre
- Built: 1807
- NRHP reference No.: 73001231
- Added to NRHP: November 26, 1973

Whitestown Town Hall, also known as Liberty Hall, is a historic town hall building located at Whitesboro in Oneida County, New York. It was built in 1807 and is a two-story brick structure situated on the village green. It features 4 two-story pilasters which are terminated at the top by a simple wood cornice.

It was listed on the National Register of Historic Places in 1973.

It currently serves as the village courthouse, while offices for the town of Whitestown are housed in newer buildings outside of Whitesboro.
