= Sara Juli =

American dancer and choreographer

- Known for: Dance theater, choreography

Sara Juli is an American modern dancer and choreographer who creates and performs solo works informed by daily life, combining elements of concert dance, comedy and storytelling. Juli is also the founder and director of Surala Consulting, a company specializing in strategic fundraising solutions.

== Early life and education ==
Juli was born in Waterford, Connecticut. She graduated with honors from Skidmore College in Saratoga Springs, New York in 2000 with a degree in Dance and Anthropology, and worked in New York City from 2000–2014. She resides in Portland, Maine, and performs throughout the United States and internationally.

== Career ==
=== Early years ===
Juli first started dancing at the age of three. Juli's first independent all-evening performance of The Money Conversation debuted in February, 2006. The piece explores Juli's relationship with money by taking $5,000 from her own savings, and giving it to her audience throughout the show. After the show was over, audience members could choose to take the money, return it, or return it and donate to the show. The Money Conversation toured nationally and internationally from 2007–2012 to sold-out houses in The Netherlands, Australia, New Zealand, London, Russia and around the United States.

=== Comedy Dance Theater ===
Juli, went on to embrace the intersection of movement, text, and humor when she created Tense Vagina: an actual diagnosis, in 2015, which addressed the issues with bladder control and motherhood that Juli dealt with after childbirth. The Portland Press Herald called the performance "hysterical" and said that "Juli was not afraid to push some sacred boundaries as she explored the medical diagnosis and her role as a mother". The performance is partly interactive, where in one show, she ties an audience member's shoe, rocks a woman in her lap and helps a man blow his nose. The show debuted in Maine but went on to tour all across the United States as well as internationally, culminating in a run at the 2017 Edinburgh Fringe Festival lauded as "an imaginative and brave show performed with fearless vulnerability by the warm, wild and untamed Sara Juli".

She performed an excerpt of Shadow Artist in the Portland, Maine City Council Chamber for the "Artist in the Chamber" program in 2017, which went viral within 48 hours.

In 2019 Juli premiered Burnt-Out Wife, investigating the deterioration of marriage. It criticized marriage from multiple angles by using a "standup-comedy routine(s) with dance interludes", for which Juli was called, "a master storyteller channeling over-the-top humor to help us digest a very serious topic". Eva Yaa Asantewaa wrote in her blog InfiniteBody, "She turns her hideous bathroom into a throne room worthy of pissed-as-hell royalty." Dance Informa reported that "Burnt-Out Wife isn’t a dance show. It’s an everything show performed by one woman who knows how to use movement to get her point across." Burnt-Out Wife was performed at Dixon Place in New York City, Capitol Center for the Arts, 3S Arts Space, and The Flynn Center for the Performing Arts, among others, in 2020.

Juli’s most recent work, Naughty Bits, was commissioned by The Strand Theater in Rockland, Maine and had its World Premiere on October 13-14, 2023. Naughty Bits is a dance-play set inside Juli’s memories that examines trauma while finding levity within the tragic. Using movement, text, digital projections, comedy and a capella renditions of 1980’s iconic male-led songs, Naughty Bits finds the forgotten bits, funny bits (and wobbly bits) of reclaiming one’s body and mind. The Arts Fuse wrote "Sara Juli has proven herself to be a master of using humor to examine subjects that are uncomfortable and not at all comic", "...her approach is both light and dark — the audience finds itself laughing out loud and then gasping, sometimes crying tears of sorrow." Naughty Bits was also performed at 3S Arts Space in Portsmouth, NH, Dixon Place in New York City, Next Stage Arts in Putney, VT, and The Hill Arts in Portland, ME.

Juli's work has been performed in New York PS 122, The Chocolate Factory Theater, 92nd Street Y, The Bushwick Starr, New York Live Arts, Joe's Pub as part of the DANCENOW NYC Festival, The Ontological-Hysteric Theater, The Flea, Judson Church, and around the country including with the Napa Valley Opera House, Artown Reno, UC Riverside, the American Dance Festival, Carmel Indiana Center for the Performing Arts, Bates Dance Festival, The Yard on Martha's Vineyard, as well as numerous other venues and at universities and colleges.

=== Other works ===
Sara Juli performed a TEDxDirigo of Shadow Artist on the theme "RISE" in 2017.

Juli continues to work on choreographing and creating new solo work as well as running her consulting firm, Surala Consulting. Surala Consulting specializes in strategic fundraising solutions catering to the New York City and national performing arts community.

== Awards ==
- 2013, Juli is the recipient of the Arts Management Award from Brooklyn Arts Exchange.
- 2015, Tense Vagina received a New England Foundation for the Arts NEST Touring Grant and a New England Foundation for the Arts New England Dance Fund Grant.
- 2017, Juli was the singular recipient of a Maine Arts Fellowship for Dance, in recognition of "artistic excellence and [to] advance the careers of Maine artists."
- 2019, National Dance Project Award, "widely recognized as one of the country’s major sources of funding and field building for dance, supporting both the creation and touring of new works."

== See also ==
- Postmodern dance
- Women in dance
- Dance Theater
