= Intentional Theatre =

The Intentional Theatre in Waterford, Connecticut, was the fourth largest theater in the state of Connecticut and one of the leading community theaters in New England. It was founded in 2003 as a fully independent. The theater won a Hoo-Hah Award for its production of "State of the Art" by San Diego playwright Craig Abernethy in 2007.

The opening season featured Yasmina Reza's Tony Award-winning play, "ART". The theater also produced the New England premier of David Mamet's The Duck Variations in 2007.

Among those plays scheduled for the 2008–2009 season are Jim Gordon's "An Investment in Murder" and the New England premier of Jacob Appel's "The Replacement."

As of February 2015, the company was "on hiatus." Its website disappeared later that year.
