= Waterford, Connecticut =

- Town
- Town of Waterford
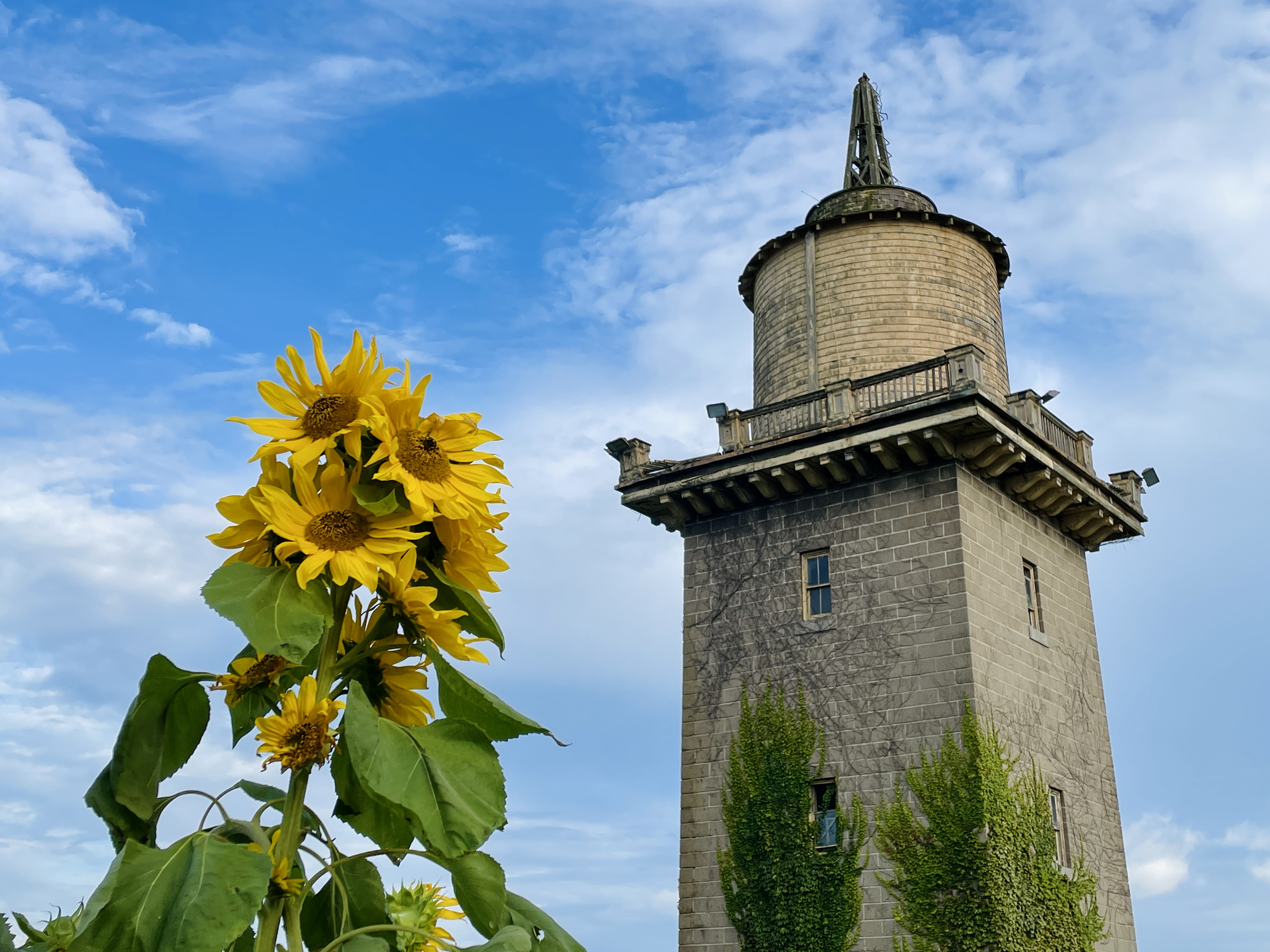
- The water tower at Harkness Memorial State Park

- Seal

- Coordinates: 41°20′59″N 72°08′49″W
- Country: United States
- U.S. state: Connecticut
- County: New London
- Region: Southeastern CT
- Incorporated: 1801

Government
  - Type: Representative town meeting
  - First Selectman: Robert J. Brule (R)
  - Selectman: Rich Muckle (R)
  - Selectman: Greg Attanasio (D)

Area
  - Total: 44.6 sq mi (115.4 km^{2})
  - Land: 32.8 sq mi (84.9 km^{2})
  - Water: 11.8 sq mi (30.5 km^{2})
- Elevation: 46 ft (14 m)

Population (2020)
  - Total: 19,571
  - Density: 597/sq mi (231/km^{2})
- Time zone: UTC−5 (Eastern)
  - Summer (DST): UTC−4 (Eastern)
- ZIP Codes: 06375, 06385
- Area codes: 860/959
- FIPS code: 09-80280
- GNIS feature ID: 0213526
- Website: www.waterfordct.org

Waterford is a town in New London County, Connecticut, United States. It is named after Waterford, Ireland. The town is part of the Southeastern Connecticut Planning Region. The population was 19,571 at the 2020 census. The town center is listed as a census-designated place (CDP) and had a population of 3,074 at the 2020 census.

== Geography ==
According to the United States Census Bureau, the town has a total area of 44.6 square miles (115.4 km^{2}), of which 32.8 square miles (84.9 km^{2}) is land and 11.8 square miles (30.5 km^{2}), or 26.43%, is water. The town center CDP has a total area of 1.9 square miles (4.9 km^{2}), all land. Waterford is bordered on the west by the Niantic River.

=== Principal communities ===
- Waterford
- Graniteville
- Jordan
- Millstone
- Morningside Park
- Quaker Hill (06375)
  - Bartlett Point, Best View, Thames View

Other minor communities and geographic features are Cohanzie Hill, East Neck, Fog Plain, Gilead, Goshen, Great Neck, Harrisons, Lake's Pond, Logger Hill, Mago Point, Magonk, Mullen Hill, Oswegatchie, Pepperbox Road, Pleasure Beach, Ridgewood Park, Riverside Beach, Spithead, Strand, West Neck, Waterford Village.

== History ==
=== Founding ===
The first people immigrated from England in 1637 and came to the New London and Waterford area (at the time, this land was called West Farms). One of the first people who set sail for this area was John Winthrop Jr. Waterford got its name for its proximity to being in between two rivers. The residents of Waterford resided in wigwams until they dug up plots for 38 houses near the Great Neck area. Winthrop was given several hundred acres of land, including Millstone Point and Alewife Cove. Various dams, mills, and ponds were constructed in these areas. The only expansion of people in the Waterford-New London area were the growth of families and children. Later on, more people immigrated to Waterford, including Welsh, Italian, Russian, Irish, and Scottish.

Waterford separated from New London on October 8, 1801. This happened after several farmers signed a petition to separate them. The first town meeting was held in November 1801 to appoint town officials: tax collectors, town surveyors, fence viewers, and first selectman. Only the first selectman got paid at the time.

=== 19th century ===
Waterford was a large agricultural town in the 19th century, having mostly sheep farms. Waterford was also widely known for its granite industry that lasted from the late 19th century to the 1930s. Graniteville is a district in Waterford that is named after this industry. The area today known as Crystal Mall was also home to granite quarries. Waterford's granite was used in many construction projects such as roads, the foundation for Fort Sumter, and the Statue of Liberty. Granite was replaced by concrete which slowly shrank the granite industry until the 1930s.

=== 20th century ===
During the 20th century, sheep farms were replaced by dairy farms. Between 1920 and 1960, there were about 100 dairy farms in Waterford. In addition, there were 10 to 100 head of cattle. Waterford also obtained its town seal in 1946. It was made by Martin Branner who was a cartoonist who also made the famous comic, Winnie Winkle. After World War II, Waterford boomed with development, adding new roads and buildings. In 1957, the first stop light was added in Waterford. In addition, the first retail center was built starting in 1960.

== Demographics ==
Historical population
Census	Pop.	Note	%±
1820	2,239		—
1850	2,259		—
1860	2,555		13.1%
1870	2,482		−2.9%
1880	2,701		8.8%
1890	2,661		−1.5%
1900	2,904		9.1%
1910	3,097		6.6%
1920	3,935		27.1%
1930	4,742		20.5%
1940	6,594		39.1%
1950	9,100		38.0%
1960	15,391		69.1%
1970	17,227		11.9%
1980	17,843		3.6%
1990	17,930		0.5%
2000	19,152		6.8%
2010	19,517		1.9%
2020	19,571		0.3%
U.S. Decennial Census

The town consists of a wide variety of rural and city living. At the 2010 census, there were 19,517 people in 8,005 households, including 5,335 families, in the town.

The population density was 584.7 inhabitants per square mile (225.8/km^{2}). There were 7,986 housing units at an average density of 243.8 per square mile (94.1/km^{2}).

The racial makeup of the town was 89.4% White, 2.5% African American, 0.5% Native American, 3.7% Asian, 0.1% Pacific Islander, 1.3% from other races, and 2.5% from two or more races. Hispanic or Latino of any race were 4.7% of the population.

There were 8,005 households, 26.4% had children under the age of 18 living with them, 53.0% were married couples living together, 9.2% had a female householder with no husband present, and 33.4% were non-families. 28.0% of households were made up of individuals, and 9.8% were one person aged 65 or older. The average household size was 2.38, and the average family size was 2.91.

The age distribution was 22.9% under the age of 20, 3.9% from 20 to 24, 21.3% from 25 to 44, 31.9% from 45 to 64, and 20.1% 65 or older. The median age was 46.1 years.

The median household income was $73,156 and the median family income was $93,933. The per capita income for the town was $114,645. About 3.1% of families and 5.4% of the population were below the poverty line, including 3.9% of those under age 18 and 6.9% of those age 65 or over.

=== Town center ===
At the 2010 census, there were 2,887 people in 1,327 households, including 732 families, in the Waterford census-designated place, comprising the town center.

The population density was 1,465.7 inhabitants per square mile (565.9/km^{2}). There were 1,379 housing units at an average density of 688.6 per square mile (265.9/km^{2}).

The racial makeup of the CDP was 87.8% White, 4.3% African American, 0.8% Native American, 2.9% Asian, 0.8% from other races, and 2.3% from two or more races. Hispanic or Latino of any race were 6.5% of the population.

There were 1,327 households, 20.4% had children under the age of 18 living with them, 39.5% were married couples living together, 11.5% had a female householder with no husband present, and 44.8% were non-families. 39.0% of households were made up of individuals, and 18.4% were one person aged 65 or older. The average household size was 2.11 and the average family size was 2.80.

The age distribution was 19.2% under the age of 20, 5.0% from 20 to 24, 4.1% from 25 to 44, 23.8% from 45 to 64, and 23.9% 65 or older. The median age was 46.7 years.

The median household income was $59,886 and the median family income was $69,543. The per capita income for the CDP was $71,509. About 4.6% of families and 7.7% of the population were below the poverty line, including 4.2% of those under age 18 and 20.4% of those age 65 or over.

== Education ==
Elementary schools appeared in 1915 when Quaker Hill School was built. Earlier, a lot was set aside for Quaker Hill in 1725 while the town was split into three districts: "Neck and Nehantick quarters," "West," and the "North East." Each district would end up getting split into even more individual districts. Later on, a second schoolhouse was replaced, built in 1858. Cohanzie School was built in 1923. It replaced four schools: Gilead School, "Peter Baker" located on far northern Vauxhall Street, Lakes Pond brick building, and Cohanzie predecessor. Cohanzie was later closed in 2009 by the Town of Waterford. There has been discussions of renovating the remains of the building into a senior home.

The town is served by Waterford High School.

A portion of Connecticut College property is in Waterford.

=== Jordan Schoolhouse ===
The earliest mention of a schoolhouse in Waterford was in 1737, known as the Jordan Schoolhouse, located on the Jordan Green. Farmers mainly wanted their children to be taught writing, reading, arithmetic, and religion. The Jordan School also influenced proper manners and obedience. Private lessons were of no need in Waterford, but were set up in the 19th century for those who had enough money to afford it. The Jordan School's last day of teaching was in the year 1979 with a final assembly. The Jordan School is still used but is held as a museum to the public.

== Government ==
=== Town Meeting ===
Waterford RTM membership after the 2025 municipal election

Waterford's local government is structured using a representative town meeting system. There are four elective districts in town, and each one sends one representative to the town meeting per every 550 electors in that area. As of 2025, districts 1 and 4 have seven representatives, district 2 has six representatives, and district 3 has eight, giving the Town Meeting a total of 28 elected members. In 2025, nineteen Democrats and nine Republicans were elected to the body.

As of the 2025 election results, the Representatives of the Waterford Town Meeting are:

District	Name	Party
1st	Kayla Mullen	Democrat
1st	JoAnna Bennett	Democrat
1st	Lindsay Khan	Democrat
1st	Ursula Moreshead	Democrat
1st	Narciss Greene	Democrat
1st	Danielle Steward-Gelinas	Republican
1st	Timothy Condon	Republican
2nd	Kristin Gonzalez	Democrat
2nd	Ted Olynciw	Democrat
2nd	Kyrah Augmon-Bossa	Democrat
2nd	Mary Childs	Democrat
2nd	Jim Bartelli	Republican
2nd	Kate MacKenzie	Republican
3rd	Tim Fioravanti	Democrat
3rd	Julie Watson Jones	Democrat
3rd	Kathy Mullen Kohl	Democrat
3rd	Tim Sullivan	Democrat
3rd	Guy Calkins	Democrat
3rd	Jennifer Antonino-Bracciale	Republican
3rd	Paul Goldstein	Republican
3rd	Steve Besade	Republican
4th	Susan Driscoll	Democrat
4th	Kathy Nunes Peterson	Democrat
4th	Emmy Franklin	Democrat
4th	Erica Casper	Democrat
4th	Ocean Pellett	Democrat
4th	Christina Jessuck	Republican
4th	David Sugrue	Republican

== Economy ==
Waterford's economic center is predominantly retail chains, including a variety of mini-malls and the Crystal Mall. There are several family-owned delicatessens and restaurants. Waterford is also home to JayPro Sports, which manufactures sports equipment for baseball, basketball, and tennis, and to Dominion's Millstone Nuclear Power Plant. The plant consists of three reactors, the first built between 1966 and 1970. While Millstone's first reactor is no longer in operation, the remaining two still provide power to a variety of towns in New England.

=== Top employers ===
Top employers in Waterford according to the town's 2023 Comprehensive Annual Financial Report

#	Employer	# of Employees
1	Dominion Nuclear Plant	1,650
2	Town of Waterford	595
3	Waterford Hotel Group	568
4	Walmart	497
5	Sonalysts Inc.	486
6	Home Depot	200
7	Bayview Healthcare Center	200
8	Lowes	119
9	BJ's Wholesale Club	112
10	Coca-Cola	120

== Attractions ==
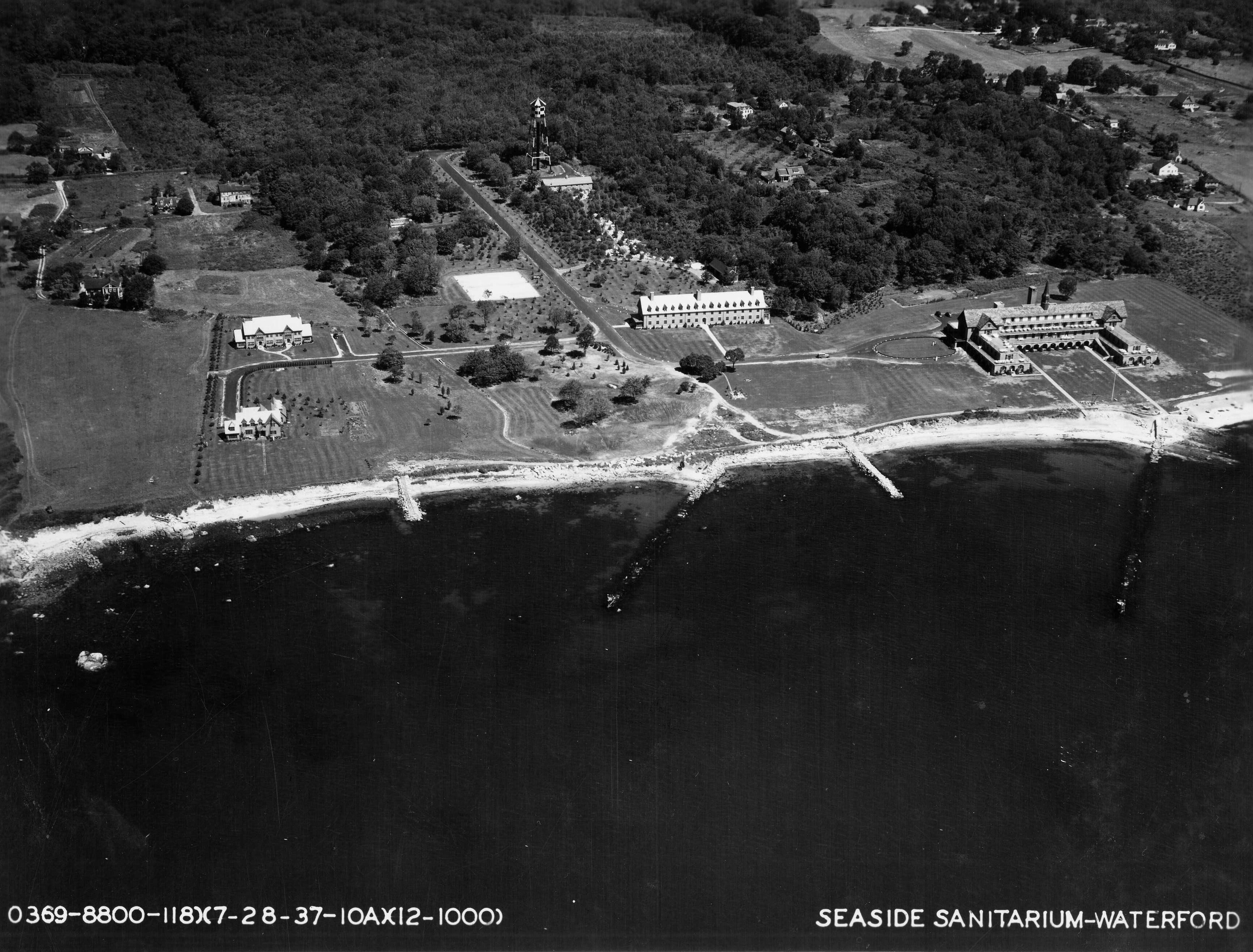
Seaside Sanatorium, 1937

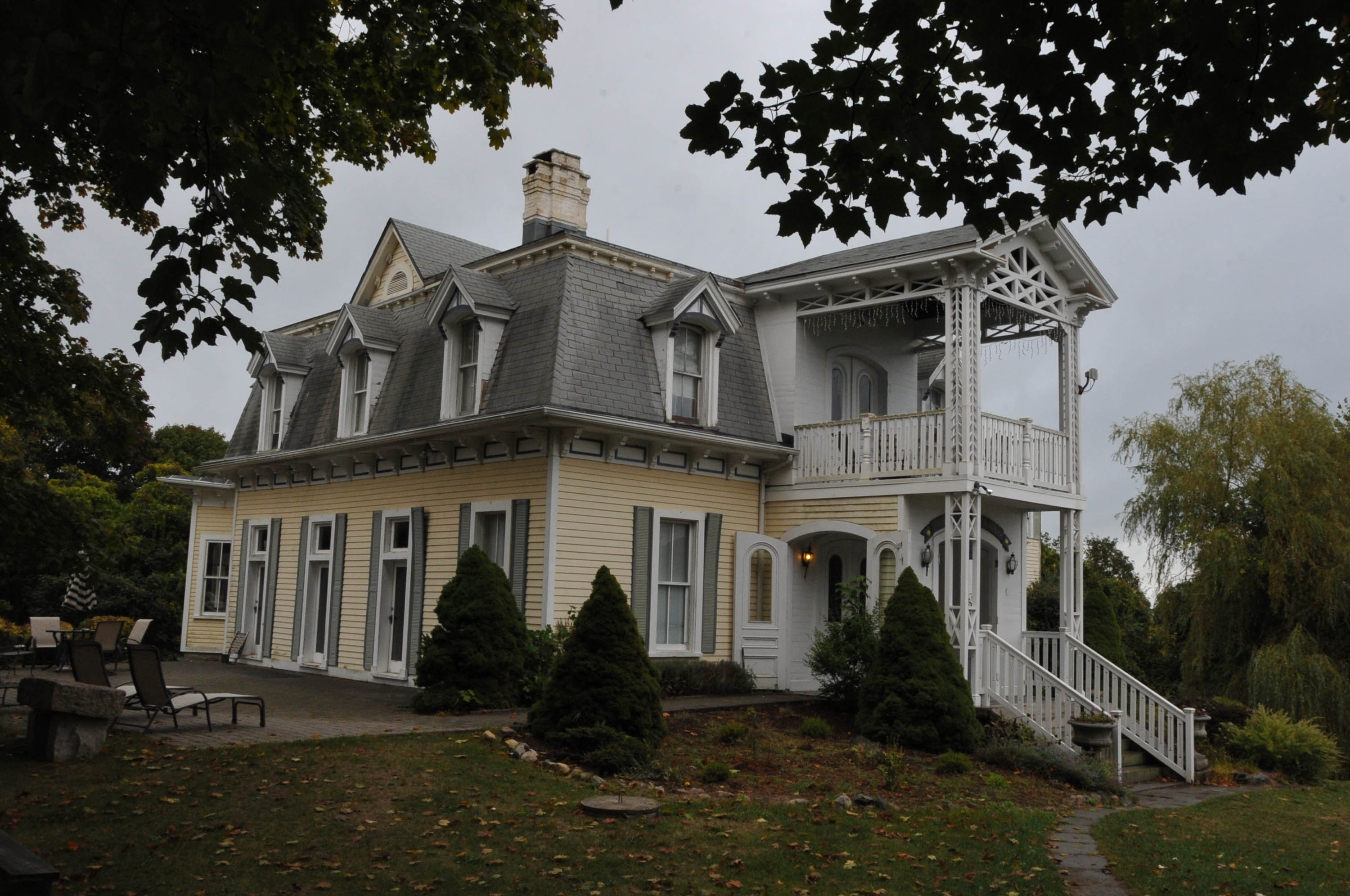
The Eugene O'Neill Theater Center, opened in 1964.

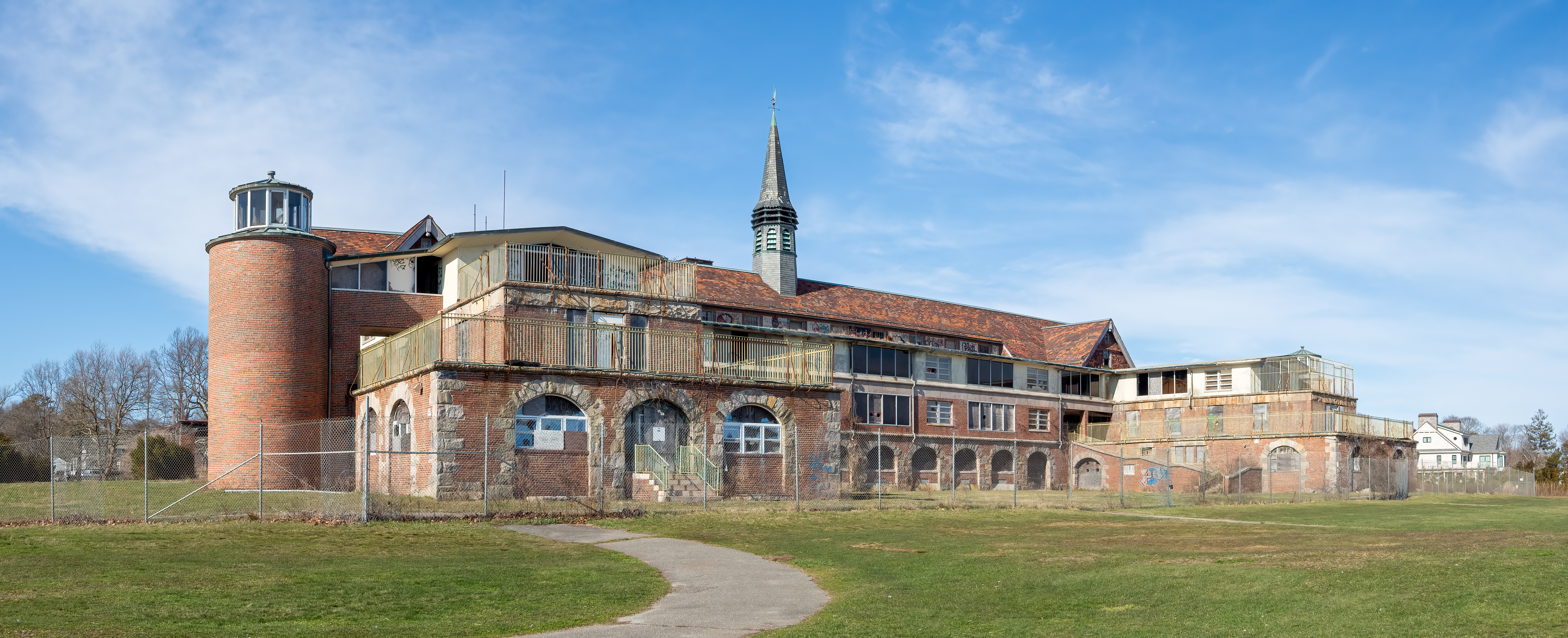
The Seaside Sanitorium, built in 1934.

- Mago Point is an area in Waterford that is home to many marine businesses.
- The Connecticut College Arboretum is a 750-acre (3.0 km^{2}) arboretum and botanical garden which lies partially within Quaker Hill, a neighborhood of Waterford.
- The Eugene O'Neill Theater Center is located in Waterford, as is the Intentional Theatre.
- Waterford Beach
- Harkness Memorial State Park is a recreational area that provides a picturesque view of Long Island Sound. The park features the former mansion, gardens and grounds of Edward Harkness, who bought the property in 1907. Adjacent to the Harkness Memorial State Park is Camp Harkness for the Handicapped, a summer facility for children and adults with physical and/or mental disabilities. Most of what is now Camp Harkness for the Handicapped was once a golf course.
- The Waterford Speedbowl is a racetrack that first opened in 1951 by local businessmen and although it has changed ownership several times since, is still in operation today.
- In 2009, Waterford was the home of the game show Deal or No Deal, which was filmed at Sonalyst Studios.
- The Seaside Sanatorium continues to be considered prime real estate in Waterford, being a 36-acre (0.15 km^{2}) shoreline property, located on the original parcel of 11 Magonk Pt. The property was designed by architect Cass Gilbert. The Sanatorium opened in 1934 to treat patients suffering from tuberculosis by using heliotherapy, until 1958 when patients relocated to Uncas on the Thames and it later became a Geriatric Hospital, which opened in 1959–1961. In 1961, the Sanatorium opened to treat people with Developmental Disabilities, staying open until 1996.

== Emergency services ==
=== Police department ===
The Waterford Police Department has 47 officers on active duty. "The Waterford Police Department, commanded by Chief Marc Balestracci, also has a Board of Police Commissioners. The rest of the department consists of Lieutenants, Sergeants, Patrol Officers, K-9 Officers, Detectives, Traffic Officer, Evidence/Court Officer, School Resource Officers and civilian Community Service Officers."

==== Crime ====
According to 2012 statistics, the crime rate in Waterford is below average compared to most cities in the United States.

===== Statistics =====
The murder rate for Waterford is 5.1 per 100,000 with one murder occurring in 2012. 6 robberies occurred as well as 38 assaults. In 2012, 55 burglaries, 451 thefts and 9 auto thefts occurred.

=== Fire service ===
The Town of Waterford is protected by a combination volunteer and career fire service, consisting of five fire companies located throughout the town.

=== Ambulance service ===
Ambulance service for the town is provided by Waterford Ambulance. The Waterford Ambulance Service (WAS) is a non-profit ambulance service providing emergency medical care to the residents and visitors of the Town of Waterford, Connecticut and surrounding communities with emergency medical services and ambulance transportation in accordance with established Federal and State laws and regulations.

== Notable people ==
- Veronica Ballestrini, country music singer/songwriter
- Mike Burrows (baseball), professional baseball pitcher for the Pittsburgh Pirates
- Malia DelaCruz, indie rock musician who performs as CIAO MALZ
- Billy Gardner, baseball player, manager and coach
- Sara Juli, modern dancer and choreographer
- Jan Merrill, Olympic runner, first American woman to run the mile finals
