= Graniteville Historic District =

Graniteville Historic District may refer to:

- Graniteville Historic District (Waterford, Connecticut), listed on the NRHP in Connecticut
- Graniteville Historic District (Westford, Massachusetts), listed on the NRHP in Massachusetts
- Graniteville Historic District (South Carolina), listed on the NRHP in South Carolina
