= Mago Point, Waterford, Connecticut =

Coordinates: 41.3255°N 72.1756°W

Mago Point (/ˈmeɪɡoʊ/) is a location in Waterford, Connecticut. It was originally owned by the building company Titus and Bishop, who planned to make it into many 25 x 100-foot lots. Before these owners acted on their plans, Earl and Doris Wadsworth bought them out. Now it is home to several marine businesses.

== Attractions ==
Mago Point is home to the following businesses:

=== Outboard Exchange LLC ===
Outboard Exchange has been in business for over 30 years remanufacturing and servicing outboard motors.

=== The Dock Restaurant ===
The Dock Restaurant serves seafood and fried pickles.

=== The Sunbeam Fleet ===
The Sunbeam Fleet is a sport fishing dock with a fleet of fishing boats. They have been open for over 75 years.

=== Mago Point Marina ===
Mago Point Marina is a boat marina.

=== Hillyers Bait and Tackle ===
Hillyers Bait and Tackle is a fishing supply shop.

=== Mago Point Packy ===
Mago Point Packy is a package store.

=== Niantic Bay Boathouse ===
This is a rack storage facility, boating store and a service center.
