= Post Hill Historic District =

Historic district in Connecticut, United States

- U.S. National Register of Historic Places
- U.S. Historic district
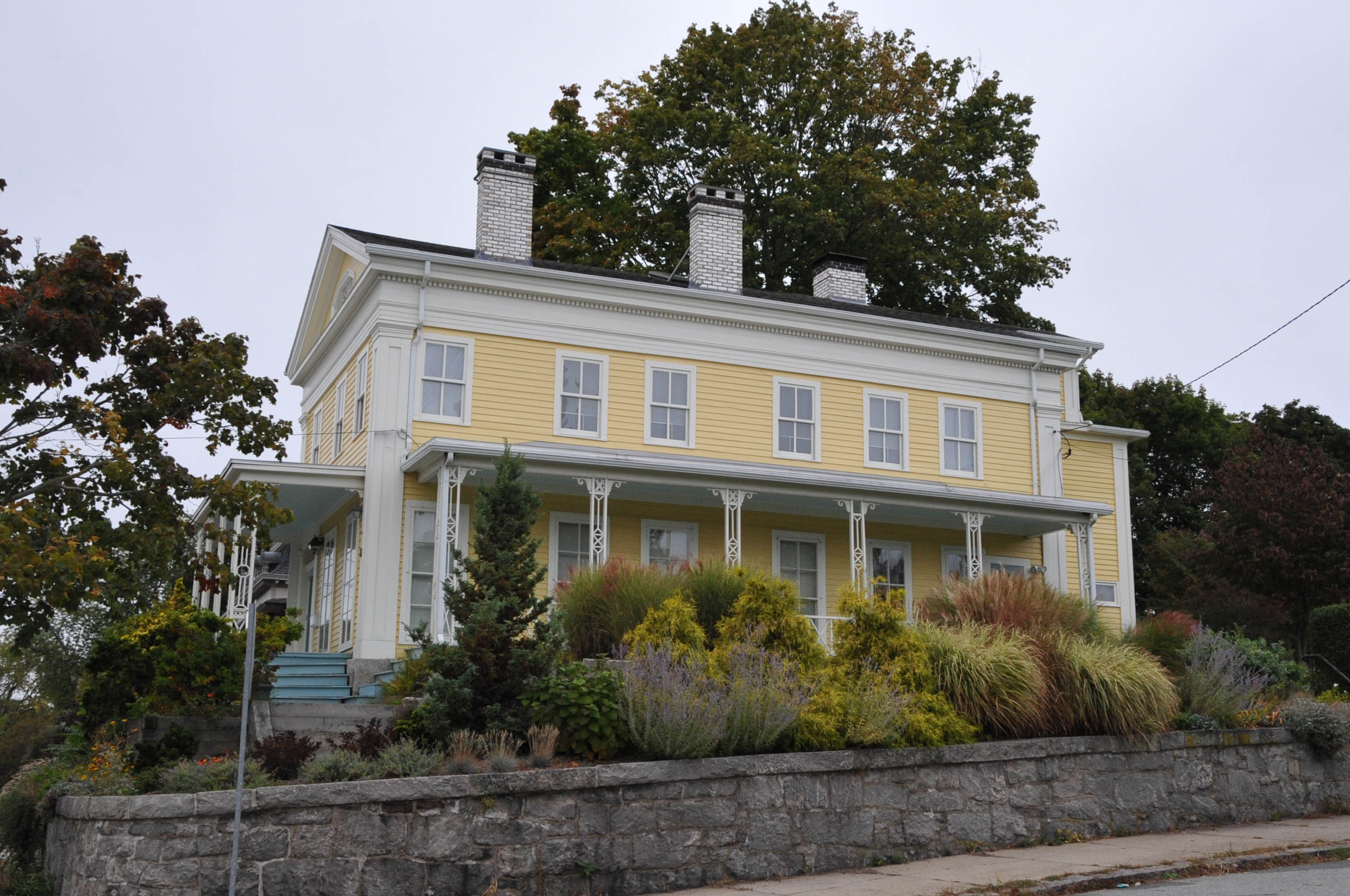

- Location within Connecticut Location within the United States
- Location: Roughly bounded by Broad, Center, Vauxhall, Berkeley, Fremont and Walker Streets, New London, Connecticut
- Coordinates: 41°21′37″N 72°6′17″W
- Area: 58 acres (23 ha)
- Architectural style: Second Empire, Queen Anne, Italianate
- NRHP reference No.: 93000812
- Added to NRHP: August 5, 1993

The Post Hill Historic District encompasses the oldest settled area of New London, Connecticut.

== Description ==
Post Hill Historic District is located just west of its commercial and civic center, the district is on high ground with a commanding view of the Thames River to the east. The roadways that run through the district include Channing, Vauxhall, and Granite Streets. Most of the districts more than 200 buildings were built much later, between about 1840 and 1925, even though it is home to the Antientest Burial Ground, the city's first cemetery (c. 1650). Williams Park, the southernmost point in the district was laid out in 1858, and was a significant spur to the area's growth. The houses in the district are in a wide variety of styles, but tend to be of similar scale and setting. The district includes the Nathan A. Woodworth House, previously listed on the National Register. The district was listed on the National Register of Historic Places on August 5, 1993.

New London was settled in 1645 by English colonists led by John Winthrop Jr. Post Hill, named for Richard Post, an early landowner, was where the town's civic center was laid out at that time. In addition to the cemetery (the only element of the early settlement period to survive), land was allocated for a meeting house. The area's major roads also date to this early settlement period: Williams Street ran from the town center to a mill, and Vauxhall Street was the main road to Colchester. The economic importance of the waterfront rapidly came to dominate, and the town's civic center moved near to it by the mid-18th century. Post Hill retained a rural character until the mid-19th century, when pressure for residential housing near the city center prompted its development. Thomas Fitch, a prominent local businessman, acquired much of the land in the area and platted streets for residential development. The area was mostly built out by the late 19th century, with only a small number of plots built out in the early 20th century.

== Gallery ==
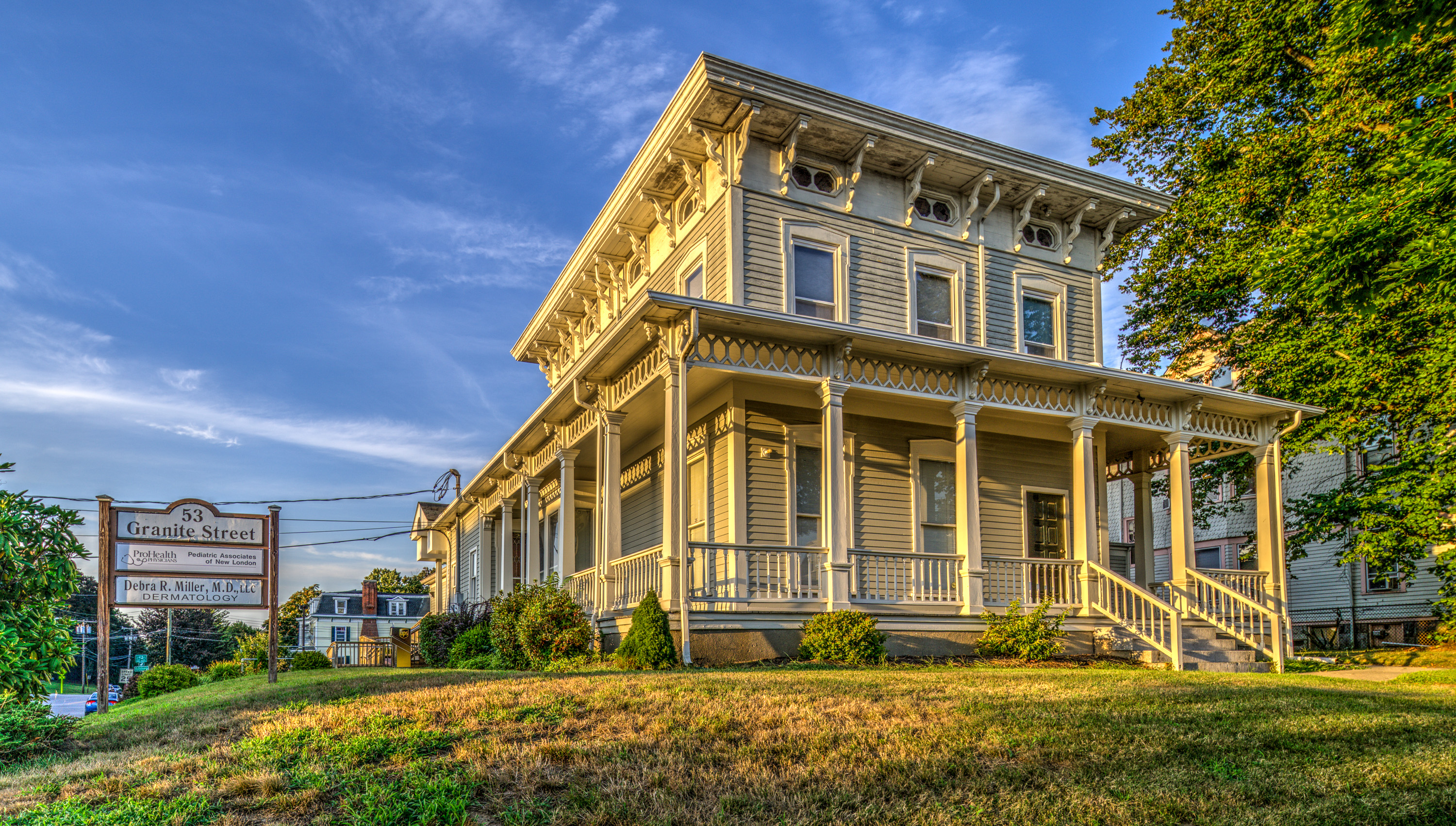
A historic home on Granite Street is now a doctor's office

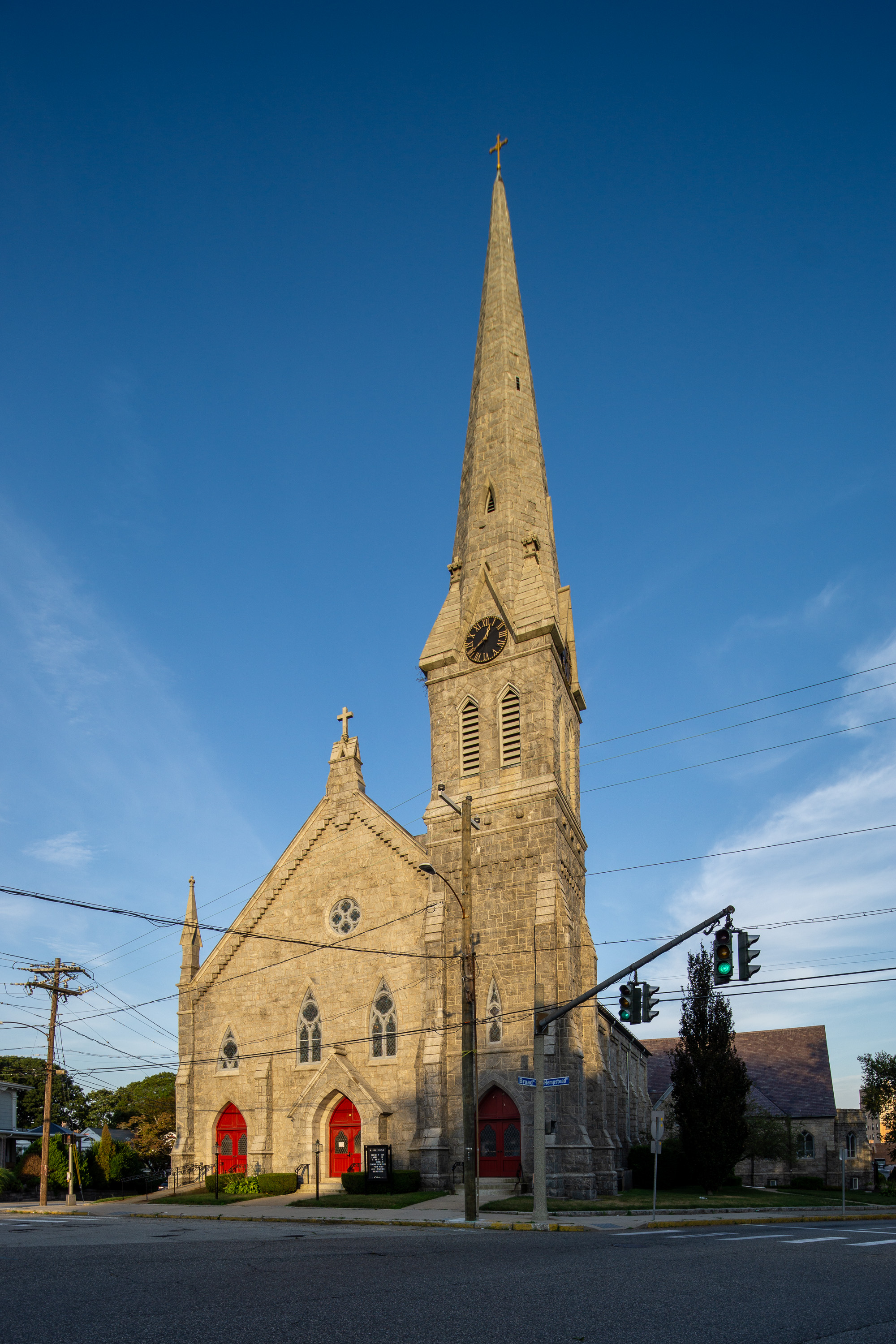
Former Second Congregational Church, 45 Broad Street

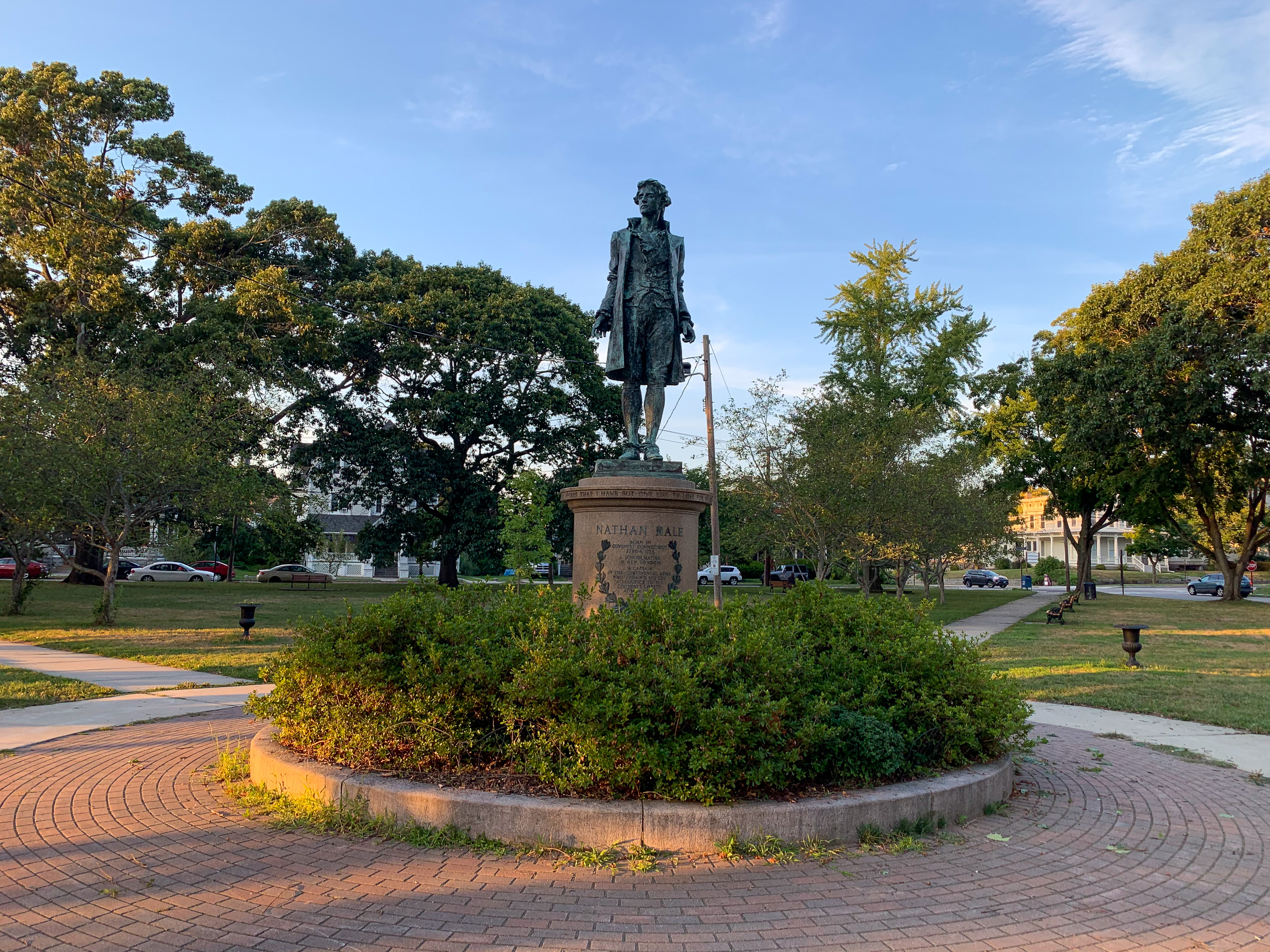
Williams Park

== See also ==
- National Register of Historic Places listings in New London County, Connecticut
