= First Congregational Free Church =

Historic church in New York, United States

- U.S. National Register of Historic Places
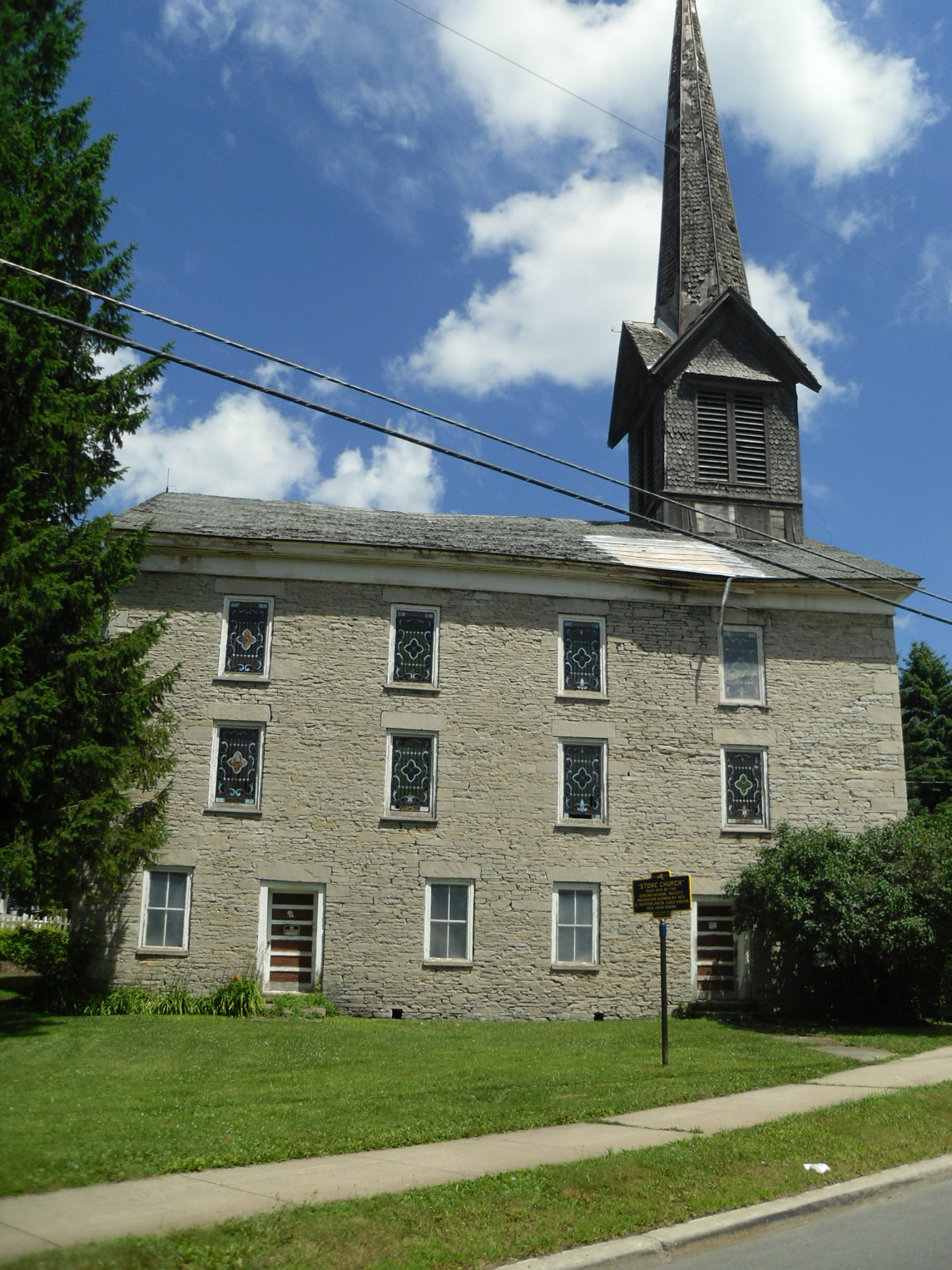
- First Congregational Free Church, July 2010

- Location within New York Location within the United States
- Location: 177 N. Main St., Oriskany Falls, New York
- Coordinates: 42°56′25″N 75°27′38″W
- Area: 0.4 acres (0.16 ha)
- Built: 1833-1845
- NRHP reference No.: 79001609
- Added to NRHP: January 25, 1979

First Congregational Free Church is a historic church at 177 N. Main Street in Oriskany Falls, Oneida County, New York. It is a limestone structure started in 1833 and completed in 1845. It features a low gable roof surmounted by a tower consisting of a belfry and slender spire.

The Congregation was founded in 1825 to meet the growing need for a dedicated place of worship in the town of Oriskany Falls. The construction of the church was overseen by a committee of prominent community members, including John Thompson and William Adams. Architect James Monroe was commissioned to design the church, which was constructed in the Greek Revival architectural style.

During the Civil War era, the Limestone Church became a hub of support for the war efforts. The congregation actively participated in fundraising initiatives and organized aid for soldiers and their families. The church provided solace and comfort to the community during this challenging period.

Over the years, the Limestone Church has undergone modifications and preservation efforts to ensure its longevity. In the late 19th century, a rear addition was constructed to accommodate Sunday school classrooms and community gatherings. The church's interior was also enhanced with decorative elements, including stained glass windows and intricate woodwork.

It was listed on the National Register of Historic Places in 1979.
