= Crystal Mall (Connecticut) =

Defunct mall in Waterford, Connecticut, U.S.

Coordinates: 41.3745°N 72.1440°W

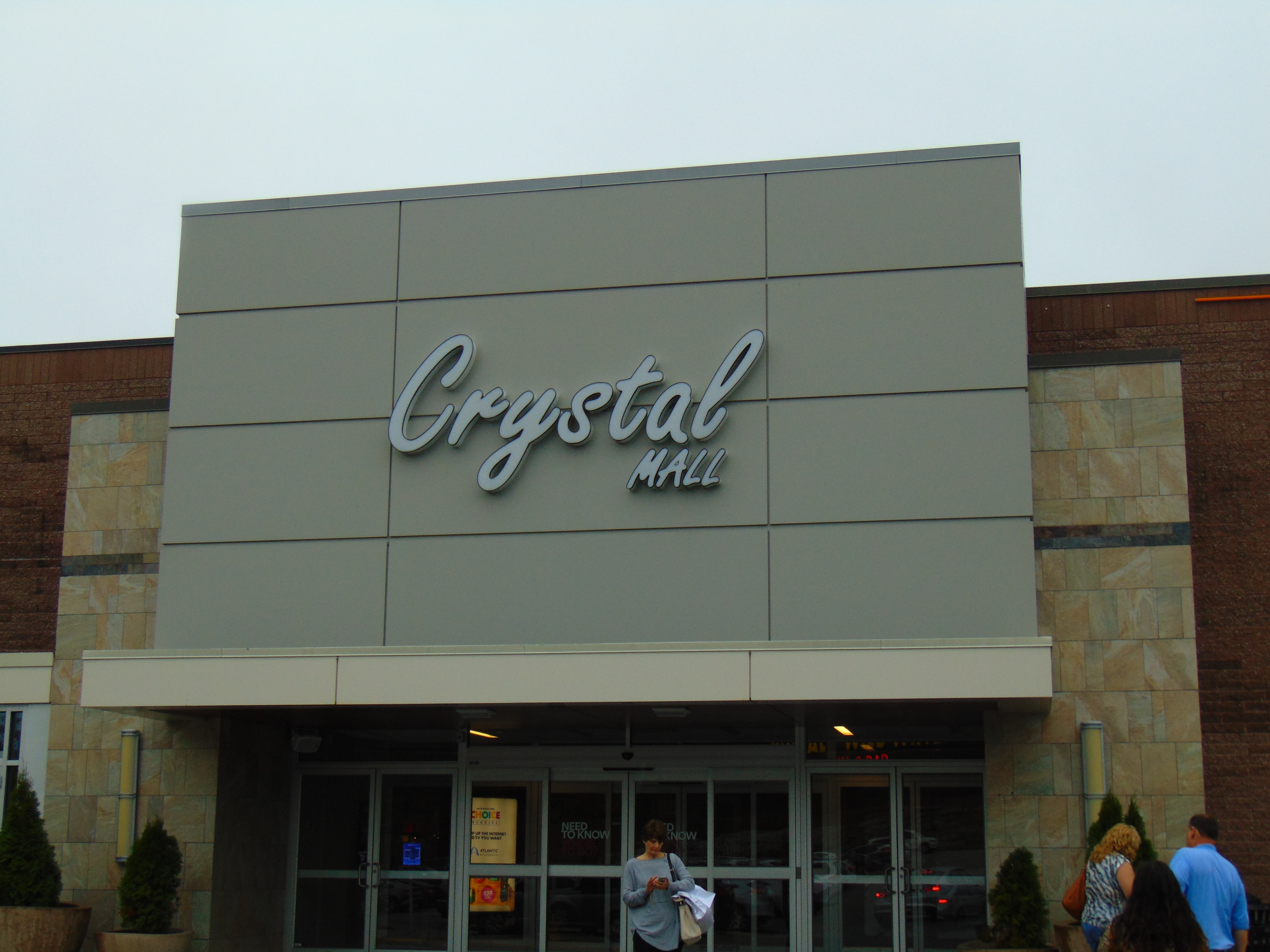
- Entrance to the mall, 2017
- Location: Waterford, Connecticut, U.S.
- Address: 850 Hartford Turnpike
- Opened: September 30, 1984; 42 years ago
- Closed: March 31, 2026; 7 months ago
- Developer: New England Development Corp.
- Manager: General Dynamics Electric Boat
- Owner: General Dynamics Electric Boat
- Num. of stores: 103
- Num. of anchor tenants: 5 (all vacant)
- Floor area: 782,786 sq ft (72,723 m^{2})
- Floors: 2
- Parking: 3,000

Crystal Mall was an enclosed, two-level regional mall in Waterford, Connecticut. It was situated in a central retail area off the Hartford Turnpike (Route 85), across from a smaller, open-air shopping center, Waterford Commons. The mall covered a gross leaseable area of 782,786 sq ft (72,723 m^{2}), making it Connecticut's ninth largest mall, which once boasted 110 shops. Its primary trade area included a trade population of 296,161 people, mostly serving the nearby towns of Waterford, Stonington, Norwich, Groton and New London. The mall had 5 anchor stores, all of which were vacant at the time of its closure. These anchors included Sears, JCPenney, Jordan Marsh (later Macy's) and Filene's (later Bed Bath & Beyond and Christmas Tree Shops).

== History ==
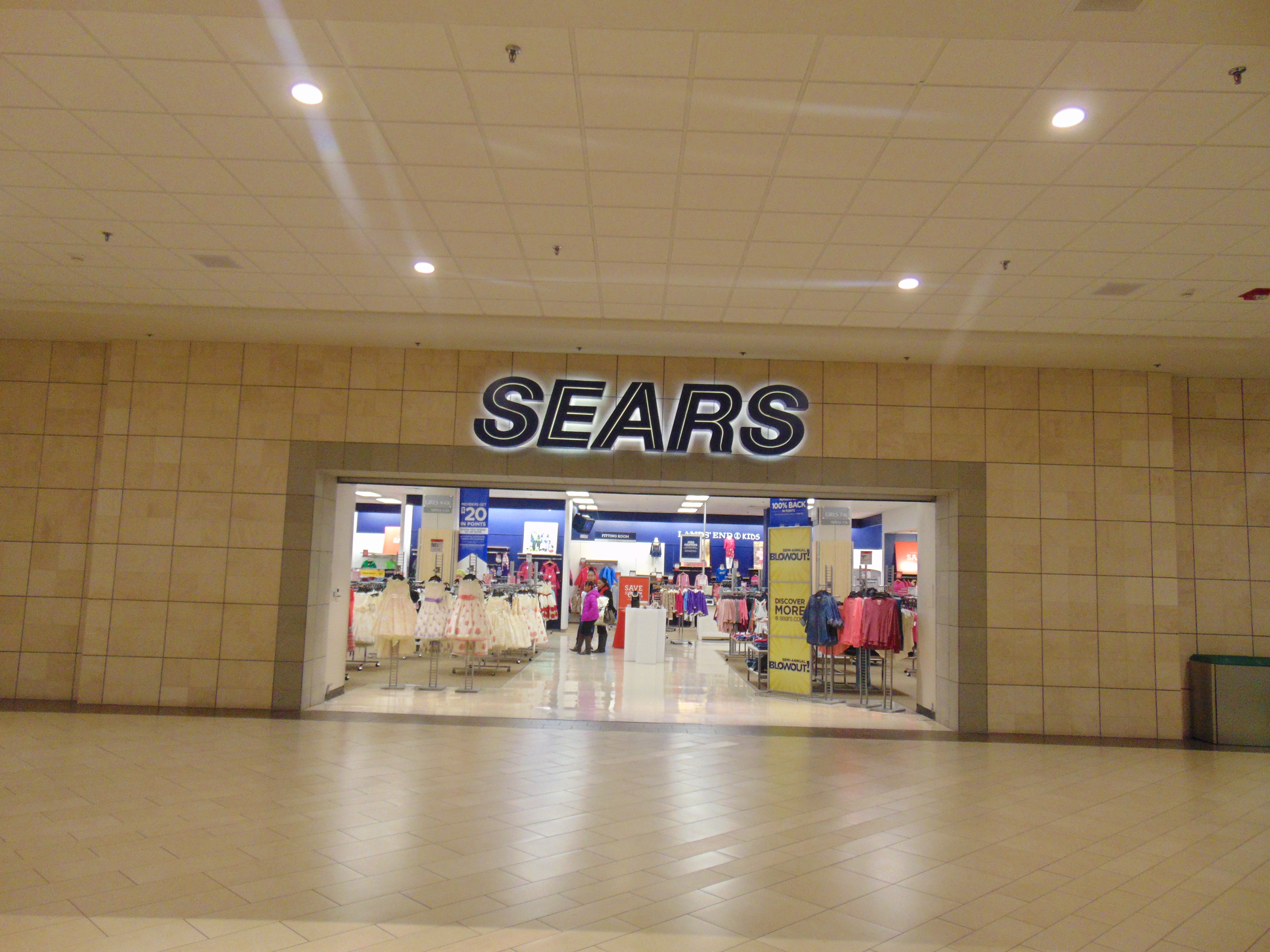
The original tenant Sears at the mall.

The mall was developed in 1984 by New England Development. When it opened on September 30, 1984, it was the only regional mall in the area, and many smaller shopping centers faced strong competition. Some, like nearby New London Mall, were eventually forced to change strategies, such as becoming a "lifestyle center". The original anchors were Sears, JCPenney, Filene's, and Jordan Marsh. Jordan Marsh became Macy's in 1996.

After about 10 years in operation, Crystal Mall's look was becoming outdated, and management realized it needed to be renewed. In 1997, the mall underwent a renovation to upgrade its interior design. The previous dark color scheme was replaced by a brighter white, the food court was remodeled, and lighting as well as other fixtures were improved. The massive center chandelier was slated to be removed during the renovations, but the fixture was popular with shoppers, so it was shined and has remained. The mall has still been criticized for its aging exterior look, and for not updating its tenants to keep up with the times.

On October 8, 2000, a Target store would officially open to the public outside the mall. An Olive Garden restaurant then opened in the surrounding area on June 21, 2004.

In 2006, one of the mall's longstanding anchors Filene's closed its store, as this was one of a number of New England Malls that had both a Macy's and Filene's. After the May Co Department Store Company was purchased by Federated Department Stores (now renamed Macy's, Inc.) duplicate stores were closed at many New England malls. In 2007, it was announced that two anchors would backfill the original Filene's, those two anchors being Christmas Tree Shops and Bed Bath & Beyond. Both retailers opened a few months later in early 2008, with Christmas Tree Shops on the first level, and Bed Bath & Beyond on the second level.

A Buffalo Wild Wings restaurant opened inside the mall on November 20, 2011.

=== Decline and redevelopment ===
The Sears anchor store closed in January 2019.

On January 6, 2021, Macy's announced their anchor store would close by March 21. On November 1, 2021, it was reported that the building had been sold to a development firm.

Simon Property Group placed the Crystal Mall in Waterford, CT, into special servicing around late 2021, eventually handing it back to the lender as part of broader actions on struggling properties, with General Dynamics Electric Boat acquiring the property in late 2025 to convert it into an office campus, effectively marking the end of its retail life and marking a significant shift for the property from SPG's portfolio. Crystal Mall ranked last in Simon Property Group's portfolio at the time, which, upon sending to special servicing, immediately increased their portfolio numbers due to Crystal Mall dragging down their bottom line.

The Bed Bath & Beyond store closed in January 2023, as the chain filed for bankruptcy and ceased operations.

The Christmas Tree Shops store closed in August 2023, following the chain's bankruptcy that June.

JCPenney closed on May 25, 2024, leaving the mall with no anchors and cementing its status as a dead mall.

On June 25, 2025, it was announced that General Dynamics Electric Boat would occupy the former Macy's location, to expand the company's engineering, training and laboratory work in support of Columbia-class Submarine and Virginia-class submarine production. Electric Boat has its shipyard and headquarters less than 6 miles from Crystal Mall in Groton, CT. In October 2025, General Dynamics Electric Boat acquired the entire property from Namdar, with the exception of the former Sears. Electric Boat plans to occupy a significant portion of the property with plans to create around a 16,000 new jobs by hiring 8,000 new employees in 2027 and another 8,000 in 2028. On November 18, 2025, Electric Boat purchased the former Sears, the final piece to complete the transition of the mall to being under Electric Boat's full ownership.

Crystal Mall closed permanently on March 31, 2026, as General Dynamics prepared to undergo their planned facility renovations and maintenance, starting with the former Sears building.
