= Graniteville Historic District (Waterford, Connecticut) =

Historic district in Connecticut, United States

- U.S. National Register of Historic Places
- U.S. Historic district
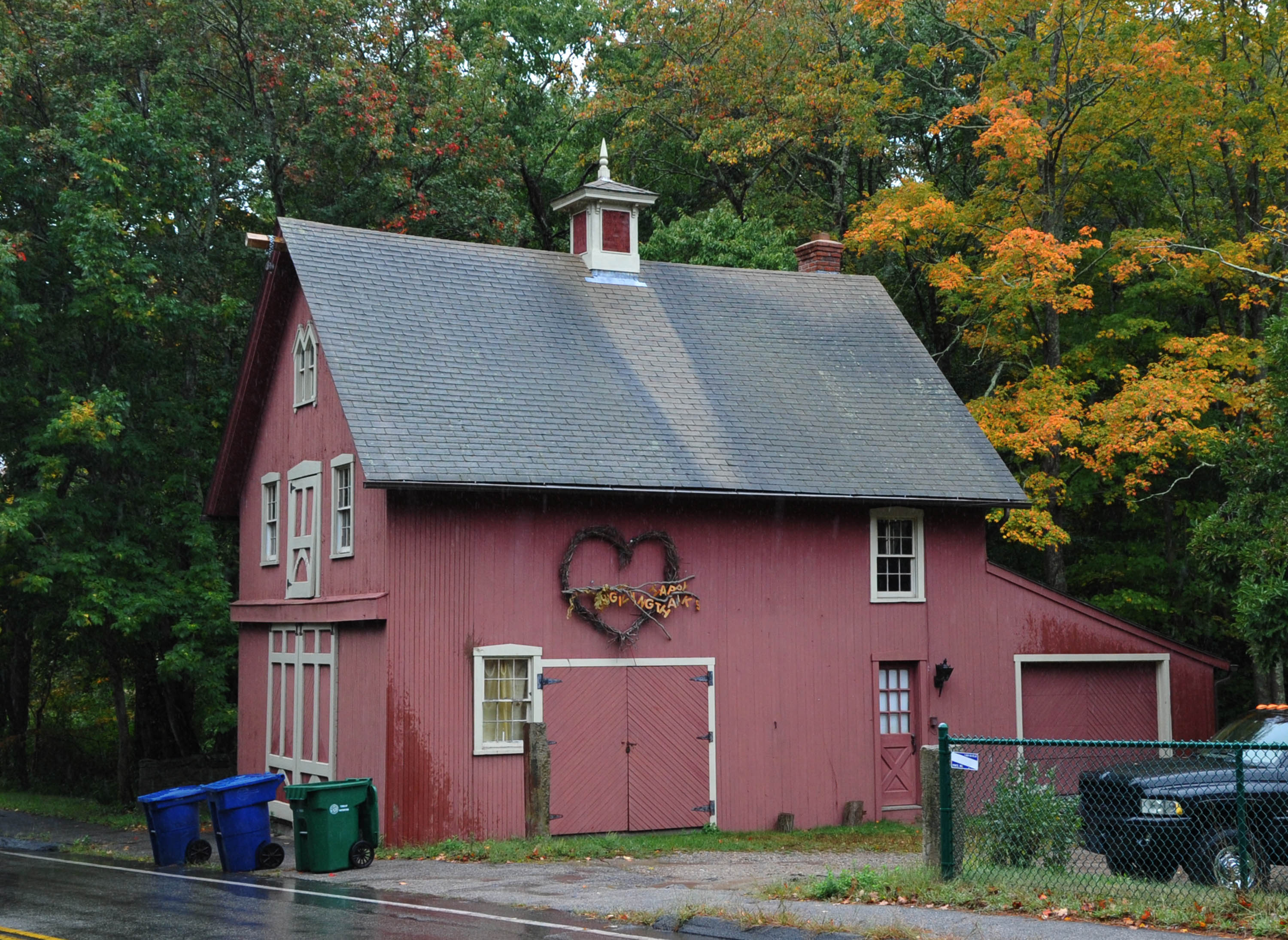
- Barn on Rope Ferry Road

- Location within Connecticut Location within the United States
- Location: Rope Ferry Road, Waterford, Connecticut
- Coordinates: 41°20′6″N 72°9′13″W
- Area: 25 acres (10 ha)
- NRHP reference No.: 03000812
- Added to NRHP: August 28, 2003

The Graniteville Historic District is a mainly residential historic district in Waterford, Connecticut, United States. It is ranged along Rope Ferry Road, near granite quarries that were once a major industry in the town. Most of the 31 historical buildings in the district are plain residences occupied by quarry workers; also included are the c. 1878 Graniteville School at 239 Rope Ferry Road, and the house of John Palmer, one of the proprietors of the quarries, at 218 Rope Ferry Road. His house, a c. 1860 Italianate updating of an older house, is the most elaborate house in the district. The district was listed on the National Register of Historic Places in 2003.

== Description and history ==
Waterford was settled in the 17th century, and was part of New London until 1801. Its industrial history as a granite quarrying locale began as early as 1737, when Edward Buor began quarrying stones for use in grist mills. The site of his quarry, which operated into the mid-20th century, became known as Millstone Point, and is where the Millstone Nuclear Power Plant is now located. Granite quarrying became a larger business in the 19th century, and was the town's largest non-agricultural industry. The Graniteville community arose in the 1840s and 1850s as a cluster of housing for quarry workers along Rope Ferry Road, which was then the major east-west road between New London and Lyme.

The historic district consists of three discontiguous sections. Two of these are abandoned quarries, located west and northwest of the built village. The latter extends along Rope Ferry Road roughly from Spithead Road to Gardiners Wood Road. Most of the houses are architecturally vernacular expressions of the Greek Revival, with the house of John Palmer its most distinctive example of the Italianate style. The Graniteville School is also Italianate, and there are several example of Carpenter Gothic architecture, including in the barn at 227 Rope Ferry Road.

== See also ==
- National Register of Historic Places listings in New London County, Connecticut
