= Whitestown, New York =

- Town
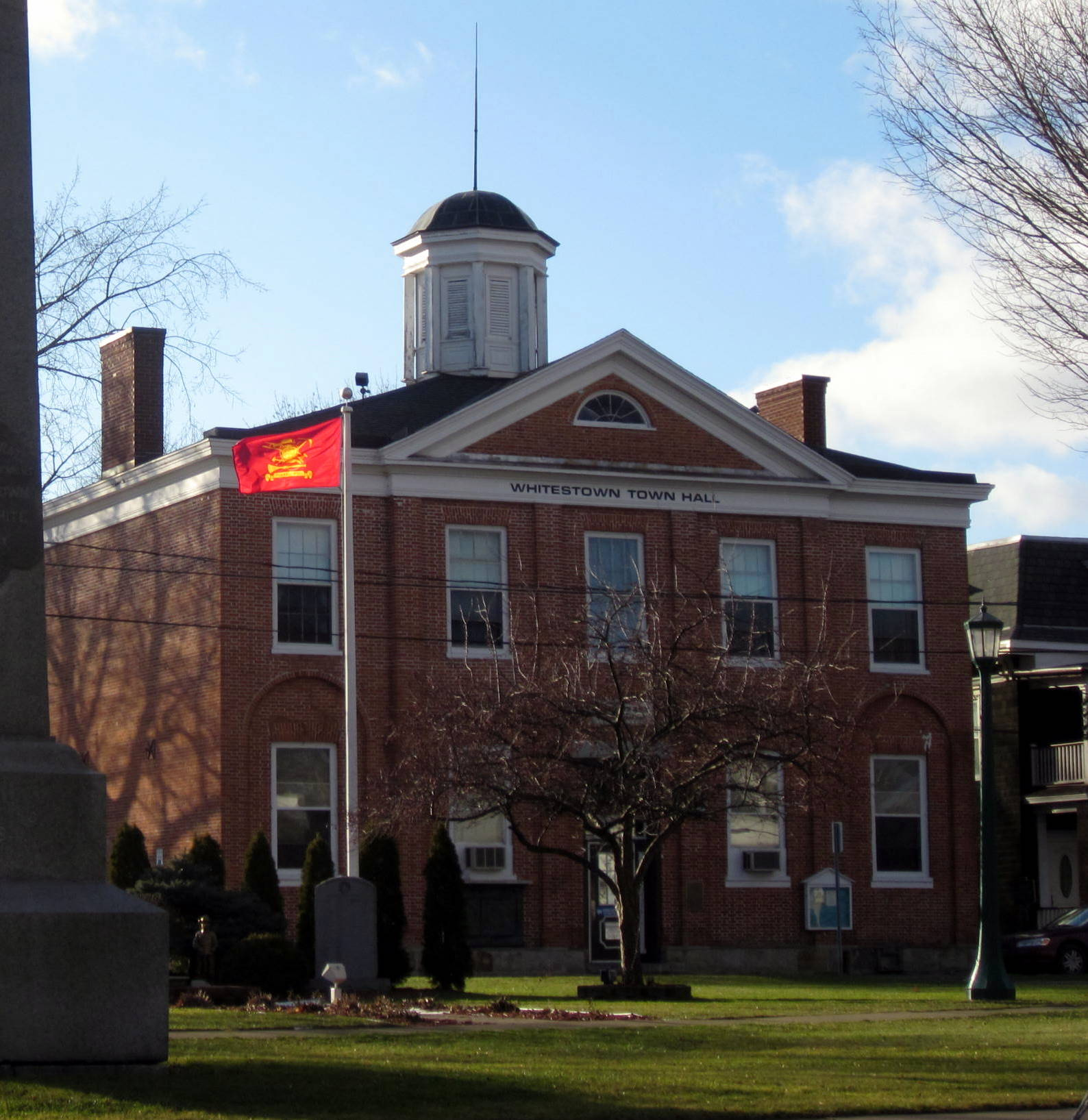
- Whitestown Town Hall

- Seal

- Location in Oneida County and the state of New York.
- Coordinates: 43°07′24″N 75°22′35″W
- Country: United States
- State: New York
- County: Oneida

Government
  - Type: Town Council
  - Town Supervisor: Shaun J Kaleta ()

Area
  - Total: 27.32 sq mi (70.76 km^{2})
  - Land: 27.32 sq mi (70.75 km^{2})
  - Water: 0 sq mi (0.00 km^{2})
- Elevation: 479 ft (146 m)

Population (2010)
  - Total: 18,667
  - Estimate (2016): 18,474
  - Density: 676/sq mi (261.1/km^{2})
- Time zone: UTC-5 (Eastern (EST))
  - Summer (DST): UTC-4 (EDT)
- ZIP Codes: 13424 (Oriskany); 13492 (Whitesboro); 13417 (New York Mills); 13495 (Yorkville); 13440 (Rome)
- Area code: 315
- FIPS code: 36-81754
- GNIS feature ID: 0979638
- Website: Town of Whitestown

Whitestown is a town in Oneida County, New York, United States. The population was 18,667 at the 2010 census. The name is derived from Judge Hugh White, an early settler. The town is immediately west of Utica and the New York State Thruway (Interstate 90) passes across the town.

== History ==
The town, part of the Sadaquada Patent, was settled in 1784. The Town of Whitestown was formed in 1788, before the creation of Oneida County, with a size of 12 million acres (49,000 km^{2}; 19,000 mi^{2}). Whitestown was founded by Hugh White after he scouted the land in 1784 by way of traveling the Mohawk River. On June 5, 1784, White and his family came upon the mouth of the Sauquoit Creek and settled in the forests that would become Whitestown. White was also the forerunner for the creation of Oneida County in the 1790s.

Whitestown is known as the "Mother of Towns" because of the many towns and counties formed from its expanse. The Town of Paris and the Town of Steuben were formed from Whitestown in 1792. The Town of Cazenovia was formed in 1793. The Town of Augusta was formed in 1798. Utica was formed in 1817. The Town of New Hartford was formed from Whitestown in 1827.

The Oneida Institute, the first racially integrated educational institution in the United States, operated in Whitesboro from 1827 to 1843.

Although the old Whitestown Town Hall is in the village of Whitesboro, the current town offices are in the town of Whitestown outside of Whitesboro.

== Geography ==
According to the United States Census Bureau, the town has a total area of 27.2 square miles (70 km^{2}), of which 27.2 square miles (70 km^{2}) is land and 0.04% is water.

The town is west of the City of Utica and the northern border is defined by the Mohawk River.

Oriskany Creek flows northward through the town to the Mohawk River.

== Demographics ==
Historical population
Census	Pop.	Note	%±
1790	1,891		—
1800	4,212		122.7%
1810	4,912		16.6%
1820	5,219		6.3%
1830	4,419		−15.3%
1840	5,156		16.7%
1850	5,820		12.9%
1860	4,367		−25.0%
1870	4,339		−0.6%
1880	4,498		3.7%
1890	5,155		14.6%
1900	6,235		21.0%
1910	7,798		25.1%
1920	10,183		30.6%
1930	11,818		16.1%
1940	11,580		−2.0%
1950	12,686		9.6%
1960	19,185		51.2%
1970	21,382		11.5%
1980	20,150		−5.8%
1990	18,985		−5.8%
2000	18,635		−1.8%
2010	18,667		0.2%
2020	18,118		−2.9%
2022 (est.)	17,870		−1.4%
U.S. Decennial Census

As of the census of 2000, there were 18,635 people, 7,544 households, and 5,024 families living in the town. The population density was 685.2 inhabitants per square mile (264.6/km^{2}). There were 7,945 housing units at an average density of 292.1 units per square mile (112.8 units/km^{2}). The racial makeup of the town was 97.27% White, 1.18% African American, 0.09% Native American, 0.48% Asian, 0.01% Pacific Islander, 0.28% from other races, and 0.69% from two or more races. Hispanic or Latino of any race were 1.32% of the population.

There were 7,544 households, out of which 28.8% had children under the age of 18 living with them, 52.1% were married couples living together, 11.2% had a female householder with no husband present, and 33.4% were non-families. 29.3% of all households were made up of individuals, and 14.8% had someone living alone who was 65 years of age or older. The average household size was 2.39 and the average family size was 2.96.

In the town, the population was spread out, with 22.8% under the age of 18, 7.3% from 18 to 24, 27.4% from 25 to 44, 23.9% from 45 to 64, and 18.5% who were 65 years of age or older. The median age was 40 years. For every 100 females, there were 93.2 males. For every 100 females age 18 and over, there were 90.0 males.

The median income for a household in the town was $40,084, and the median income for a family was $49,798. Males had a median income of $36,553 versus $24,942 for females. The per capita income for the town was $19,507. About 7.0% of families and 9.1% of the population were below the poverty line, including 14.7% of those under age 18 and 9.6% of those age 65 or over.

== Places of interest ==
- Mohawk Airlines, until its dissolution, had its headquarters on the grounds of Oneida County Airport in Whitestown.
- Summit Park, A theme park located in Oriskany, New York. It had rides, circuses, and animals; but once people had greater means to travel to other theme parks, like Sylvan Beach; the park closed in 1926.

== Communities and locations in Whitestown ==
=== Villages of Whitestown ===
Below are the villages and hamlets of Whitestown.

- Oriskany – The Village of Oriskany is near the northern town line.
- New York Mills – The Village of New York Mills is southeast of Yorkville, adjacent to Utica.
- Whitesboro – The Village of Whitesboro is in the eastern part of the town, south of the Thruway.
- Yorkville – The Village of Yorkville, located on Route 5A, lies between Utica and Whitesboro.
- Walesville – A hamlet in the southwestern part of the town.
- Coleman Mills – A hamlet south of Oriskany and north of the Thruway.
- Dunham Manor – A location south of Whitesboro.
- Glenhaven – A location by the southern town line.
- Herthum Heights – A location northwest of Whitesboro.
- Herthum Hills – A location west of Whitesboro.
- Sunset Manor – A location northwest of Whitesboro.
