= Augusta, New York =

- Town
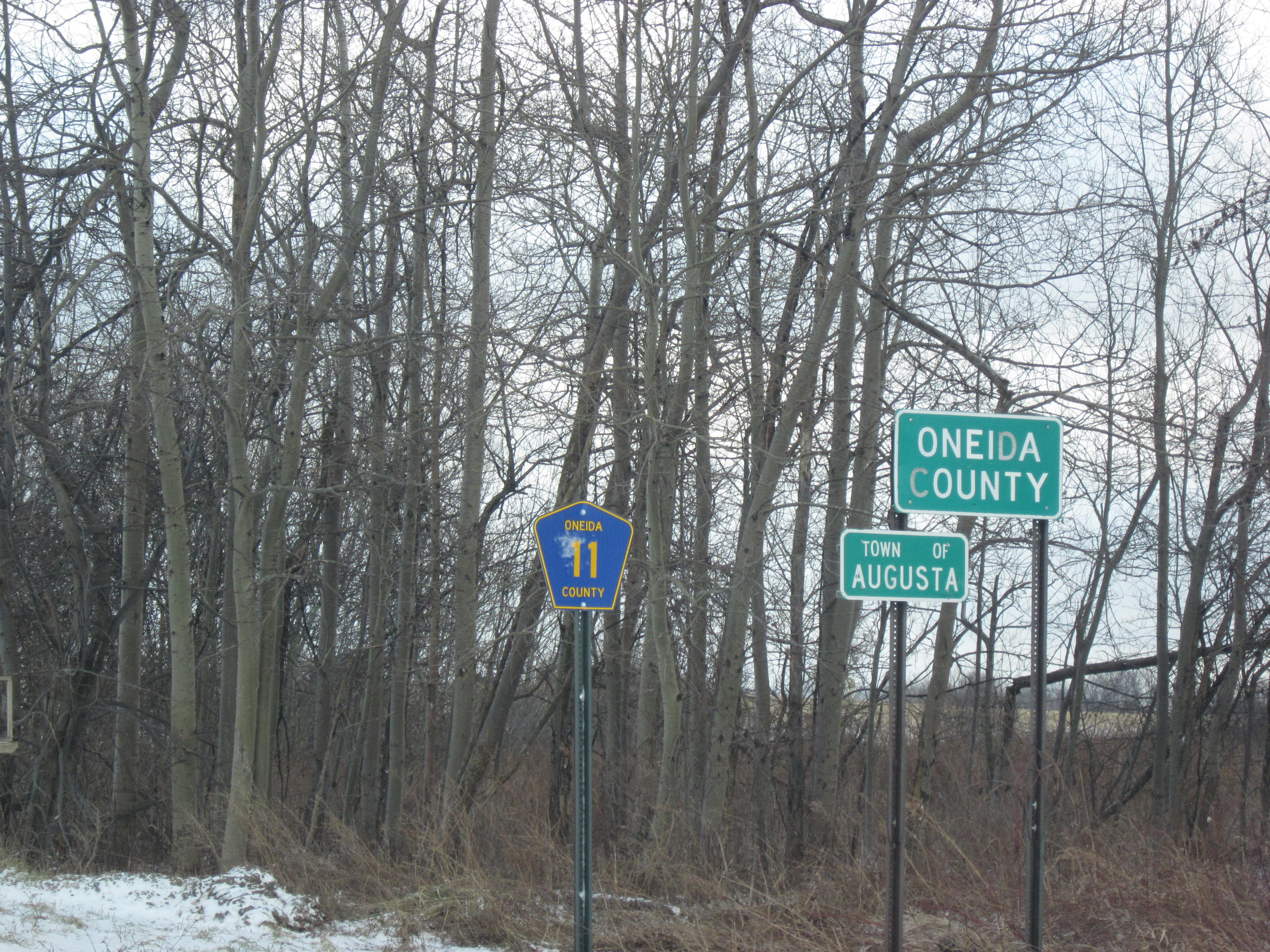
- Entering the town of Augusta along the Madison County line and County Route 11

- Location in Oneida County and the state of New York.
- Coordinates: 42°58′N 75°30′W
- Country: United States
- State: New York
- County: Oneida
- Named for: Augustus Van Horn

Government
  - Type: Town Council
  - Town Supervisor: Suzanne M. Collins (R)
  - Town Council: Members' List: • Mark Stolarczyk (R); • Scott E. Kimball (R); • Wayne Russell (R); • Richard Ritenour (R)

Area
  - Total: 27.68 sq mi (71.70 km^{2})
  - Land: 27.68 sq mi (71.70 km^{2})
  - Water: 0 sq mi (0.00 km^{2})
- Elevation: 920 ft (280 m)

Population (2010)
  - Total: 2,020
  - Estimate (2016): 2,041
  - Density: 73.7/sq mi (28.47/km^{2})
- Time zone: UTC-5 (Eastern (EST))
  - Summer (DST): UTC-4 (EDT)
- ZIP Codes: 13425 (Oriskany Falls); 13328 (Deansboro); 13402 (Madison); 13409 (Munnsville); 13477 (Vernon Center)
- Area code: 315
- FIPS code: 36-03155
- GNIS feature ID: 0978696
- Website: townofaugusta.org

Augusta is a town in Oneida County, New York, United States. The population was 2,021 at the 2020 census.

The town of Augusta is in the southwestern part of Oneida County and includes the village of Oriskany Falls.

== History ==
Augusta was settled in 1793 by a man named Gunn, whose son, Peter Smith Gunn, was the first child born in the town.

=== Other early settlers ===
Gunn was followed by Benjamin Warren, David Morton, and John Alden. On August 17, 1793, Ichabod Stafford, and Joseph and Abraham Forbes arrived bringing the population to 23. Other settlers arriving in 1794 and 1795 were Isaac and Benjamin Allen, Amos Parker, a Revolutionary War veteran, James Cassety, Frances O'Toole, Ozias Hart, Abel Prior, Thomas Spafford, Ezra Saxton, Abiel Lindsley, and J. Reynolds.

1796 brought Abraham and Alexander Holmes, Oliver Bartholomew, Deacon Philip Pond, William Martin, Stephen Crosby, Archibald and John Manchester, Robert Worden, and John Goodhue.

Several families arrived in 1797, all from Washington, Connecticut. These were Robert Durkee, Newton Smith, Joseph Hurd, Sheldon Parmalee, Benhamin and Joseph Durkee, and David Curtis.

Andrew McMillan arrived from North Conway, New Hampshire, in 1798. McMillan's son, also named Andrew McMillan, became superintendent of the Utica Schools. The first merchant, named Adams, opened in 1798.

Josiah Cook came from Otis, Massachusetts, in 1799. The area in which he settled was called "Cook's Corners". Several other settlers arrived from an adjacent town, Blandford including Abner Ranney, Elisha Shepard, and many belonging to the Knox family. Cook's Corners was later renamed Knox's Corners then Knoxboro.

Another early settler was Charles Putnam, from Stonington, Connecticut, having first lived in Clinton for two years. He is also a Revolutionary War veteran and is credited with building the first timber frame barn in the town, built of black ash.

=== Land ===
The town is made up of land of:

- The Peter Smith tract (later called the New Petersburgh Patent), an Indian lease of 60,000 acres in 1794. Smith sub-divided his tract and leased the land to settlers.
- Part of the approximately 4,000 acre Stockbridge Indian reservation (later called the Stockbridge Patent)
- a small portion of the "Chenango Twenty Towns" (or the "Governor's Purchase"), purchased via treaty from the Six Nations in 1788
- a portion of the "Oneida Reservation", a tract sold by the Oneida Indians to New York State in 1795 and auctioned by the state in 1797.

=== Civic formation ===
The first attempt to organize the town was in 1797. A bill was considered in the New York State Legislature and passed the Assembly, but failed in the Senate because Senator Samuel Jones noted that town officers must be freeholders and many of the prospective town officials were lessees of Peter Smith's land. Organization was successful the next year and Augusta was created as a town simultaneously with the creation of Oneida County on March 15, 1798. It was created from part of the town of Whitestown.

The first town meeting was held on April 3, 1798. The following positions were filled: town supervisor, town clerk, assessors (4), commissioner of highways (3), overseers of the poor (2), constable and collector, inspectors of schools (3), fence viewers (3).

Part of the town was taken to form part of the new town of Vernon on February 17, 1802.

=== Name ===
The act that created the town specified it would be called Augusta to honor General Augustus Van Horn. This was arranged by Thomas Cassety, son of James Cassety and a Colonel in the militia, in exchange for a new military hat from Van Horn.

=== Commerce ===
James Cassety built a saw mill in 1794 and the first grist-mill in 1796, which was destroyed by flooding around 1807. A second mill was built by David Currie and had an adjacent saw-mill, both powered by the water of Oriskany Creek. A tannery and currier was built by Aaron Burley in 1816. The building was subsequently used as a grist-mill, distillery, and later a wool factory. A hotel was built around 1836 by John Stebbins. A foundry and machine-shop was built in 1853 that manufactured various machines and implements. A later grist-mill was built by Martin Miller in 1861–62. A yarn factory was built in 1865.

A plank road was constructed through Oriskany Falls connecting Deansville (now Deansboro) and Hamilton in June 1848 by the Hamilton and Deansville Plank Road Company. It was abandoned in 1874.

A plank road was constructed through Augusta connecting Rome and Madison by the Rome and Madison Plank Road Company in April 1850.

The Chenango Canal, connecting the Erie Canal in Utica with the Susquehanna River at Binghamton was constructed from July 1834 to October 1836 and passed through a corner of Augusta. It was an important means of transporting coal from Pennsylvania but ceased operation in 1878 and was abandoned after rail transport became dominate.

The railroad reached Augusta in the late 1860s with the construction of the Utica, Clinton and Binghamton Railroad with a station in the Oriskany Falls, a village in southeast Augusta, on the line from Utica to the New York, Ontario and Western Railway.

The economy of the town was largely based upon agriculture, the small industry centered around the village of Oriskany Falls, and the quarrying of lime and limestone which was in abundant supply and exported around the country.

=== Assemblymen from Augusta ===
The following people from Augusta represented Oneida County in the New York State Assembly.

- David I. Ambler - 40th New York State Legislature, 1816–17
- Winthrop H. Chandler - 50th New York State Legislature, 1827
- Riley Shepard - 54th New York State Legislature, 1831 and 58th New York State Legislature, 1835
- David Murray - 66th New York State Legislature, 1843

== Geography ==
According to the United States Census Bureau, the town has a total area of 27.7 square miles (72 km^{2}), all land.

The southern and western town lines form the border with Madison County.

=== Historic places ===
The following is listed on the National Register of Historic Places:

- First Congregational Free Church

== Demographics ==
Historical population
| Census | Pop. | Note | %± |
|---|---|---|---|
| 1800 | 1,598 | | — |
| 1810 | 2,004 | | 25.4% |
| 1820 | 2,771 | | 38.3% |
| 1830 | 2,058 | | −25.7% |
| 1840 | 2,175 | | 5.7% |
| 1850 | 2,271 | | 4.4% |
| 1860 | 2,213 | | −2.6% |
| 1870 | 2,067 | | −6.6% |
| 1880 | 2,171 | | 5.0% |
| 1890 | 1,984 | | −8.6% |
| 1900 | 2,029 | | 2.3% |
| 1910 | 1,959 | | −3.4% |
| 1920 | 1,911 | | −2.5% |
| 1930 | 1,739 | | −9.0% |
| 1940 | 1,900 | | 9.3% |
| 1950 | 1,933 | | 1.7% |
| 1960 | 2,021 | | 4.6% |
| 1970 | 2,025 | | 0.2% |
| 1980 | 2,080 | | 2.7% |
| 1990 | 2,070 | | −0.5% |
| 2000 | 1,966 | | −5.0% |
| 2010 | 2,020 | | 2.7% |
| 2016 (est.) | 2,041 | | 1.0% |
U.S. Decennial Census

As of the census of 2000, there were 1,966 people, 744 households, and 532 families residing in the town. The population density was 70.9 inhabitants per square mile (27.4/km^{2}). There were 812 housing units at an average density of 29.3 per square mile (11.3/km^{2}). The racial makeup of the town was 97.91% White, 0.31% African American, 0.76% Asian, 0.36% from other races, and 0.66% from two or more races. Hispanic or Latino of any race were 0.56% of the population.

There were 744 households, out of which 33.2% had children under the age of 18 living with them, 57.0% were married couples living together, 8.6% had a female householder with no husband present, and 28.4% were non-families. 24.2% of all households were made up of individuals, and 13.2% had someone living alone who was 65 years of age or older. The average household size was 2.63 and the average family size was 3.11.

In the town, the population was spread out, with 26.5% under the age of 18, 8.1% from 18 to 24, 28.9% from 25 to 44, 22.7% from 45 to 64, and 13.7% who were 65 years of age or older. The median age was 37 years. For every 100 females, there were 100.4 males. For every 100 females age 18 and over, there were 97.9 males.

The median income for a household in the town was $33,274, and the median income for a family was $41,302. Males had a median income of $28,977 versus $23,063 for females. The per capita income for the town was $16,367. About 5.5% of families and 8.6% of the population were below the poverty line, including 12.2% of those under age 18 and 10.4% of those age 65 or over.

== Communities and locations in Augusta ==
- Augusta – The hamlet of Augusta on NY 26.
- Five Corners – A location northeast of Augusta.
- Knoxboro – A hamlet northwest of Augusta.
- Lloyds Corners – A location south of Augusta.
- Lyons Mills – A hamlet west of Oriskany Falls.
- Newell Corners – A location west of Lloyds Corners.
- Oriskany Falls – The Village of Oriskany Falls is by the southeastern corner of the town.
- Prospect Hill – An elevation located west of Lloyds Corners.
- Wells Corners – A hamlet in the northeastern part of the town.

== Notable people ==
- John Jay Knox, (1828–1892), born in Augusta, financier and the United States Comptroller of the Currency.
- Ella Farman Pratt, (1837-1907), born in Augusta, editor and writer.
- Perry H. Smith, (1828-1885), born in Augusta, businessman and politician
