= Fence viewer =

Municipal official covering fence laws

A fence viewer is a town or city official who administers fence laws by inspecting new fences and settles disputes arising from trespass by livestock that had escaped enclosure.

The office of fence viewer is one of the oldest appointments in New England. The office emigrated along with New England pioneers to the Midwest and to Canada as well, where the office still exists.

== History ==
New England farmers clearing their land during the 17th century were confronted with boulders and stones left by retreating glaciers. They cleared their fields of boulders with horses and built stone walls along the edges of their fields, frequently at the property boundary. Many of these walls still exist.

A fence viewer was needed when walls were eroded, moved, or modified illegally. This was a serious offense. The term "fence viewer" has been traced back to 1661.

== Duties ==
Upon request of any citizen, the fence viewer inspected fences to see that they were in good repair and in case of disputes between neighbors, worked to resolve their differences. Problems such as size, condition, and distance from property lines are complaints that still arise between neighbors.

=== Canada ===
==== Ontario ====
In the province of Ontario, the Line Fences Act outlines arbitration procedures for property owners who are unable to agree on matters related to fencing boundaries. The Act applies in two specific situations:

1. When there is no existing fence at the boundary between two properties, and one owner desires the construction of a new fence to delineate the boundary.

2. When a line fence already exists, and one owner believes it requires reconstruction or repair.

To resolve disputes in such cases, property owners may request a viewing by fence-viewers who are appointed by the municipality. A panel of three fence-viewers are required to be present at a viewing. They are authorized to determine:

1. The allocation of responsibility for the fencing work between the two adjoining owners.

2. The specifications of the fence to be constructed or reconstructed on the boundary line, including the materials to be used.

Following the viewing, the fence-viewers issue an award that outlines their decision, including the allocation of costs incurred during the proceeding between the two owners involved.

=== United States ===
==== Connecticut ====
In Connecticut, fence viewer is a duty assigned as needed to a selectman or other official. The fence viewer can use their judgment to determine if a fence is sufficient and equivalent to the type of fence required by statute. Selectmen serving as fence viewers receive compensation of two dollars per day. Local governments may also appoint a person, or a committee of three people, to perform the function of fence viewer.

If a property owner builds a fence around his property, and then subsequently an adjoining property owner encloses the adjacent property, the second party must purchase one half of the fence built by the first party on the common property line. If the two parties cannot reach an agreement, a fence viewer will determine the amount to be paid. Fence viewers also inspect divisional fences in need of repair and notify the negligent party to repair the fence, and estimate the cost to be paid to the adjoining property owner to make the repairs if the negligent owner fails to comply.

==== Delaware ====
The state of Delaware provides that fence viewers assess damages resulting from the trespass of a horse, cattle, goat, sheep or hog on a fenced property. If an animal is "unruly" and breaks a fence, damages are doubled. Fence viewers are appointed by the Superior Court annually, and there must be between five and eight per one hundred capita. Fence viewers act in groups of three so there will be a majority. They are paid eight dollars per day and compensated seven cents per mile for travel to the location of any dispute. Fence viewers judge if a fence is in disrepair and order that it be fixed; however, if the order goes unheeded, the matter is turned over to a Justice of the Peace.

==== Maine ====
In Maine, fence viewers use their judgement to determine if a fence is legal and sufficient. Fence viewers inspect and certify repairs to boundary fences done when one owner is negligent. They may also be involved in authorizing a boundary fence to be built on other than the true boundary if building on the boundary is impractical. Fence viewers determine the amount to be paid in situations when one party is purchasing the half of a boundary fence they don't already own.

All actions involving fence viewers in Maine require decisions to be made by a minimum of two fence viewers. If fence viewers are involved with a fence that is on a boundary line between two different towns, one fence viewer must be from each town.

Maine fence viewers are paid $3 a per day. Any fence viewer who, when requested, unreasonably neglects to view any fence or to perform any other duties required of the fence viewer forfeits $3 to any person suing therefor within 40 days after such neglect and is liable for all damages to the party injured.

==== Massachusetts ====
In Massachusetts, this position was first established in 1693 by a statute which was amended in 1785 and again in 1836.

Early fence viewers, armed with wall measurements, were able to arbitrate and/or prosecute such crimes by adjoining farmers. Trespassing by livestock was illegal. Boundaries and fences had to be maintained. If a farmer neglected his fence, his neighbor could do the repairs and charge his nonperforming neighbor twice the cost. If the negligent neighbor didn't come up with the money, he had to pay 12% interest until payment was made.

Today, the fence viewer advises lot owners prior to constructing a fence. The height of the fence can be no higher than six feet except near intersections. Lot owners at intersections cannot erect a fence nor shrubbery closer than five feet to allow good visibility. A fence or shrub near there must be no higher than three feet.

Spite fences erected to annoy neighbors are illegal. The fence viewer has the power to order such fences changed to be inoffensive. If hostilities escalate, the building inspector is asked to become involved. His word is final. The Commonwealth of Massachusetts General Laws chapter 49 describe in detail the obligations of lot owners.

==== Nebraska ====
For more than 100 years farmers across the state of Nebraska relied on fence viewers to play the role of mediators in disputes between landowners regarding the cost of fencing. When neighbors cannot agree on what type of fence to build, how to maintain the fence or how to pay for it, either neighbor can request a fence view. The local county clerk is then responsible for appointing a three-member fence viewer committee. Fence viewers then determine what type of fence should be built and how construction and maintenance costs will be shared, as well as establish a portion of the fence for each neighbor to maintain. In 2007 the Nebraska Legislature repealed the law, sending the responsibilities of fence viewers to local courts.

==== New Hampshire ====
In New Hampshire, fence viewers resolve disputes about the purchase of a division of a boundary fence. They are called to view if a fence is in disrepair and can order it to be fixed. They determine the suitability of streams, ditches, etc. to be considered sufficient as fences, and designate where a fence be built when it is impractical to build it on the boundary line without unreasonable cost.

Fence viewers are required to give notices in writing of any action, to hear any evidence, and make their decision in writing. New Hampshire law states that "the decision of the fence-viewers, upon their being sworn that they have acted impartially, uprightly and to the best of their judgment, shall be final and conclusive upon the parties." If a fence is on a boundary line between two different towns, fence viewers from only one town are used. Fence viewers are paid two dollars per day.

==== New York ====
Fence viewers in New York resolve disputes about maintenance of division fences and the value of a division fence to be transferred. Disputes are resolved by any two of the fence viewers of a town, with one selected by each party to the dispute. If the two fence viewers do not agree, they select a third fence viewer which results in a majority decision which when filed in writing becomes final. Fence viewers may question and subpoena witnesses, and are paid one dollar and fifty cents per day. Fence viewers assess damages from neglected or unbuilt fences, including damages caused by animals not kept on the owner's property. They can specify the distance between posts of a barbed wire division fence. Fence viewers are compensated ten cents per mile for travel related to escape of animals. They are also charged with selling at auction strays that are not redeemed by the owner.

==== Pennsylvania ====
Pennsylvania repealed all state laws relating to fence viewers in 1992 but kept the terminology by stating that in disputes over division fences, the county surveyor, or a surveyor appointed by a judge of the court of common pleas, shall act as a fence viewer. The surveyor inspects the fence to determine sufficiency, or if the fence can be repaired and at what cost, or the estimated cost of a replacement. A surveyor acting as a fence viewer can charge up to twenty-five dollars.

==== Ohio ====
In Ohio, partition fences for livestock are regulated in accordance with Chapter 971 of the Ohio Revised Code.

==== Rhode Island ====
In Rhode Island, division fences cannot be made of barbed-wire unless both adjoining owners consent in writing. If a barbed-wire fence is erected without proper consent, the town fence viewer notifies that the fence be removed, and if it is not taken down, the fence viewer removes the fence and stores the material. Barbed-wire fences built prior to April 20, 1906, are exempt. Fence viewers also determine the cost to be paid for a division fence if the owners do not otherwise agree. As in other states, they resolve disputes concerning the maintenance of fences and can order the delinquent party to build, repair, or rebuild a fence. The fence viewer also files a lien for twice the cost to complete such an order if it is ignored. The fence viewer is entitled to six dollars per day and must pay five dollars per day for failing to perform their function. A complainant may file a complaint about a fence with any fence viewer they choose from the town in which the subject fence is located.

Rhode Island also has a criminal law against the impersonation of a fence viewer, with a fine of $20 to $100.

==== Vermont ====
Fence viewers played a more active part in Vermont in the 18th and 19th centuries. Today they are rarely used. On occasion, the selectmen will call upon them to examine a fence line between adjoining properties to determine what portion of the fence must be made, repaired, or maintained by each party. Fence viewers may also be asked to determine where a fence must be placed when a fence cannot be placed squarely on a property line.

Three fence viewers are appointed by the selectmen each year. They must be qualified voters of the town and must be sworn into office.

Fence viewers examine fences and other boundaries within the town when requested to do so by the selectmen.
