= Oriskany Falls, New York =

- Village
- Location in Oneida County and the state of New York.
- Coordinates: 42°56′17″N 75°27′46″W
- Country: United States
- State: New York
- County: Oneida

Area
  - Total: 0.51 sq mi (1.31 km^{2})
  - Land: 0.51 sq mi (1.31 km^{2})
  - Water: 0 sq mi (0.00 km^{2})
- Elevation: 974 ft (297 m)

Population (2020)
  - Total: 658
  - Density: 1,299.8/sq mi (501.85/km^{2})
- Time zone: UTC-5 (Eastern (EST))
  - Summer (DST): UTC-4 (EDT)
- ZIP code: 13425
- Area code: 315
- FIPS code: 36-55376
- GNIS feature ID: 0959483

Oriskany Falls is a village in Oneida County, New York, United States. As of the 2020 census, Oriskany Falls had a population of 658. The name is derived from a waterfall on a nearby stream. The village is largely in the southeast section of the town of Augusta, but partly overlaps the town of Marshall. The community is at the intersection of routes 12B and 26, which share a brief concurrency within the village and south to Bouckville.

== History ==
The community was first settled circa 1794. It was originally known as Cassety Hollow, and was incorporated as the village of Oriskany Falls in the 1880s.

Perspective map of Oriskany Falls from 1891 with list of landmarks

In the mid and late 1900s, Mr. George Tucker owned a large portion of the town, which he donated to the people, including a church and the local store, "Tucker's Big M." The store, however, was sold in 2004 to the "Shur-Fine" corporation, who had a gas station put in and remodeled the storefront, and then again in 2006 to brothers-in-law Badal Singh and Sukhminder Singh, natives of India.

The First Congregational Free Church was listed on the National Register of Historic Places in 1979.

== Geography ==
Oriskany Falls is located at 42°56′17″N 75°27′46″W (42.938088, -75.462893).

According to the United States Census Bureau, the village has a total area of 0.5 square miles (1.3 km^{2}), all land.

The village is located on Oriskany Creek and is near the border of Madison County.

== Demographics ==
Historical population
Census	Pop.	Note	%±
1870	628		—
1880	598		−4.8%
1890	625		4.5%
1900	811		29.8%
1910	892		10.0%
1920	1,014		13.7%
1930	853		−15.9%
1940	930		9.0%
1950	893		−4.0%
1960	972		8.8%
1970	927		−4.6%
1980	802		−13.5%
1990	795		−0.9%
2000	698		−12.2%
2010	732		4.9%
2020	658		−10.1%
U.S. decennial census

As of the census of 2000, there were 698 people, 292 households, and 178 families residing in the village. The population density was 1,423.1 inhabitants per square mile (549.5/km^{2}). There were 334 housing units at an average density of 681.0 per square mile (262.9/km^{2}). The racial makeup of the village was 98.14% white, .57% African American, .29% Asian, .14% from other races, and .86% from two or more races. Hispanic or Latino of any race were .43% of the population.

There were 292 households, out of which 29.1% had children under the age of 18 living with them, 43.5% were married couples living together, 11.6% had a female householder with no husband present, and 39.0% were non-families. 35.6% of all households were made up of individuals, and 22.6% had someone living alone who was 65 years of age or older. The average household size was 2.37 and the average family size was 3.02.

In the village, the population was spread out, with 24.6% under the age of 18, 9.2% from 18 to 24, 26.2% from 25 to 44, 21.6% from 45 to 64, and 18.3% who were 65 years of age or older. The median age was 39 years. For every 100 females, there were 94.4 males. For every 100 females age 18 and over, there were 87.9 males.

The median income for a household in the village was $24,716, and the median income for a family was $38,750. Males had a median income of $31,029 versus $23,906 for females. The per capita income for the village was $17,215. About 11.6% of families and 16.5% of the population were below the poverty line, including 26.2% of those under age 18 and 12.4% of those age 65 or over.

== Education ==
It is in the Waterville Central School District.
