= List of presidents of Hillsdale College =

This is a list of presidents of Hillsdale College, an arts college in Hillsdale, Michigan.

- Daniel McBride Graham (1844–1848) – An Oberlin College graduate, Graham was the first president of Michigan Central College in Spring Arbor, Michigan established December 4, 1844 (later to become Hillsdale College). The school opened with only five students in a small, deserted, two-room store. He resigned the presidency in 1848 to become a pastor in Saco, Maine.
- Edmund Burke Fairfield (1848–1869) – Michigan Central College moved to the city of Hillsdale, Michigan, and became Hillsdale College, reopening on November 7, 1855. During his presidency, he helped found the Republican Party with Professor Ransom Dunn in neighboring Jackson, Michigan.[24] A prominent leader in the new-found party, Fairfield was present at its first convention in 1858, where he was elected Lieutenant-Governor of Michigan.
- James Calder (1869–1871) – In his short administration the commercial school was opened, and the theological department was established. During the first year of his presidency, Hillsdale had 724 students. Calder resigned in 1871 to become president of what is now Pennsylvania State University.
- Daniel McBride Graham (1871–1874) – 3 years (second term) Facing almost total destruction of the campus by fire, Graham led the rebuilding of the campus during the 1873 financial panic.
- Ransom Dunn interim 1874
- DeWitt Clinton Durgin (1874–1884) – 10 years, Durgin, a native of New Hampshire, and graduate of Union College became president.
- George F. Mosher (1886–1901) – A native of Maine, Mosher had been a nurse caring for wounded soldiers in the Civil War. Mosher’s years as president were a period of particularly high academic achievement. Hillsdale was widely known as one of the strongest small colleges in the Midwest. Mosher was a Phi Beta Kappa graduate of Bowdoin College. After serving in a German consulate, he accepted the Hillsdale presidency in September, 1886. He was the first Hillsdale president who was not an ordained minister. His most pressing problem was to keep enlarging the endowment.
- Joseph Ward Mauck (1902–1922) – Mauck graduated from Hillsdale in 1875, served six years as president of the University of South Dakota, and became treasurer of the Chicago & Milwaukee Electric Railway. He returned to his alma mater as one of its most beloved presidents in 1902 and served for two decades. Even his business skills, however, could not prevent Hillsdale from facing more and more serious financial problems.
- William Gear Spencer (1922–1932) – In contrast to the Mauck years, Hillsdale during the Spencer era was relatively prosperous. Prior to coming to Hillsdale at only 35 years of age, Spencer had already received two degrees from Denison and had taught at Colgate and Franklin. Slayton Arboretum was given to the College in 1922. The Oxford debating team met the home team at Hillsdale College in 1924. Contracts for building Mauck Hall dormitory and a field house were signed in 1926.
- Willfred Otto Mauck (1933–1942) – Mauck was the son of Joseph William Mauck, former Hillsdale president. A graduate of Hillsdale, graduate student at Columbia University, and professor of history at the University of Ohio, he became one of the youngest college presidents in the United States. The mood of the college under Willfred Otto Mauck was often gloomy because of harsh financial conditions partially related to the Great Depression. Mauck was forced to cancel all construction projects, and a Detroit newspaper printed the misleading headline, “Hillsdale for Sale for $11,000.” The average faculty member received a salary of less than $2,000 a year.
- Harvey L. Turner (1942–1952) – Dr. Turner’s formal inaugural was the first in Hillsdale’s history. Financial pressures caused by World War II were severe, and in 1950 Turner gave a gloomy report that the current year would end with a $5,000 deficit, and that the 1950–1951 fiscal budget would end with an imbalance four times as large. On a more positive note, the Wilbur J. Carr Memorial Library was completed in May 1950. Turner characterized his presidency as a “decade of difficulties and developments.”
- J. Donald Phillips (1952–1971) – Phillips strongly emphasized human relations as the primary characteristic of Hillsdale College. Largely removing the possibility of financial collapse which characterized the Turner years, Phillips oversaw the construction of a number of new campus buildings. However, his administration ended with the College still facing numerous financial weaknesses.
- George Roche III (1971–1999) – Roche made the raising of an endowment sufficient to ensure the College’s long-term survival one of his first priorities. A series of new programs such as the Center for Constructive Alternatives brought hundreds of prominent national speakers to campus. Imprimis, a free national speech digest started in 1972, now reaches over 2.6 million readers. Academic progress proceeded rapidly, as did the construction of many new buildings. Hillsdale College’s reputation became national in scope. He resigned in disgrace after the revelation of sexual impropriety.
- Larry P. Arnn (2000–present) –
