= Hillsdale Academy =

School in Michigan, United States

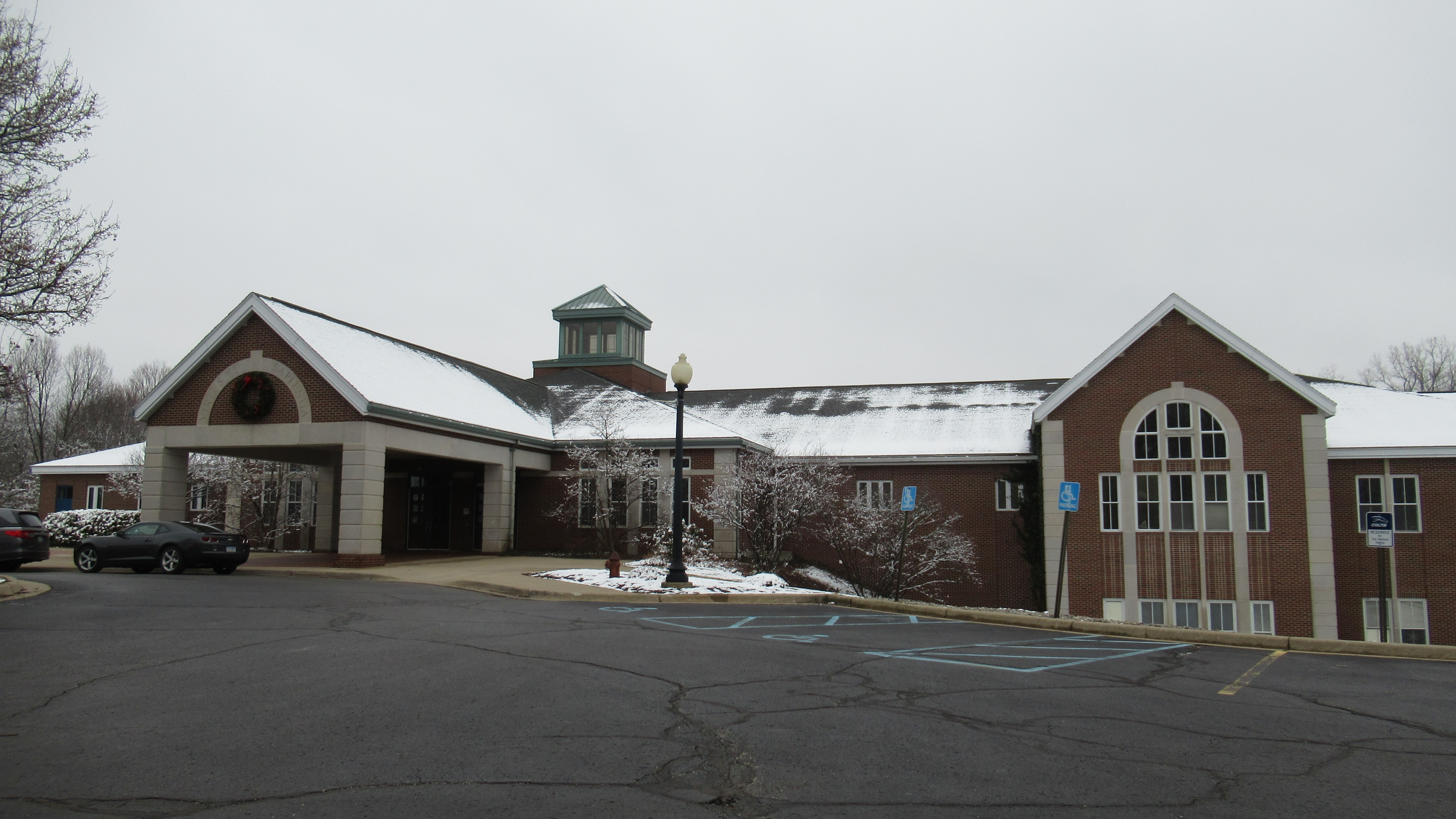

Location
- One Academy Lane; Hillsdale, Michigan 49242; United States; 41°55′42″N 84°37′24″W

Information
- Type: Private K-12 Liberal Arts
- Motto: "Virtus et Sapientia" (Virtue and Wisdom)
- Established: 1990
- Headmaster: Mike Roberts
- Teaching staff: 17.8 (on an FTE basis)
- Grades: K-12
- Enrollment: 198 (2017-18)
- Student to teacher ratio: 11.1
- Colors: Navy and white
- Athletics conference: Southern Central Athletic Association
- Nickname: horses ref name="MHSAA"/>
- Website: academy.hillsdale.edu

The Hillsdale Academy is a K-12 liberal arts school operated by Hillsdale College. Hillsdale Academy is located in Hillsdale, Michigan.

== History ==
The Hillsdale Academy was founded in 1990 as a model K-8 school. Originally housed in mobile units with 2 grades (clusters) assigned to each building, the school tried to emulate the one-room schoolhouse education that former Hillsdale College President George Roche III experienced as a child in Colorado. The school was originally located on Barber Drive, across from the Slayton Arboretum and adjacent to the Simpson practice fields.

A new double level building was finished in 1998. With the new building an Upper School was added, incorporating grades 9-12. The Upper School students have classrooms on the top floor, while Lower School students have their classrooms on the bottom floor. The school is located south-east of Hillsdale College, near the George Roche Sports Complex. The first headmaster of the K-12 Academy was Scot Hicks.

== Athletics ==
Hillsdale Academy has athletics for both boys and girls with their mascot name of the "Colts." For boys, Hillsdale offers basketball, cross country, golf, soccer, and track. For girls, they offer basketball, cross country, track, and volleyball.
