= George H. Ball =

American academic, pastor and writer

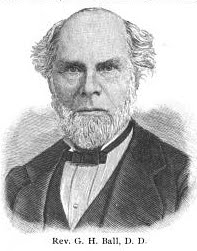
George H. Ball, Free Will Baptist teacher and pastor

George Harvey Ball (1819–1907) was an American academic, pastor, writer, and founder of Keuka College in New York.

== Early life and education ==
George H. Ball was born in 1819 near the city of Sherbrooke, Quebec to American parents from Massachusetts, William and Marcy (Harvey) Ball. In 1836 his family moved to Ohio. Rev. Ransom Dunn, a Free Will Baptist minister befriended Ball and introduced him to that denomination. Ball studied at Farmington Academy and Grand River Institute and received a license to preach in 1843 and moved to Canada to preach and teach. In 1847 Ball graduated from the Baptist Bible School (later named Cobb Divinity School at Bates College), which was then located in Whitestown, New York. Bates College later awarded Ball an honorary doctorate of divinity. After giving them a loan, George Ball's nephews, the Ball brothers, developed the Ball canning jar and eventually founded Ball State University with the proceeds from this successful investment.

George H. Ball descends from an early colonial immigrant, Edward Ball, and several other founders of Newark, New Jersey.

== Career ==
Ball married Maria L. Bensly and served as a pastor in Chester, Ohio, and principal of Geauga Seminary in Ohio where he taught future President James A. Garfield and future First Lady Lucretia Garfield. In 1851, Ball started a church in Buffalo, New York, and then became pastor of Roger Williams Church in Providence, Rhode Island. Ball also served as a Trustee of Storer College and Hillsdale College. Ball was the founder of Keuka College in New York. He also served as an editor of the "Morning Star" and "Baptist Union." Ball returned to Buffalo and during the election of 1884 was known for his investigation of a scandal involving Grover Cleveland fathering a child out of wedlock. Ball died in 1907 in Clifton Springs, New York. He was predeceased by his wife and survived by two daughters.
