= National Council on Educational Research =

The National Council on Educational Research (NCER) was part of the U.S. Department of Education. The council was originally tasked with overseeing the activities of the educational Labs and Centers established by Congress, the largest of which was the Northwest Regional Educational Laboratory located in Portland, Oregon. Although the labs and centers had budgets sometimes in the millions of dollars (largely from Congress) the council, itself, was a very small body, consisting of just two or three permanent staff members. The Council members were presidential appointees confirmed by Congress. Historically, the Council met infrequently, and rarely did more than endorse what the labs and centers chose to do.

During the Reagan Administration, George Roche, then President of Hillsdale College, was appointed Chair of the council. Other members at the time included Carl W. Salser, then executive director of Educational Research Associates, of Portland, Oregon. Council members at that time chose to take their responsibilities more seriously, met as frequently as two or three times per year, taking testimony from researchers and educational professionals, and even examined the operation of the labs and centers to learn if their services were of significant value to schools and educators.

The initial draft report was somewhat critical of the labs and centers, whose lobbyists encouraged Congress to restrict the council's authority. Subsequently, the council's purpose was changed; its supervisory responsibility over the labs and centers was stripped, and it became merely the National Advisory Council on Educational Research and Improvement.
