= Alfred W. Anthony =

American author (1860–1939)

Alfred Williams Anthony
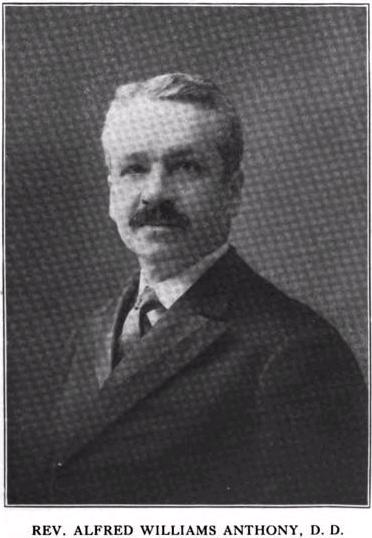
- Born: 13 January 1860; Providence, Rhode Island, United States
- Died: 20 January 1939 (aged 79); New York City, New York, United States
- Education: Brown University (A.B. 1883, A.M. 1886), Cobb Divinity School (1885)
- Occupations: Author, Freewill Baptist leader, Religion professor
- Years active: 1887–1918
- Known for: Religion professor at Bates College, Freewill Baptist leadership
- Notable work: Various books and articles on religion
- Parent(s): Lewis Williams Anthony, Britannia Franklin Waterman
- Relatives: Descendant of Roger Williams

Alfred Williams Anthony (13 January 1860 – 20 January 1939) was an American author, Freewill Baptist leader, and religion professor at Bates College in Maine.

== Biography ==
He was born in Providence, Rhode Island, on 13 January 1860 to Lewis Williams Anthony and Britannia Franklin Waterman. He was a descendant of Rhode Island founder, Roger Williams. Anthony graduated from Brown University in 1883 and Cobb Divinity School in 1885, which was then affiliated with Bates College. Anthony also received an A.M. degree from Brown in 1886.

In 1887, he was appointed to a professorship at Cobb Divinity School and went on to publish various books and articles. When the Divinity School merged with the college religion department, he became a religion professor at Bates College serving from 1908 to 1911. He retired from Bates in 1918 to New York City. He donated land in Lewiston near Bates College to the Stanton Bird Club to create Thorncrag Nature Sanctuary. Anthony was also active in various Freewill Baptist institutions and served as President of the Board of Trustees of Storer College in West Virginia. He was also Chairman of the Committee on Goodwill between Jews and Christians. He travelled to Africa and Asia as Secretary for the Free Will Baptist Home Missions Council. Anthony also as a Trustee for Bates College, Hillsdale College, and Brown University.

He died on 20 January 1939 and was buried in Swan Point Cemetery in Rhode Island.

Cobb Divinity School faculty, ca. 1895 with Anthony in the lower left

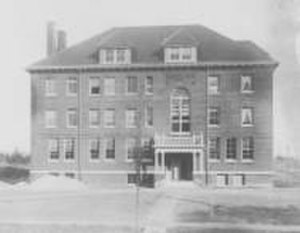
Cobb Divinity School building once funded by Deacon L.W. Anthony (Alfred Anthony's father)

Anthony Hall on the Storer College campus in Harpers Ferry

== Books and honors ==
Anthony published various notable books including An Introduction to the Life of Jesus (1896), The Method of Jesus (1899) and Bates College and Its Background (1936). He received an honorary D. D. from Bates in 1902, Brown in 1908, and an L.L.D. from Colby in 1914. Anthony died on January 20, 1939.

== Family ==
Anthony married Harriet Wyatt Angell in September 1885, and they had three children: Elizabeth Williams, Lewis Wilmarth (who died as a child) and Alfred Williams Anthony Jr. Elizabeth also graduated from Bates College in 1908. His first wife died in 1899. In February 1903 Anthony married Gertrude Brown Libbey, with whom he had three further children: Richard Lewis, Warren Shaw and Charles Sheldon Anthony.
