= Geauga Seminary =

Free Will Baptist school in Chester Township, Ohio, U.S.

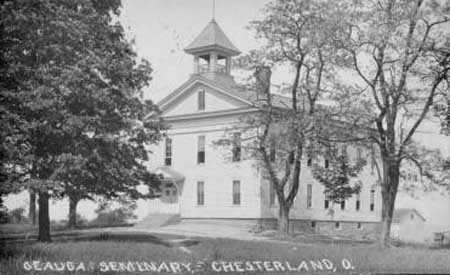
Geauga Seminary in Chesterland Ohio

The Geauga Seminary (also known as Western Reserve Labor Seminary) was a Free Will Baptist school in Chester Township, Geauga County, Ohio. President James Garfield attended the Seminary.

== History ==
The school was founded in 1842 by the Western Reserve Free-Will Baptist Society and the first building was constructed in 1843. Its charter prohibited any discrimination based upon race or gender. Early professors at the school included George H. Ball and Ransom Dunn, both Free Baptist clergymen from New England. President James Garfield met his wife Lucretia Garfield (Randolph) while attending Geauga. When the school closed in 1853, most of its assets were acquired by Hillsdale College in Michigan, another Free Will Baptist institution. The Seminary building was demolished in 1927.

== Notable people affiliated with Geauga ==
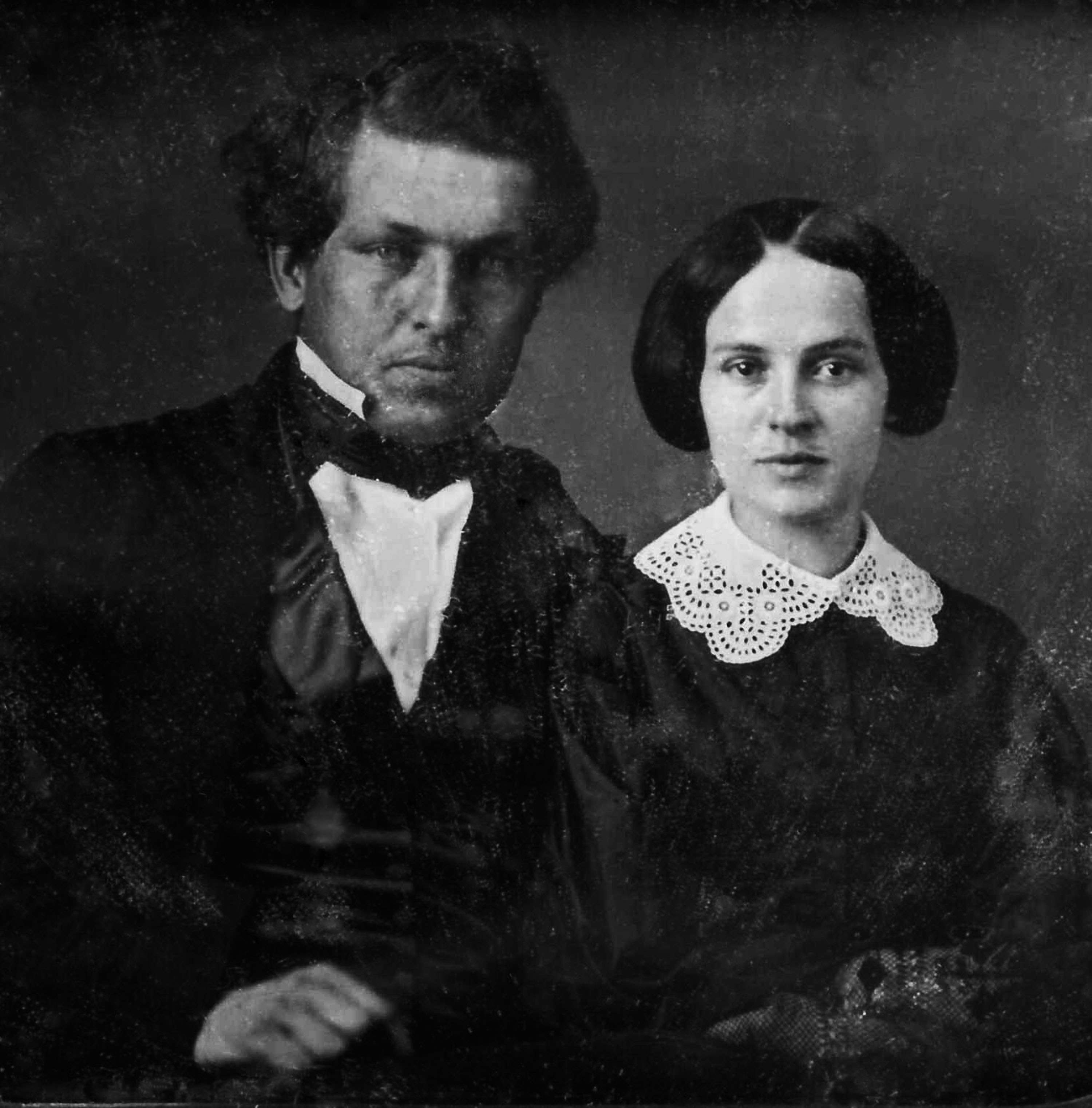
President James A. Garfield and Lucretia Garfield

- George H. Ball, Freewill Baptist pastor and teacher at Geauga Seminary
- George T. Day, principal of Geauga Seminary, writer, professor at Bates College
- Orlando J. Hodge, Speaker of the Ohio House of Representatives
- Ransom Dunn, Freewill Baptist pastor and teacher at Geauga Seminary
- Charles Gordon Ames, Unitarian clergyman, editor and lecturer.
- Robert Vaughn (Australian politician)
- Stephen A. Walker, principal of Geauga Seminary for a year, lawyer, U.S. Attorney for the Southern District of New York
- James Garfield, 20th President of the United States
- Lucretia Garfield, First Lady
