= Edmund Burke Fairfield =

American politician (1821–1904)

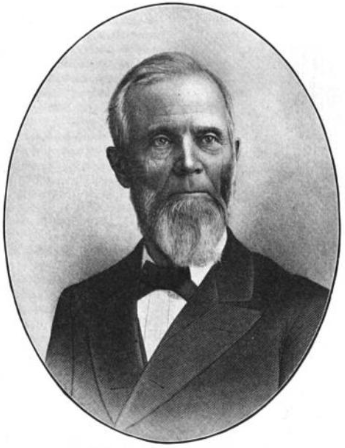

12th Lieutenant Governor of Michigan
- In office 1859–1861
- Governor: Moses Wisner
- Preceded by: George Coe
- Succeeded by: James M. Birney

Member of the Michigan Senate from the 14th district
- In office 1857–1859
- Preceded by: William H. Brockway
- Succeeded by: Ebenezer O. Grosvenor

2nd Chancellor of the University of Nebraska
- In office July 1, 1876 – June 30, 1882
- Preceded by: Allen R. Benton
- Succeeded by: James Irving Manatt

2nd President of Hillsdale College
- In office 1848–1869
- Preceded by: Daniel McBride Graham
- Succeeded by: James Calder

Personal details
- Born: August 7, 1821 Parkersburg, West Virginia
- Died: November 7, 1904 (aged 83) Oberlin, Ohio
- Party: Republican
- Spouse(s): Lucia Ann Jennison Fairfield; Mary A. Baldwin Fairfield; Mary Allen Tibbitts Fairfield
- Parent(s): Micajah Fairfield; Hannah (Wynn) Fairfield.
- Education: Denison University; Marietta College; Oberlin College; Colgate University; Indiana University.
- Profession: Minister; Educator; Politician

Edmund Burke Fairfield (August 7, 1821 – November 7, 1904) was an American minister, educator and politician from the U.S. state of Michigan. He served as the 12th lieutenant governor of Michigan and as the second Chancellor of the University of Nebraska.

== Early life ==
Fairfield was born in Parkersburg, Virginia, now West Virginia. He moved with his family to Troy, Ohio, when he was a young boy. He received an early education at Denison University of Granville and in 1837 he attended Marietta College of Marietta. He graduated from the congregationalist-affiliated Oberlin College of Oberlin in 1842. He then worked as a tutor at the college teaching Latin and Greek.

He spent two years as a Christian minister in New Hampshire, and two in Boston as pastor of the Ruggles Street Baptist Church. Then, in 1848, he became President of the Michigan Central College, renamed Hillsdale College in 1853, and remained in this office until his resignation in 1869. In 1857, Fairfield received LL.D. degree from Madison University (now Colgate University) in New York.

== Politics and further academics ==
Fairfield served as a Republican in the Michigan Senate (14th district) from 1857 to 1859. He was elected to serve as the 12th Lieutenant Governor of Michigan from 1859 to 1861, and made a widely published speech on the "Prohibition of Slavery in the Territories".

In 1863, Fairfield received a Doctor of Divinity degree from the Indiana University Bloomington. The following year he received an S.T.D. degree from Denison University of Ohio.

In the early 1870s, Fairfield was involved in public dispute based on a review he published in Mansfield, Ohio, regarding the Henry Ward Beecher adultery scandal. The scandal broke in 1873, and in 1874, Fairfield published "Wickedness in High Places: A Review of the Beecher Case" Robert Raikes Raymond, brother of Vassar professor John Howard Raymond, published a scathing review to this pamphlet entitled: "The Case of the Rev. E.B. Fairfield, D.D., LL.D.: Being an Examination of his 'Review of the case of Henry Ward Beecher" together with his 'Reply' and a Rejoinder"

He received a number of honors in the academic world before being elected Chancellor of the University of Nebraska in 1876. The Board of Regents dismissed him in 1882, after a disagreement over religion and its place in education.

Fairfield became the pastor of the Manistee congregational church from September 1882 to April 1889.

In 1886, he was the Moderator of the Congregationalists' "General Association of Michigan" meeting held in Flint

In July 1889, President Benjamin Harrison nominated Fairfield to be the consul of the United States at Lyon in place of Lawson V. Moore. His son George D. Fairfield was vice-consul in Lyon at the same time.

He returned from France in 1893 and lived in Grand Rapids, where he lived an intellectual life of writing and speaking until 1896. In 1896, he became a pastor again at his former church in Mansfield, Ohio, and then in 1900 he retired to Oberlin, where he died in November 1904.

== Retirement and death ==
In the theological field, Fairfield, having been a Baptist early in his career and Congregationalist pastor later in life, became convinced that the doctrines of Baptists were without sufficient foundation for him to remain a minister in any Baptist denomination. He delineated his views in his Letters on Baptism (1893). He died on November 7, 1904, in Oberlin, Ohio, at the age of eighty-three in Oberlin, eleven years after its publication.

== Family life ==
Fairfield was the son of Micajah Fairfield and Hannah (Wynn) Fairfield. He was married three times. He married his first wife, Lucia Ann Jennison, daughter of Dr. Charles Jennison and Betsy Mahan, on August 27, 1845. They had three children together. He married his second wife Mary A. Baldwin on August 22, 1859, and had seven children together. He married his third wife Mary Allen Tibbitts on June 16, 1883; they had no children together.

Fairfield was descended from a Frenchman by the name of Beauchamp, at some point the name was anglicised to Fairfield.

Political offices
Preceded by George Coe	Lieutenant Governor of Michigan; 1859–1861	Succeeded by James M. Birney
