= Nichols Latin School =

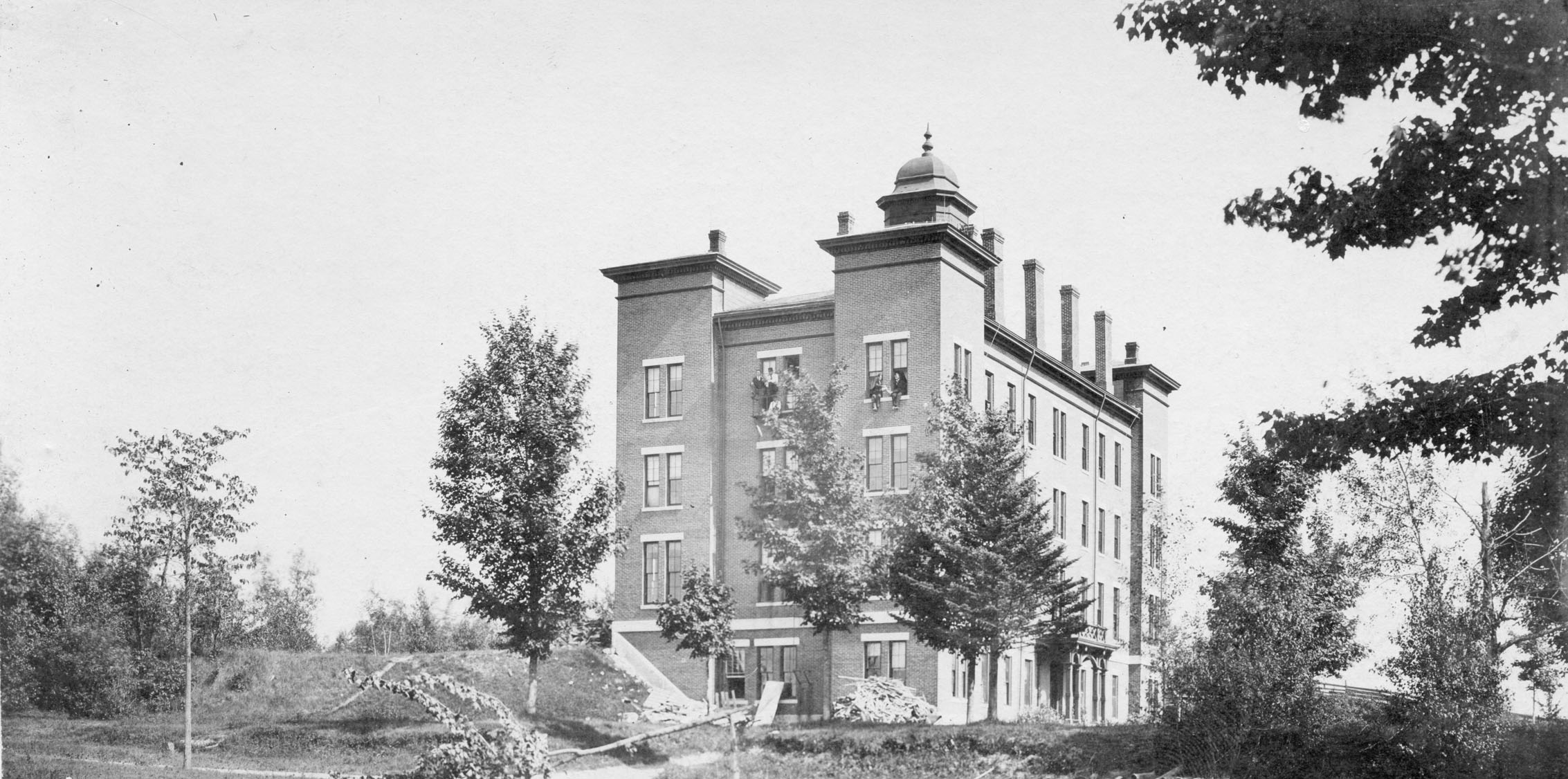
- The Nichols Latin School in 1873
- Lewiston, Maine

Information
- School type: Private school
- Status: Inactive
- Closed: March 16, 1899

The Nichols Latin School was a private college preparatory school that operated in the late 19th century to prepare students of both affluent and mixed income backgrounds. The Free Will Baptist school was linked with Bates College until its closing in 1899. A noted counter to schools like the Boston Latin School, it featured preparatory education for the youth of the northeastern areas of New England.

The school was located in downtown Lewiston, Maine, and was named after Lyman Nichols. The school was in-between the college itself and the Cobb Divinity School which provided the school with unique position in the secondary school market. The school's academic program included three years of study with a respective number of classes; the classes were organized in such a way that students from other secondary schools could easily transfer in and continue their education before applying to Bates. However, graduating students of the Nichols Latin School were not guaranteed admission to the college, as fewer students were accepted into the college than were graduated from the Latin school.

== Notable people ==
- Lewis Penick Clinton, African prince and missionary
- Hamilton Hatter, first president of Bluefield State College
- Henri J. Haskell, first attorney general of Montana
