= George T. Day =

Free Will Baptist writer and pastor

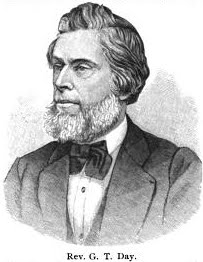
George T Day Free Will Baptist pastor and writer

George T. Day (1822–1875) was a Free Will Baptist writer, publisher, pastor and professor.

George Tiffany Day was born in Concord, New York, in 1822. Day worked in textile mills as a child, and his parents moved to Scituate, Rhode Island, and then Hebronville in Massachusetts. After his mother died when he was twelve, Day went to live with a brother in Lonsdale, Rhode Island, where he attended a revival and was later baptized by Martin Cheney in Olneyville in 1840. He then went to Maine, and returned to Rhode Island to study at the Smithville Seminary in Scituate. He next studied Latin and taught school in Bristol.

In 1847 Day graduated from the Free Will Baptist Theological School in Whitestown, New York (later known as Cobb Divinity School at Bates College) and became a pastor in Grafton, Massachusetts. In 1850 he served as president of the Geauga Seminary in Ohio, a school which future President James Garfield attended. Day returned to Rhode Island and served as a pastor of Martin Cheney's church in Olneyville and the Roger Williams Baptist Church. He also was a long-time editor of The Morning Star and Free Will Baptist Quarterly. During the Civil War, Day served the Christian Commission in the South.

In 1863, he became a Trustee at Bates College in Lewiston, Maine, and declined to serve as president of Hillsdale College in Michigan several times. Day continued working extensively with The Morning Star until his death in 1876 at his sister's house in Providence, Rhode Island. He was buried at the Pocasset Cemetery in Cranston, Rhode Island.
