= Thorncrag Nature Sanctuary =

Wildlife preserve in Lewiston, Maine, US

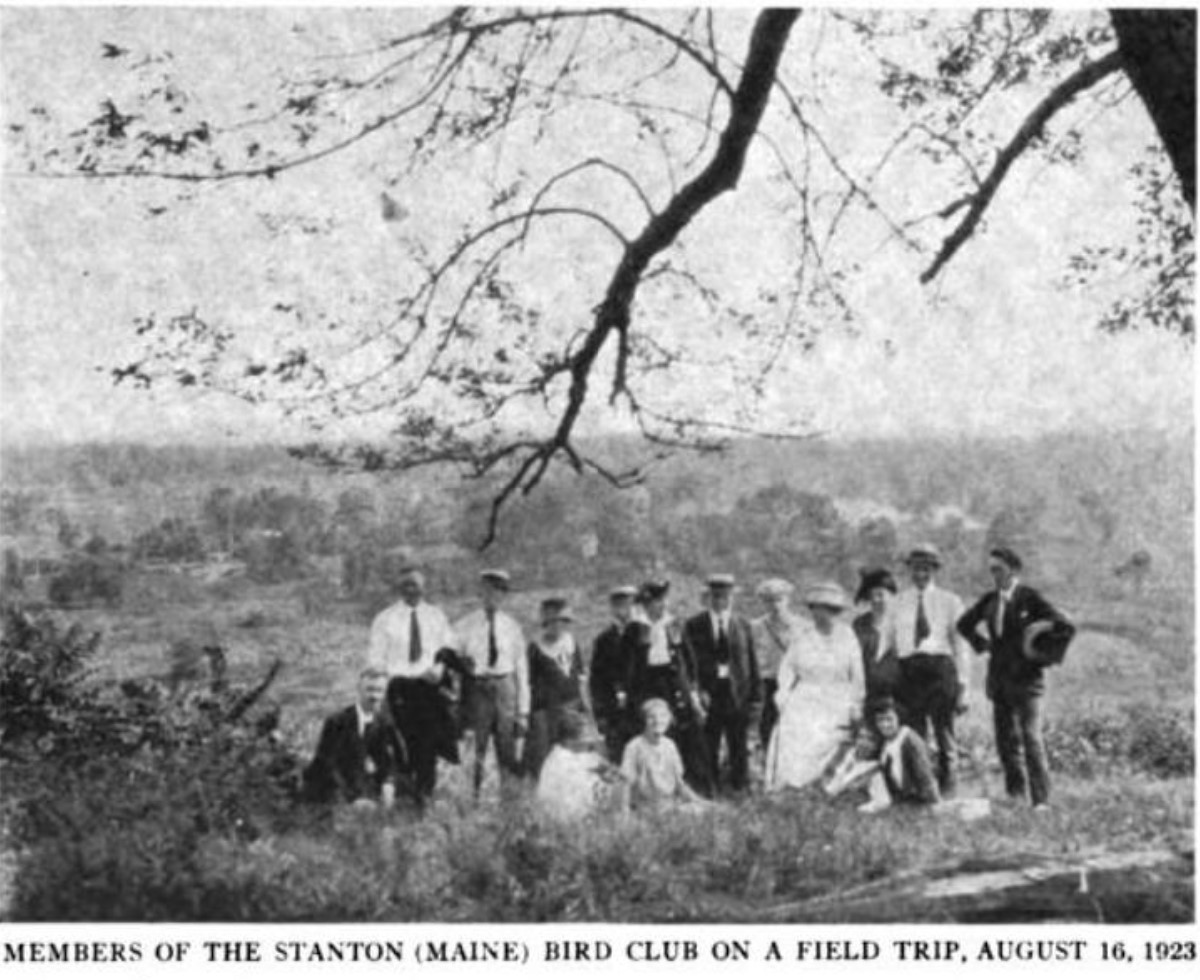
Stanton Bird Club in 1923

Thorncrag Nature Sanctuary is a 450 acre forested wildlife preserve owned and managed by the Stanton Bird Club in Lewiston, Maine, since 1921. At 510 feet high Thorncrag hill is highest point in Lewiston and contains many hiking trails.

== History ==
In the nineteenth century the area was owned by the Thorne family and was the site of the homestead of Elder Benjamin Thorne (1779–1864), a Freewill Baptist preacher who dedicated Hathorn Hall at nearby Bates College. During this time it was known as the "Crag". In 1921 the Stanton Bird Club, which was founded in 1919 in honor of Bates Professor Jonathan Stanton, received the land comprising the Sanctuary and founded the Thorncrag Nature Sanctuary with donations from another Bates professor, Alfred Williams Anthony. The name "Thorncrag" was created by Professor Anthony. Bates College has used the land for scientific research and in the past it was also used as a dairy and sheep farm, a Highland Spring bottling facility, a tuberculosis sanitorium. Today Thorncrag Nature Sanctuary is used for various educational and recreational purposes including hiking and birdwatching.
