= John Fullonton =

American politician

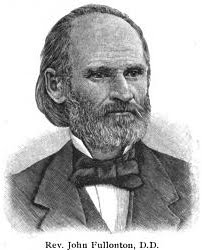
John Fullonton Free Will Baptist professor at Cobb Divinity School at Bates College in Maine

John Fullonton (1812-1896) was an American pastor, academic and legislator.

Fullonton was born in Raymond, New Hampshire in 1812. He graduated from Dartmouth College in 1840, and from the Baptist Biblical School (later renamed Cobb Divinity School at Bates College) in Whitestown, New York, in 1849. Fullonton served as principal of North Parsonsfield Seminary in 1840 and of the Whitestown Seminary in 1843. Between 1851 and 1896 Fullonton served a professor and dean in the Free Baptist Theological School, first when it was attached to the New Hampton Institute and then Bates College since 1870. Fullonton received an honorary doctor of divinity from Dartmouth in 1862. Fullonton served as chaplain of the New Hampshire Legislature in 1863 and a member of the New Hampshire House of Representatives in 1867-1868.
