= Carl Salser =

American author, businessman and educator

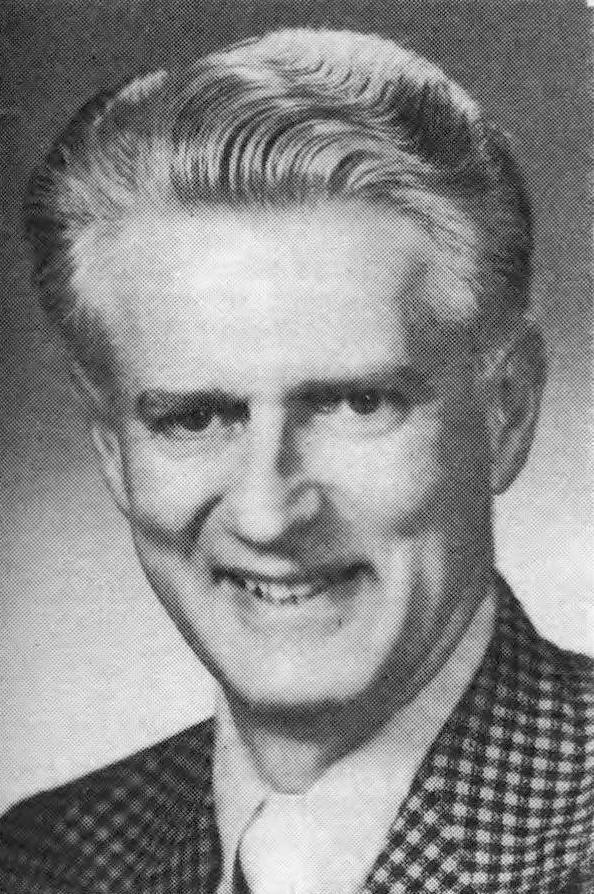
Carl W. Salser, 1974

Carl Walter Salser, Jr. (16 August 1921 – 11 April 2006) was an American author, businessperson and educator.

Salser was born in Emporia, Kansas, but grew up in Corvallis, Oregon after his father left his teaching assignment at Emporia State University to become Dean of Education at Oregon State University (OSU). Salser graduated from Corvallis High School in Oregon and later enrolled at Oregon State University.

With the outbreak of World War II he served as a Navy Corpsman, stationed at the Naval Hospital in Corona, California before being ordered to the Pacific Theater of Operations where he participated in the Battle of Okinawa. Following the war Salser joined the Naval Reserve, from which he retired as a lieutenant commander.

After the war, he graduated from Oregon State, where he also met his future wife, Barbara Anderson (1926-2000), of Lake Oswego, Oregon. They opened a men's clothing store and a restaurant that also served the training table for the OSU college football team, before joining McGraw-Hill Publishing and moving to Portland, Oregon. He received his master's degree from OSU in 1956. Also in the mid-1950s he became editor-in-chief for Allied Publishers of Portland, and in 1960 took over a college of business (then Pacific Business College, now known as Capstone English Mastery Center) before forming the 501(c)(3) nonprofit Educational Research Associates in 1965.

The author or editor of more than 100 instructional titles, Salser authored two books on educational policy, A Tyrant in Cap and Gown, and Public Education from A to Z. He co-authored numerous titles in the use of the alphabetic shorthand system known as Personal Shorthand. Beginning in 1965 he led the development of the Individualized instruction system of school and classroom management.

He was appointed by President Ronald Reagan to the National Council on Educational Research (NCER) on 28 May 1982. Confirmed by the United States Senate, he served two terms on the council.

He spent almost his entire life in Oregon. A lifelong Republican, he was manager for U.S. Senator Mark Hatfield's successful 1956 campaign for Oregon Secretary of State. He twice campaigned for a position in the Oregon House of Representatives, losing once in the primary and once in the general election.

He suffered a stroke in September 1991 and thereafter used a wheelchair. He died 11 April 2006. He was survived by three children, Mark Salser, Lori Fraser, and Linda Salser, and three grandchildren, Andrew Fraser, Alanna Fraser, and Matthew Salser.
