= Lewis Penick Clinton =

Bassa Prince missionary, lecturer (c.1865–?)

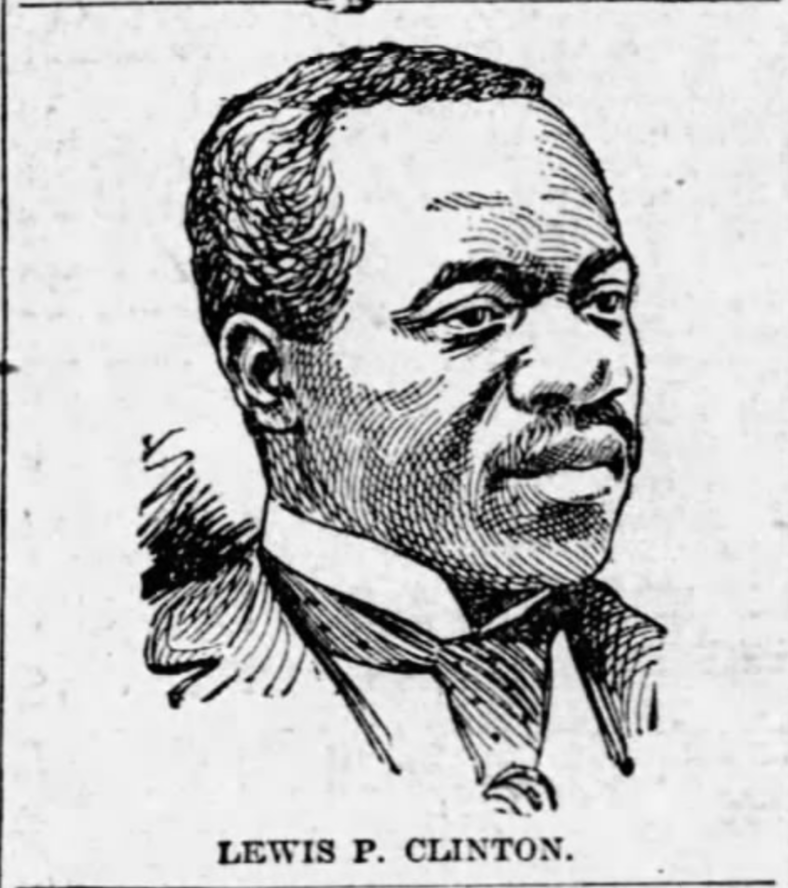
Lewis Penick Clinton, an African Prince, from article in Boston Globe

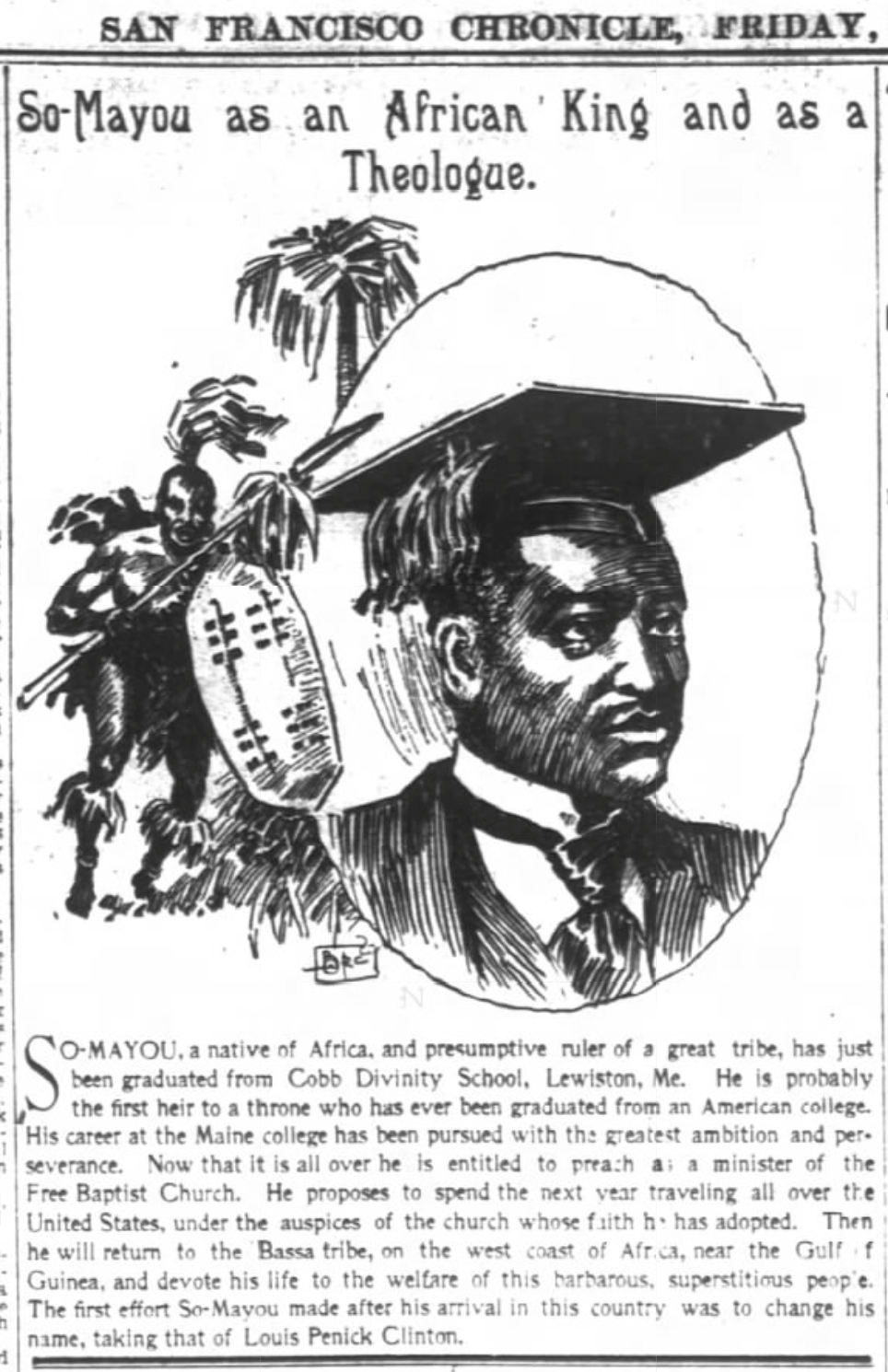
Lewis Penick Clinton, advertisement for his lectures upon graduation in 1897

Lewis Penick Clinton (also known as Louis Penick Clinton and Prince Somayou Zea Clayou) (born 1865 or 1866) was a Prince of the Bassa people in West Africa (Liberia) and later an African American missionary and lecturer.

== Early life ==
Clinton was born as Prince Somayou Zea Clayou in 1865 or 1866 in Grand Bassa where he was heir to the throne of his grandfather, Zea, the king of the Bassa, a large tribe of two million people in West Africa. Somayou's father was also a king and Somayou's mother was his father's favorite wife. A rival uncle was seeking the throne, but Somayou was being trained secretly to be a successor until his father died in 1878. Fearing for his life, Somayou fled to the Liberian coast and met an American trader named Clinton, who taught Somayou English. Somayou then was introduced to an Episcopal bishop along the road between Cape Palmas to Cape Mount. The bishop, Lewis Penick, was on his way to found a mission station and Somayou worked with the bishop for five years and adopted the name "Lewis Penick Clinton."

== Education in the United States ==
In 1884 seeking to further his education, Clinton came to the U.S. and studied at Storer College in West Virginia for five years starting in the 1880s. By 1890 Clinton had moved to Maine where he completed one year at Nichols Latin School and then attended Bates College and its affiliated Cobb Divinity School for six years. He graduated from Bates College's Cobb Divinity School in 1897 with high honors. While at Bates, Clinton was a member of the Polymnian debating society and active in social events and sports, including tennis, and he wrote for the Bates Student. He paid for his education expenses through lecturing and writing. Clinton acquired knowledge of many languages including English, French, German, Latin, Greek, Hebrew, Bassa, Kru, and Vai.

== Founding of Liberian mission ==
In 1898 Clinton was ordained as a Free Will Baptist minister, and he returned to Africa in 1899 to found a mission near Fortsville in Grand Bassa, Liberia helping to educate local men and women and to hopefully regain the throne from his uncle. His mission work was sponsored by the Free Will Baptists in Maine, and Clinton founded a mission station and farm (seventy-five miles east of Monrovia and fifty miles from the coast) upon several hundred acres of land granted by the Bassa people and Liberian government, and he was later assisted by another Storer alumnus, Rev. A.K. Peabody. The mission grew to contain dormitories and farms, and provided agricultural, mechanical and spiritual training in English (because the Bassa written language had not yet been created and translated), and in addition to the native Bassa, many Americo-Liberians also sent their children to his school. By 1917 the Northern Baptist Convention (formerly Free Will) sent Bates professor, Lyman Jordan, to formally dedicate the Bible Industrial Academy at the mission. In 1910 Clinton temporarily returned to the United States to lecture about his work, including a talk the Baptists at Ocean Park, Maine and another at Clark University in Massachusetts entitled "The Hinterland of Liberia." It is unclear what happened to Clinton after 1910 when he disappeared from known historical records.
