= Imprimis =

Monthly speech digest

- Editor: Douglas A. Jeffrey
- Frequency: monthly
- Format: online and print
- Publisher: Center for Constructive Alternatives, Hillsdale College
- Paid circulation: Free
- Founded: 1972 [1976]
- Based in: Hillsdale, Michigan
- Website: https://imprimis.hillsdale.edu/
- ISSN: 0277-8432
- OCLC: 939819107

Imprimis is the monthly speech digest of Hillsdale College, published by the Center for Constructive Alternatives. Salon.com described it as "the most influential conservative publication you've never heard of." Its name is Latin, meaning both 'in the first place' and the second person singular of the verb to print.

== History ==
Imprimis was founded in 1972 by Clark Durant and George Roche III as a free alumni service. Lew Rockwell was an early editor. Hillsdale's then-President George Roche III initially sent 1,000 issues to "friends of the College." The publication improved Hillsdale's name recognition and did "wonders for out-of-state enrollment" as its circulation "ballooned." By the 1980s, Imprimis and Hillsdale were "closely associated with intellectual ferment on the right".

Hillsdale College claims that Imprimis's readership has grown to over 6.8 million as of 2025. It is a free publication but encourages donations. Distribution is no longer limited to alumni.

Imprimis's content consists almost entirely of edited transcripts of speeches delivered by conservative movement leaders at Hillsdale-sponsored events.

In 1991, the dean at Boston University, H. Joachim Maitre, was accused of plagiarizing an Imprimis article by Michael Medved in a commencement address, which led to Maitre's resignation.

Contributors to Imprimis have included Jeb Bush, Ward Connerly, Dinesh D'Souza, Milton Friedman, Victor Davis Hanson, Jack Kemp, Irving Kristol, Rush Limbaugh, Bjorn Lomborg, David McCullough, Richard John Neuhaus, Sarah Palin, Ronald Reagan, Jason L. Riley, Margaret Thatcher, Clarence Thomas, and Tom Wolfe.

== Reception ==
Imprimis has been praised by conservatives. For instance, Walter E. Williams wrote that Imprimis is "Hillsdale's way of sharing the ideas of the many distinguished speakers invited to their campus. And, I might add, Hillsdale College is one of the few colleges where students get a true liberal arts education, absent the nonsense seen on many campuses."

In contrast, Mark W. Powell, writing in the Toledo Blade, criticized Imprimis for eschewing fact-checking and failing to issue editorial corrections, which he described as part of a pattern of "cavalierism with facts to drive political points." Jordan Smith of Salon offered similar criticisms, citing a piece by Republican representative Paul Ryan that he said repeated a "widely discredited assertion" regarding health care rationing under Obama's health insurance reforms. Kevin D. Williamson at National Review argued that speech transcripts ordinarily aren't fact-checked or verified for the truth of their claims.
