= Jonathan Stanton =

American ornithologist

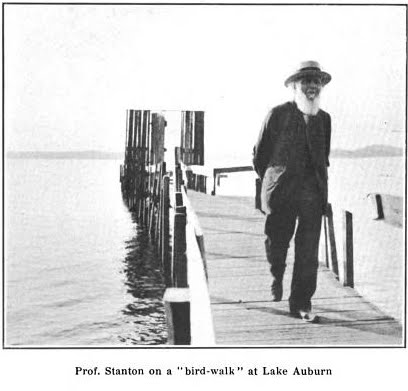
Professor John Stanton of Bates College on a bird walk in Maine at Lake Auburn

Jonathan Stanton (1834–1918) was an American ornithologist and academic. He taught Greek and Latin at Bates College, where he was a librarian and a supporter of the debate program.

== Career ==
A native of Lebanon, Maine, USA, and an 1856 graduate of Bowdoin College, Stanton studied law from 1856 to 1857 and became a teacher at the New Hampton School in New Hampshire from 1857 to 1858. He studied at Andover Theological Seminary from 1858 to 1861. He was the principal of the Pinkerton Academy in Derry, New Hampshire, from 1861 to 1863. He then went to Bates College where his brother, Levi, had been teaching.

Stanton taught at Bates from 1863 until his death in 1918. He taught Greek and Latin, led debates and taught a popular class in ornithology. Stanton maintained a correspondence with Charles Darwin and some of Darwin's letters have survived. The local Stanton Bird Club is still active and owns the Thorncrag Nature Sanctuary. The "Stanton Ride", where Stanton paid to have horses and carriages take the freshman class on a picnic where he would tell them the history of the college, continued as a tradition for over 100 years. Referred to by students as "Uncle Johnny" and by college president George C. Chase as "the spirit of Bates", Stanton refused to leave Bates for any other colleges and remains one of the school's most influential professors to this day. Stanton was influential in creating a strong debate tradition at Bates with the creation of debate prizes and supporting the literary and debate societies, such as the Polymnian and Eurosophian Societies in the early years of the school. Stanton's large collection of bird specimens was mainly sent from Bates to the Maine State Museum in 1980, but several specimens remain on campus.
