= Lake Auburn =

Lake in Maine, United States

- Location within Maine
- Location: Auburn, Maine
- Coordinates: 44°08′49″N 70°15′00″W
- Type: reservoir
- Primary inflows: Basin Brook, Townsend Brook
- Primary outflows: East Auburn Dam
- Catchment area: 15.3 square miles (40 km^{2})
- Basin countries: United States
- Surface area: 2,260 acres (910 ha)
- Average depth: 40 feet (12 m)
- Max. depth: 118 ft (36 m)
- Water volume: 90,000 acre⋅ft (110,000,000 m^{3})
- Residence time: 3.8-4.75 years
- Shore length^{1}: 12.2 miles (19.6 km)
- Surface elevation: 259 ft (79 m)
- ^{1} Shore length is not a well-defined measure.

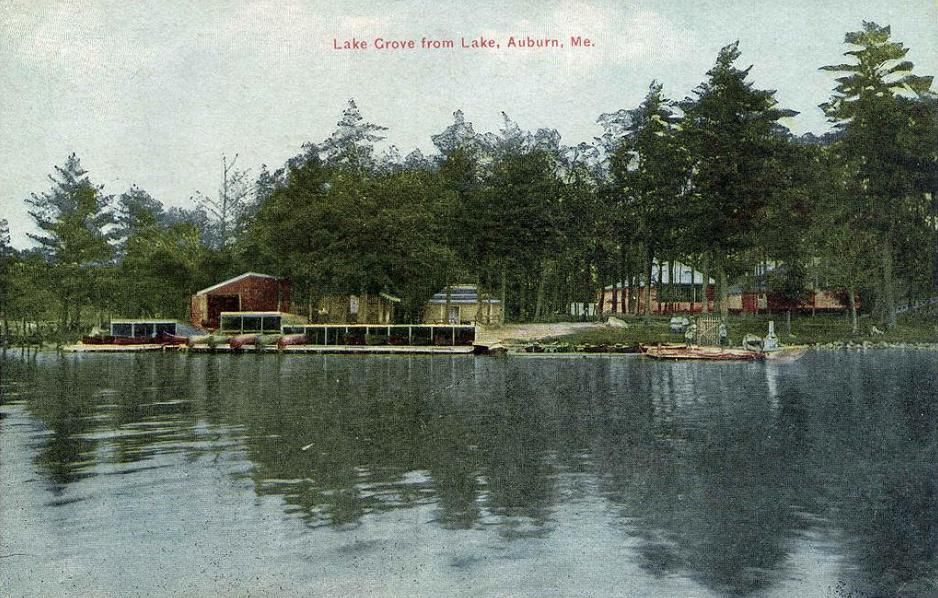
Lake Auburn in 1911

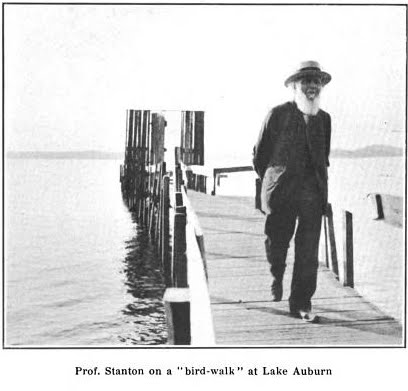
Professor Jonathan Stanton of Bates College on a bird walk in Maine at Lake Auburn

Lake Auburn is a lake and reservoir in Auburn, Maine. The Lake has a total area of 2,260 acres (910 ha) and a maximum depth of 118 feet (36 m). It is the water supply for the Lewiston-Auburn area. The lake is closed to most recreational activity, including ice fishing and swimming. In 2013, the Lake experienced several small algal blooms, though the fishing conditions and local water supply were not extensively harmed by the change in conditions. Some of Maine's most sought after fish species are found in the lake, including Salmon, Lake Trout, and Brook Trout. In recent years, Lake Auburn has also seen rising populations of warm water fish species such as Largemouth Bass and Chain Pickerel, which are now thriving in soft, shallow areas of the lake. The rise of warmwater fish in the lake may have an impact on native Coldwater fishes in the near future.
