= Moses Smart =

Moses Smart (1812–1873) was an American pastor, professor, medical doctor, attorney, and first leader of what was later known as Cobb Divinity School at Bates College.

Moses Mighels Smart was born in 1812 in North Parsonsfield, Maine and graduated from Waterville College (1836) (now Colby College) and then from the Bangor Theological Seminary (1839) then Andover Theological Seminary (1840), and then from the Central Medical College (1850). He also studied law, and was admitted to the New York bar in 1843. In 1840 he became the first leader of the first Free Will Baptist Theological School (later known as Cobb Divinity School) which was first located in Parsonsfield, Maine attached to Parsonfield Seminary before moving to Lowell, Massachusetts, and then Whitestown, New York and eventually merging with Bates College. Smart led the institution until 1849 and later led his own school for a period. He preached in Russia, New York for several years. He then returned to Whitesboro in 1866 and taught ancient languages at Whitestown Seminary until 1871. Smart died in Whitestown, New York in 1873 of consumption. Smart published several works, including "Biblical Doctrine," “A Chronological History from the Creation of the World to the Present Century," "Moral Philosophy," and “Elements of Hebrew."
