= John Jay Butler =

American minister and theologian (1814–1891)

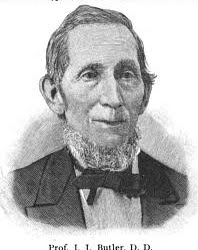
John Jay Butler theologian at Bates College and Hillsdale College

John Jay Butler (April 9, 1814 – 1891) was an ordained minister and theologian in the early Free Will Baptist movement in New England, serving as Professor of Systematic Theology at Cobb Divinity School at Bates College in Maine and later at Hillsdale College in Michigan.

== Biography ==
He was born in Berwick, Maine and graduated at Bowdoin College in 1837. Following his graduation, he began teaching, including for several months as an assistant teacher in the Parsonsfield Seminary. Butler graduated from Andover Theological Seminary in 1844 and then became a professor of systematic theology in the Whitestown Seminary at Whitestown, New York from 1844 to 1854 in the school's graduate department, which later became known as Cobb Divinity School at Bates College. In 1854 when the school moved to New Hampshire he continued to hold the professorship of systematic theology in the seminary at New Hampton, New Hampshire for 16 years, and starting in 1870 at Bates College at Lewiston, Maine for 3 years when the school moved there. In 1860, Bowdoin College granted him the degree of Doctor of Divinity.

In 1873, Butler was appointed chair of Hebrew Language and Literature at Hillsdale College where he taught until his death in 1891.

== Writings ==
In 1834, Butler became the assistant editor of The Morning Star, a Free Will Baptist publication.

He was also the author of several notable theological works:

- Natural and Revealed Theology (Dover, New Hampshire, 1861)
- Commentary on the New Testament (1870)
- Commentary on the Acts, Romans, and First and Second Corinthians (1871)
- Lectures on systematic theology: embracing the existence and attributes of God, the authority and doctrine of the scriptures, the institutions and ordinances of the gospel (with Ransom Dunn, 1892)
