= Slayton Arboretum =

Botanical garden in Hillsdale County, Michigan, USA

Coordinates: 41.93514°N 84.62801°W

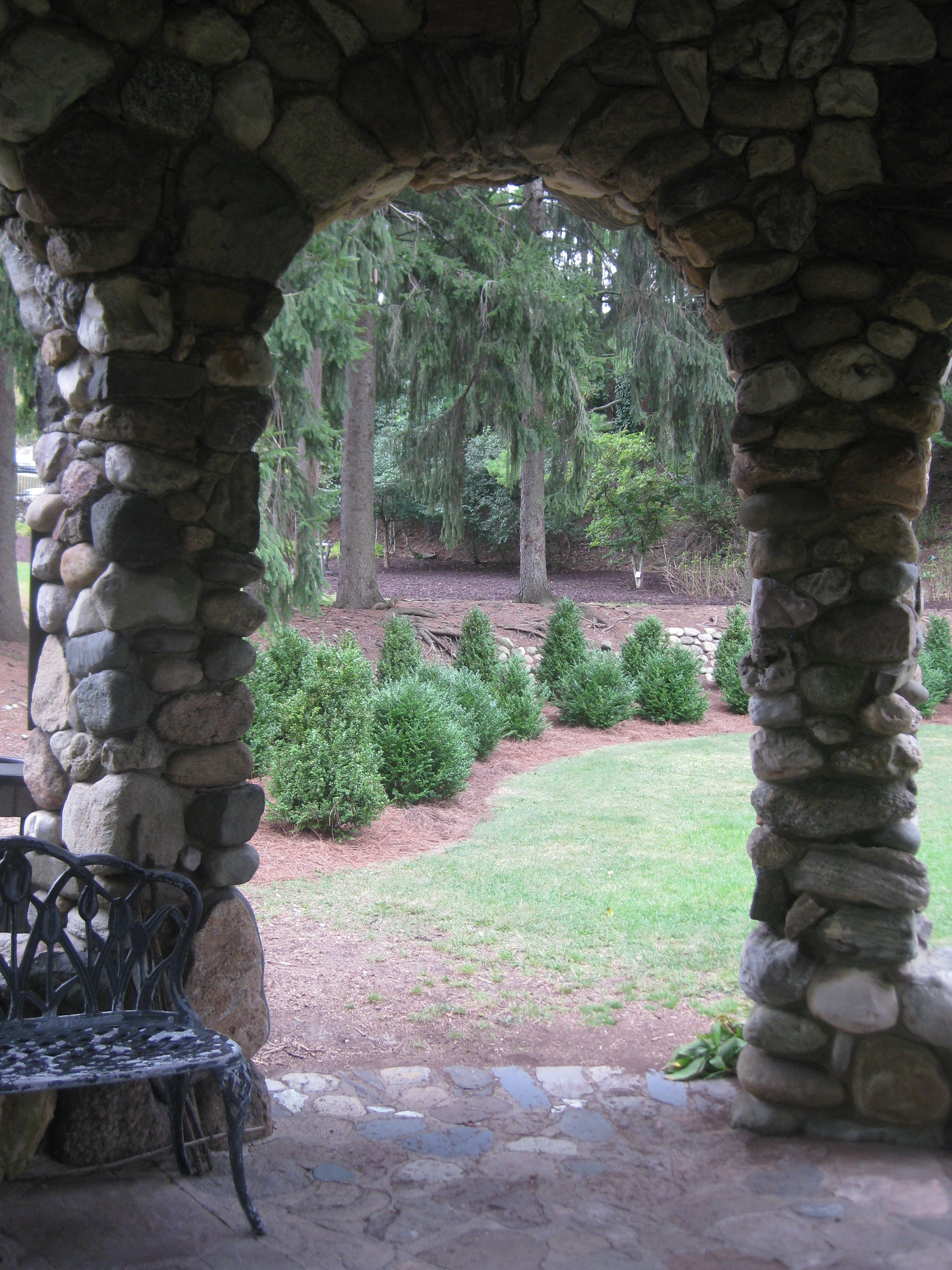

Slayton Arboretum, 14 acres (5.7 hectares), is an arboretum located adjacent to the campus of Hillsdale College in Hillsdale, Michigan. It is privately owned but open to the public.

Although the site's use by the College students dates back to at least the 1860s, the Arboretum began in 1922 when Mr. and Mrs. George A. Slayton donated 14 acres (5.7 hectares) to Hillsdale College. By 1924, the first donated plantings were in place, led by Professor Bertram A. Barber. A pond was excavated in 1928, and a field station, a hillside rock garden, waterfall, and pump house were added in 1929. In the early 1930s two bridges were added, and an amphitheater built in the late 1930s on the site of a former gravel pit.

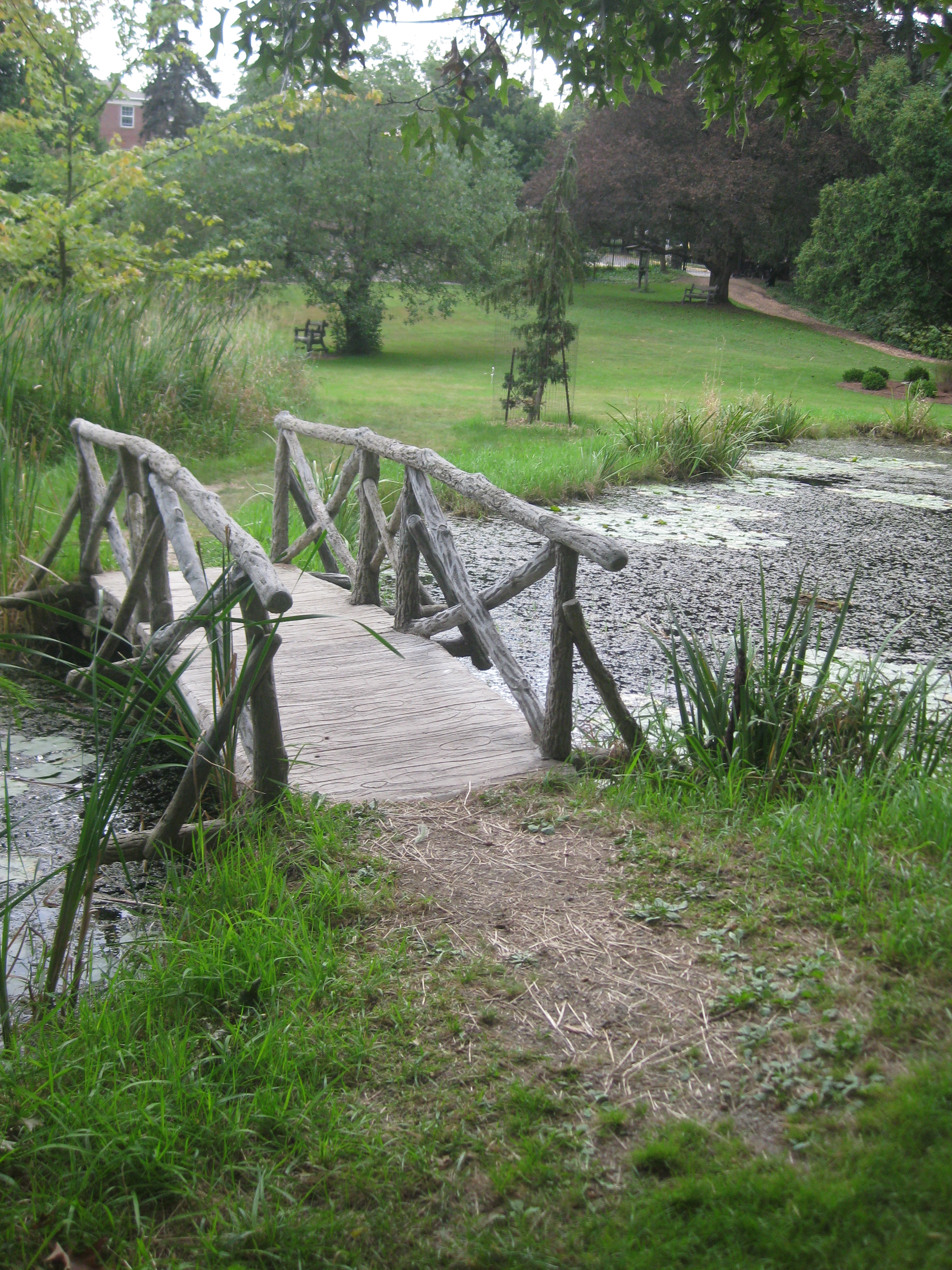

On October 17, 1999 the Arboretum was the site of a suicide or murder when Lissa Jackson Roche, the managing editor of Hillsdale College Press, was found dead of a gunshot wound after claiming that she and her father-in-law, the college's president, had been involved in a nineteen-year extramarital affair.

The initial period of development of Slayton Arboretum under Professor Barber resulted in an intimate botanical garden much loved by students and alumni of Hillsdale College as well as the residents of Hillsdale. It was the focal point for student outdoor activity in biology and ecology. The rock gardens, waterfalls, gazebos, amphitheater and rustic cement bridges have survived virtually intact. The arboretum occupies the site of a disused gravel pit, and it is the distinct topography of the site along with the coniferous trees planted during Barber's directorship that provide the garden with its special charm. These original plantings matured over forty years of benign neglect following the demise of Professor Barber.

In the early 1990s the arboretum was re-discovered as an important asset to the college and recovery of the site was begun under the direction of Dr. David Crabtree. Alumni and student support for the renewal of plantings and the conservation of the original structural elements was important in the restoration of the gardens during this time period. Today the gardens are notable for stately mature trees, semi-natural settings, and collections of conifers, magnolia, viburnum, witchhazel, mountain ash, maple, oak, and hickory as well as several genera of hardy deciduous shrubs.

The site is of considerable interest to ecologists in that several species of exotic woody shrubs have naturalized in the area to the exclusion of the native woody flora. The exotic shrubs that have become rampant are common buckthorn and common privet. Preferential deer herbivory of native species seems to be the primary cause of this invasion, and a deer exclusion has been attempted. The arboretum also has heavy and repeated infestation with Japanese beetle and this may also play a role in the dynamics of the shrub community which has developed in the garden over the last seventy years. The arboretum is currently directed by Dr. Ranessa Cooper and hosts art programs and children's programs during the summer.

As of late 2013 the arboretum underwent a renovation. The college has added a waterfall and the arboretum is open to the public once again.

== See also ==
- List of botanical gardens in the United States
