= Cobb Divinity School =

- Cobb Divinity School's facility from 1870 to 1895. The building now serves as John Bertram Hall on the campus of Bates College

Location
- Parsonsfield, Maine; Lewiston, Maine
- Coordinates: 44°06′13″N 70°12′05″W

Information
- Founded: March 12, 1840
- Closed: March 23, 1908 (merged with Bates religion department)

Cobb Divinity School (also known as Bates Theological Seminary or the Free Will Baptist Bible School) was a Baptist theological institute. Founded in 1840, it was a Free Will Baptist graduate school affiliated with several Free Baptist institutions throughout its history. Cobb was part of Bates College in Lewiston, Maine, United States from 1870 until 1908 when it merged with the college's Religion Department.

The school created one of the first models for a Bible school in the United States. The school had a close relationship with the University of Chicago with many Baptist theology students and faculty going back and forth between the schools.

== History ==
The divinity school was founded by the Free Will Baptists in Parsonsfield, Maine, in 1840 as a library department and graduate bible school of the Parsonsfield Seminary with Moses Smart serving as the first leader of the school. From 1842 to 1844, the divinity school was located in Dracut, Massachusetts. In 1844, the divinity school moved again to Whitestown, New York, and became part of the Whitestown Seminary, where it was known as the Free Baptist Biblical School. From 1854 to 1870, the divinity school was located in New Hampton, New Hampshire, and affiliated with the New Hampton Institute.

The school and its library were removed to Lewiston in 1870 and became a graduate school (known as Bates Theological Seminary until 1888) of Bates College. In 1888, it was renamed Cobb Divinity School in honor of Jonathan Leavitt Haskell Cobb (1824-1897), a prominent businessman at the Bates Mill in Lewiston who had donated $25,000 to the Divinity School at Bates. In 1891, President of Bates College Oren B. Cheney amended the school's charter requiring that Bates' president and a majority of the trustees be Free Will Baptists. Following Cheney's retirement, the amendment was revoked in 1907 at the request of his successor, President George C. Chase, and the board of trustees. In 1907, the Maine Legislature amended the college's charter removing the requirement for the president and majority of the trustees to be Free Will Baptists, thereby allowing the school to qualify for Carnegie Foundation funding of professor's pensions. Cobb Divinity School was disbanded in 1908, with much of its curricula and faculty and library becoming the Bates College Religion Department. In 1911, the Northern Free Will Baptist Conference merged with the Northern Baptist Convention (a former name of the American Baptist Churches USA). Bates remained nominally affiliated with the Baptist tradition until 1970 when the college catalogue no longer described the school as a "Christian college".

== Images ==
Cobb Divinity School faculty, ca. 1895, featuring Professors John Fullonton, Alfred W. Anthony, Herbert R. Purinton, James A. Howe, and Benjamin F. Hayes

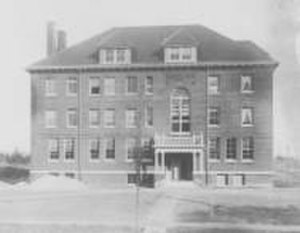
Cobb Divinity School building from 1894-1908. Currently Roger Williams Hall on the campus of Bates College

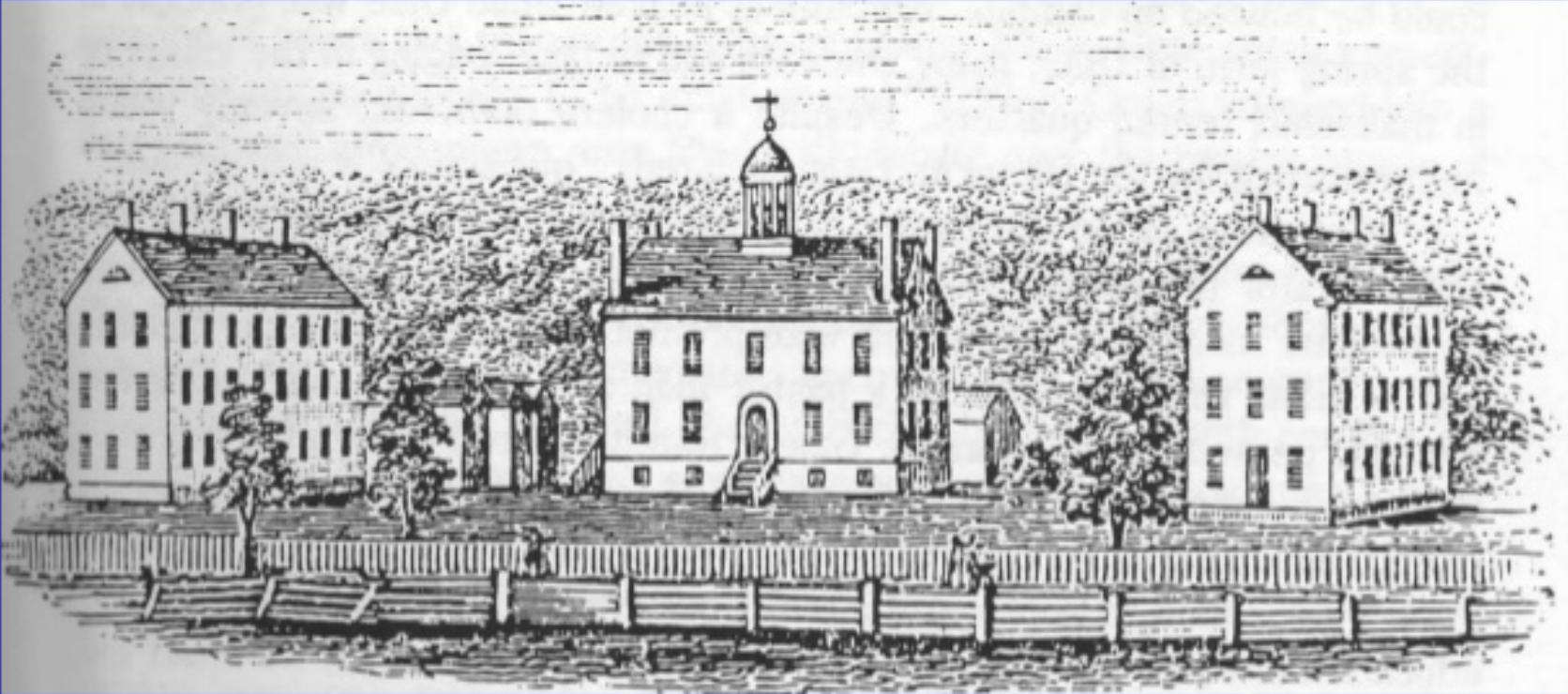
School buildings which were located in New York on the former Oneida Institute campus in Whitesboro, New York

== Notable people ==
- Alfred W. Anthony (1885), pastor, professor, and author
- George H. Ball (1847), pastor, teacher of President James A. Garfield and First Lady Lucretia Garfield
- John Jay Butler, Arminian theologian, professor at Cobb and Hillsdale
- George Colby Chase, second president of Bates College
- Oren B. Cheney (1846), abolitionist, founder of Bates College
- Lewis Penick Clinton (1897), African Bassa prince, missionary in Liberia
- George T. Day (1847), pastor, writer at the Morning Star, Trustee at Bates College
- Ransom Dunn (1840), President of Rio Grande College and Hillsdale College, teacher of President James A. Garfield
- John Fullonton (1849), Professor and Dean at Cobb Divinity School
- Frank Sandford, preacher, founder of "The Kingdom"

== See also ==
- Smithville Seminary
