= Ransom Dunn =

American minister and theologian

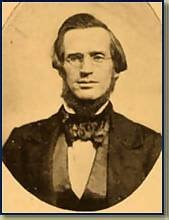
Ransom Dunn

Rev. Ransom Dunn, D.D. (July 7, 1818 – November 9, 1900) (nickname: "the Grand Old Man of Hillsdale") was an American minister and theologian, prominent in the early Free Will Baptist movement in New England. He was President of Rio Grande College in Ohio. A Discourse on the Freedom of the Will is one of his most notable works.

== Early years ==
Dunn was born in the town of Bakersfield, in the north corner of Vermont to John and Abigail Reed Dunn, a family of English and Scots descent. Three brothers, Hiram, Lewis, and Thomas, also became ministers; there were at least two older half-brothers, Joab and John. He had at least one sister, Amanda Dunn Montague.

Around 1840 Dunn attended the Baptist Seminary (later named Cobb Divinity School at Bates College) in New Hampton, New Hampshire. In 1873 he received an honorary doctorate from Bates College in Maine, which was then affiliated with the seminary.

== Career ==
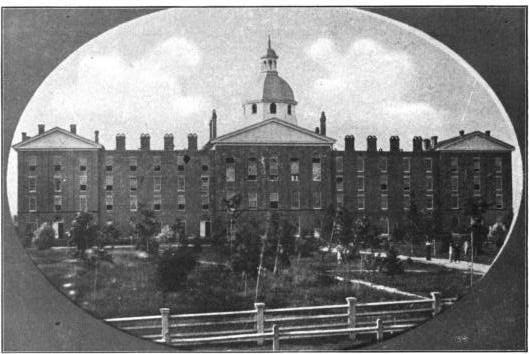
Hillsdale College photo from, A consecrated life, a sketch of the life and labors of Rev. Ransom Dunn, D.D., 1818–1900

On the third Sabbath in August, 1837, Ransom Dunn, at the request of the Lenox church, was ordained to the gospel ministry. Among his most important pastorates were in the cities of Dover, New Hampshire, Great Falls, New Hampshire, New York City, and Boston, Massachusetts. By 1843, he was recording secretary of the Home Mission Society. In 1849, he began preaching at the Stuyvesant Institute in New York City. He became a pastor of the Free Will Baptist Church of Boston.

He is known for his publication A Discourse on the Freedom of the Will, published in 1850. With John Jay Butler, he published Lectures on systematic theology: embracing the existence and attributes of God, the authority and doctrine of the scriptures, the polllinstitutions and ordinances of the gospel in 1892. Dunn once mused, "The real value of colleges and universities is not to be estimated by the magnitude of buildings or endowments, but by the increase of mental power and moral force."

Dunn taught at Geauga Seminary (where he taught future president James Garfield and First Lady Lucretia Garfield), and he was a professor at Central Michigan College in Spring Arbor, MI, which later moved and was renamed Hillsdale College. He was the first President (1876–1879) as well as professor of mental and moral philosophy at Rio Grande College. He was later the president of Hillsdale College, Michigan, its dean, Burr professor of Christian Theology, and professor emeritus of moral theology. Dunn secured the school's original financial support by riding on horseback for thousands of miles through the frontier lands of Michigan, Minnesota, and Wisconsin in the early 1850s, gathering donations. In Minneapolis in 1882, at the 25th General Conference of the Free-will Baptist Church, Dunn was chosen to be the moderator.

== Personal life ==
In 1838, he met a relative of Ethan Allen, Mary Eliza Allen, and they married in Ohio soon thereafter. They had three children. Sons Newell Ransom Dunn (1841–1863) and Francis Wayland Dunn (Wayne, Ohio 1843–1874) both served in the Civil War. The youngest was a daughter, Cedelia Dunn (1845–1858).

In September 1849, he married Cyrena A. Emery in Dover, New Hampshire; and they lived in Boston. They had at least three children, daughters, S. Abbie Dunn Slayton, Helen ("Nellie") Dunn Gates, and Nettie Dunn. Daughter Helen was the author of A consecrated life, a sketch of the life and labors of Rev. Ransom Dunn, D. D., 1818–1900. Dunn died in 1900 in Scranton, Pennsylvania.

== Partial works ==
- (1850), A Discourse on the Freedom of the Will
- (1892), Lectures on systematic theology: embracing the existence and attributes of God, the authority and doctrine of the scriptures, the institutions and ordinances of the gospel

== Bibliography ==
- The Twentieth Century Biographical Dictionary of Notable Americans; John Howard Brown, 1904
