= George Roche III =

American academic (1935–2006)

George Charles Roche III (May 16, 1935 – May 5, 2006) was an American academic. He was the 11th president of Hillsdale College, serving from 1971 to 1999. He was led to resign after a scandal surrounding an alleged sexual affair between him and his daughter-in-law, Lissa Jackson Roche, and her subsequent suicide.

Roche received his bachelor's degree from Regis College (now Regis University) in 1956. He served as an officer in the Marine Corps for two years from 1956 to 1958. He later received a master's and Ph.D. from the University of Colorado Boulder.

Before becoming president of Hillsdale College, Roche was a professor at the Colorado School of Mines. He also worked with the Foundation for Economic Education.

The Center for Constructive Alternatives seminar program and the college's widely circulated speech digest, Imprimis, were started during Roche's years as college president. Under his leadership, many new buildings were constructed, including a sports complex that bears his name. Roche authored many books, such as Legacy of Freedom, The Bewildered Society, and The Book of Heroes. Lissa is sometimes listed as a co-author of The Book of Heroes and is acknowledged as a major contributor in its introduction.

Ronald Reagan appointed Roche chairman of the National Council on Educational Research in 1984.

== Personal life ==
Roche's first wife was June Roche, and they had four children together. In 1971, when Roche became president of Hillsdale College, the family moved to Michigan. In 1999, the Roches divorced, and George remarried that same year.

Scandal broke out upon George's remarriage, still in 1999, when his daughter-in-law, Lissa Jackson Roche, claimed to have had an affair with him spanning 19 years. She threatened suicide, and her husband found her in the college arboretum with a handgun and her blood still warm; he was unable to prevent her self-inflicted death. Roche was placed on leave of absence, but resigned nine days later and left public life. The widely publicized scandal brought national attention to Roche and Hillsdale. The 2000 book Hillsdale: Greek Tragedy in America's Heartland explores the events and questions whether Lissa Roche's death was actually suicide. Roche denied Lissa's allegations.

After the scandal, Roche moved to a remote cabin in Colorado. He visited Michigan briefly in 2005 to celebrate his 70th birthday. He died on May 5, 2006, in Louisville, Kentucky.

== Bibliography ==
- "American Federalism" (1967, Foundation for Economic Education)
- Legacy of Freedom (1969)
- Education in America (1969)
- Frederic Bastiat: A Man Alone. Architects of Freedom Series. New Rochelle: Arlington House. 1971.
- The Bewildered Society (1972)
- The Balancing Act: Quota Hiring in Higher Education (1974)
- Federal Assault on Independent Education (1979)
- America by the Throat: The Stranglehold of Federal Bureaucracy (1983)
- Going Home (1986)
- A World Without Heroes: The Modern Tragedy (1987)
- A Reason for Living (1989)
- The Fall of the Ivory Tower: Government Funding, Corruption, and the Bankrupting of American Higher Education (1994)
- The Book of Heroes: Great Men and Women in American History (1998)
- Ellis, Jonathon (January 19, 2000). "Sex, lies and suicide". Salon. Archived from the original on February 15, 2012.
- Michaelsen, Mark G. "Remembering George Roche" The American Spectator May 12, 2006.
- Miller, John J. "Horror at Hillsdale" National Review November 12, 1999.
- Van der Werf, Martin. "A Scandal and a Suicide Leave a College Reeling," Chronicle of Higher Education, November 19, 1999. Sub-title: “Hillsdale president quits amid rumors of affair with his daughter-in-law, who killed herself.”
- Ronald Reagan papers nominations listings for March 8, 1984 Archived October 24, 2012, at the Wayback Machine
