= Daniel McBride Graham =

First president of Hillsdale College (1817- 1888)

Daniel McBride Graham (1817–1888) was a Free Will Baptist pastor, abolitionist, writer, and inventor who served as the first president of Hillsdale College, serving from 1844 to 1848 and the fourth president from 1871 to 1874.

Graham was born in 1817 in Milan, Ohio and worked on his family's farm. In 1843 he graduated from Oberlin College. He served as the first president of Michigan Central College (later to become Hillsdale College) in Spring Arbor, Michigan when it was established in 1844 with five students. Graham left the presidency in 1848 to a pastor a Baptist church in Saco, Maine. After a year and six months he left to serve as pastor of the First Free Will Baptist Church of New York City for twelve years. In 1861 he became pastor of a Free Will Baptist church in Portland, Maine for six years. Graham served a founding trustee of Bates College in Maine in 1864 when it incorporated as a college affiliated with the Free Will Baptists. In 1867 he moved to Chicago at the request of family and served a Free Will Baptist church there for two years. After that, Graham worked in the real estate business until 1870 when he briefly pastored a church in Taunton, Massachusetts before accepting a second term as president of Hillsdale College in 1871 serving until 1875 when he moved back to Chicago to work in real estate until 1879. He then moved to Philadelphia. He was an active writer for the Morning Star, The Free Baptist, and the Baptist Quarterly Review for most of his life. Graham also studied chemistry and received eleven patents, including patents for a steam generator, steam boiler, heating device and device for vaporizing and burning petroleum. He was an abolitionist before the Civil War and strong supporter of temperance and women's education and suffrage. Graham was survived by a widow and three children. He died in Philadelphia, Pennsylvania in 1888 and was interred in Mount Moriah Cemetery.

== Writings ==
- The Life of Clement Phinney (1851)
