= Hillsdale College =

Christian college in Hillsdale, Michigan, US

- Former name: Michigan Central College (1844–1855)
- Motto: Latin: Virtus Tentamine Gaudet
- Motto in English: Strength Rejoices in the Challenge
- Type: Private liberal arts college
- Established: December 4, 1844; 181 years ago
- Religious affiliation: Nonsectarian Christian; Baptist (historical)
- Endowment: $900 million (2021)
- President: Larry P. Arnn
- Provost: Christopher VanOrman
- Undergraduates: 1,573
- Location: Hillsdale, Michigan, U.S. 41°55′59″N 84°38′01″W
- Campus: 400 acres (160 ha) (84 buildings); Rural
- Colors: Navy blue and white
- Nickname: Chargers
- Sporting affiliations: NCAA Division II – G-MAC
- Website: hillsdale.edu

Hillsdale College is a private Christian liberal arts college in Hillsdale, Michigan, United States. It was founded in 1844 by members of the Free Will Baptists. Women were admitted to the college from its foundation, making the college the second-oldest coeducational institution in the United States, after Oberlin College (1837).

A conservative institution, Hillsdale's required core curriculum includes courses on the Great Books, the U.S. Constitution, theology, biology, chemistry, and physics. The college's mission statement identifies it as a "nonsectarian Christian institution". Since the late 20th century, in order to opt out of government mandates tied to funding, Hillsdale has declined both state and federal financial support. Instead, Hillsdale depends entirely on private donations to supplement students' tuition.

== History ==
=== Founding ===
Members of the Free Will Baptist Church founded their denomination's first collegiate institution, Michigan Central College in Spring Arbor, Michigan, in 1844. The state of Michigan incorporated the college the following year, during which the college enrolled 25 undergraduates. The college was officially non-sectarian. Its first president was Daniel McBride Graham, who held the office from 1844 to 1848.

Edmund Burke Fairfield assumed the school's presidency in 1848, and in 1850, the college was chartered to confer degrees. Black students were admitted immediately after the college's founding, and the college became the second school in the nation to grant four-year liberal arts degrees to women.

Outgrowing its space by 1853, the school moved to Hillsdale, Michigan, in part to have access to the railroad that served the city. It received financial support from residents who wanted to develop the 20-year-old town. Construction was completed and the school reopened as Hillsdale College in 1855.

Fairfield led Hillsdale for 25 years, from 1848 to 1869. In 1854, he attended the first convention of the new Republican Party with Ransom Dunn in neighboring Jackson, Michigan. Fairfield served in the Michigan Senate from 1857 to 1859, and was elected that year as Lieutenant Governor of Michigan. Hillsdale's early anti-slavery stance and its pivotal role in founding the Republican Party led to the invitation of several notable speakers on the campus, including Frederick Douglass (who visited the school on two occasions) and Edward Everett, the orator who spoke after Abraham Lincoln at Gettysburg. On August 8, 1860, Hillsdale conferred its first degrees. On March 20, 1863, the Michigan legislature formally legalized Hillsdale's change of name and location.

=== Later 19th century ===
In 1861, many Hillsdale students joined the ranks of the Union Army during the American Civil War. A higher percentage of Hillsdale students enlisted than from any other Michigan college.

In 1869, James Calder succeeded Fairfield as president. Calder served through 1871. During his administration, the commercial school opened, a theological department was established, and the college enrolled around 750 students. He resigned to become president of Pennsylvania State University.

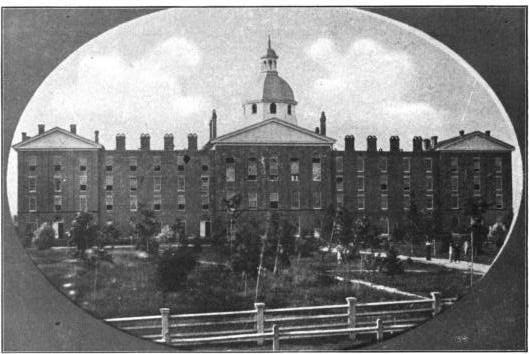
Hillsdale in the nineteenth century

Hillsdale's first president, Daniel McBride Graham, returned for a brief second term in 1871, notably rebuilding the campus after the catastrophic "Great Fire" of March 6, 1874. DeWitt Clinton Durgin, a Union College alumnus, was president from 1874 to 1884. In 1878, the Hillsdale Herald was launched, becoming the second oldest college newspaper in Michigan, behind Kalamazoo College's The Index (1877). In 1896, this paper merged with The Collegian (founded in 1893) to become The Herald-Collegian, soon simplified to The Collegian. In 1884, Spencer O. Fisher became the first Hillsdale alumnus elected to Congress.

George F. Mosher served as president of Hillsdale from 1886 to 1901. During this time, the college grew in size and in 1891, the Chicago Herald wrote, "Hillsdale has a college second in standing to no denominational college in the country."

=== 20th century ===
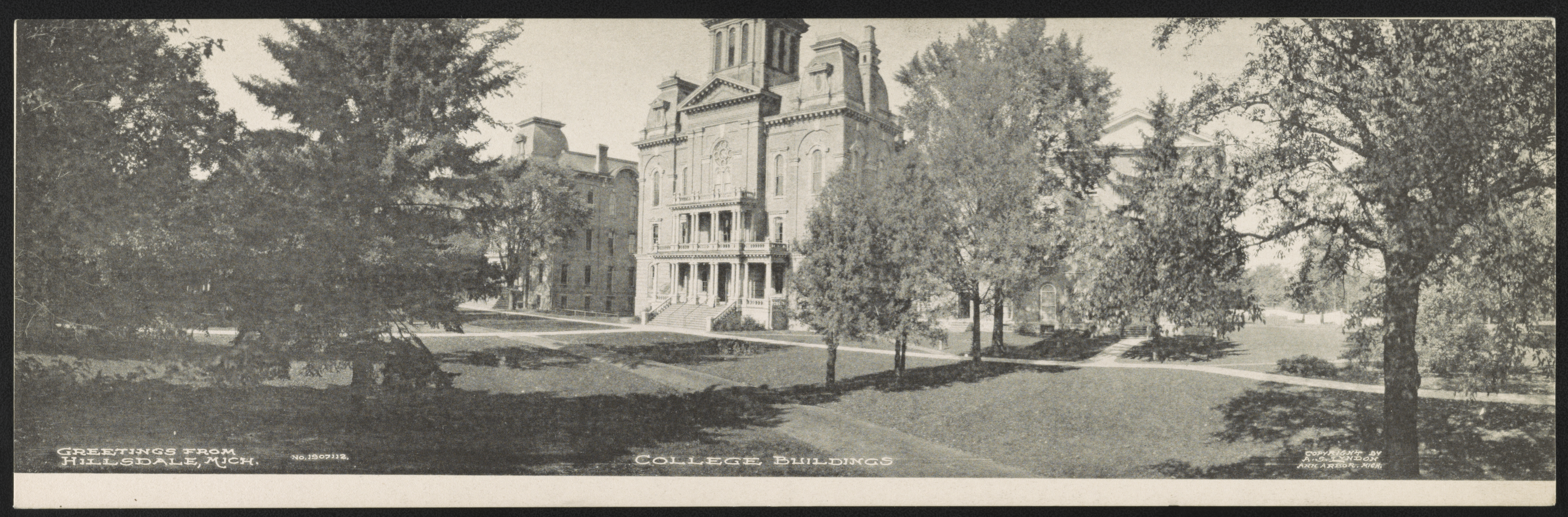
Central Hall (1908)

In 1900, Hillsdale ceased grazing livestock and removed the agrarian fence circling the campus. It began an era of institutional growth and professionalization. In 1902, Joseph William Mauck became the college's sixth president, the first Hillsdale graduate to return as president of his alma mater. Beloved by the college community and an early and outspoken advocate for women's suffrage, Mauck served for two decades. One of the women's dormitories is named after Mauck. In 1907, the college amended its Articles of Association, no longer requiring the president and trustees to be Free Will Baptists. This led to a decline in the theological department's prestige but an increase in the number of Christian denominations represented on campus.

William Gear Spencer succeeded Mauck as president, serving from 1922 to 1932, when he departed to lead Franklin College. Under Spencer, Hillsdale acquired its 14-acre (5.7 ha) Slayton Arboretum, built new dormitories, constructed a new field house for its developing athletic programs, and, in 1924, chartered its chapter of Chi Omega.

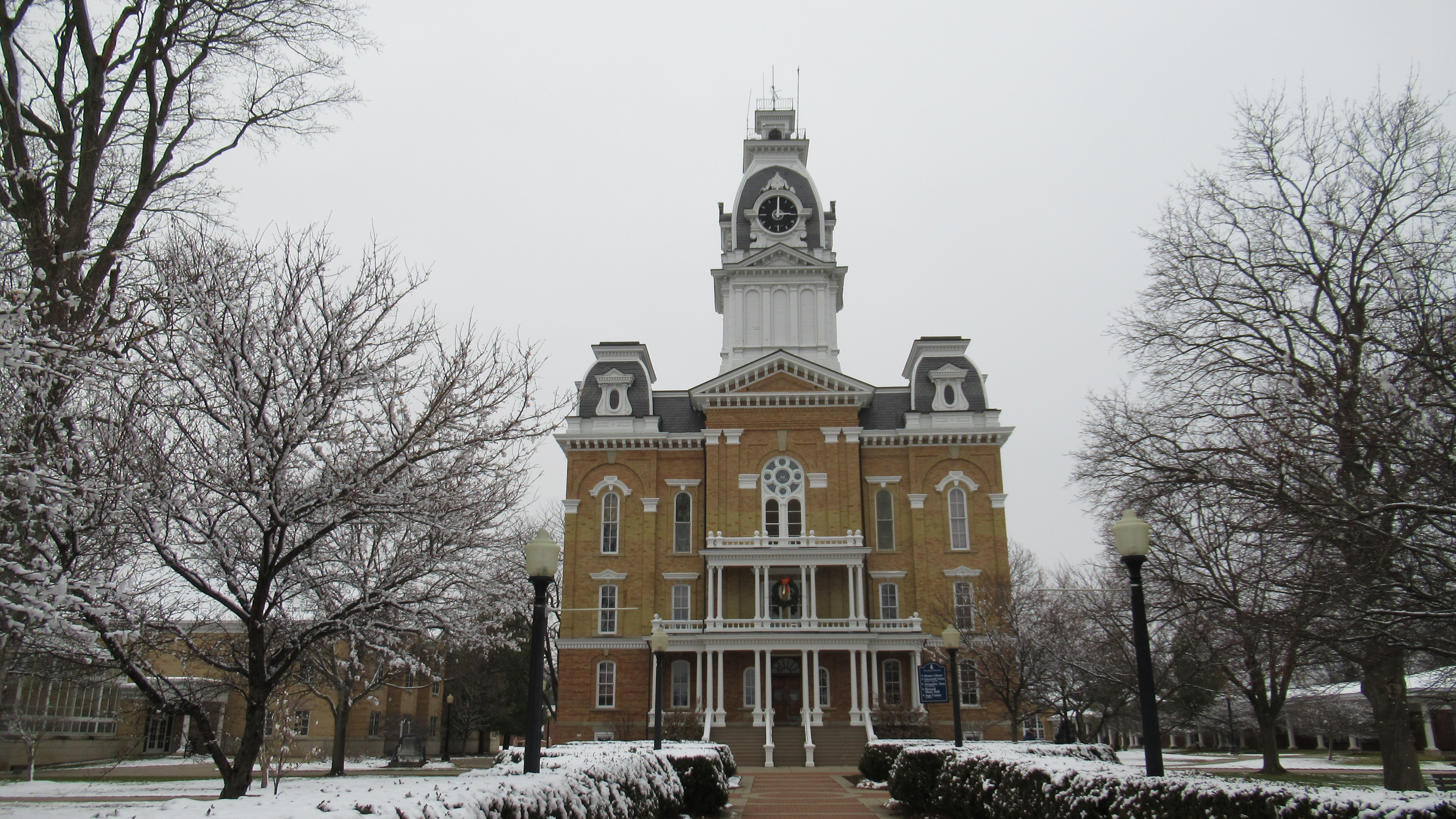
Central Hall was rebuilt after a fire in 1874.

During the Great Depression, Willfred Otto Mauck, Joseph Mauck's son and also an alumnus, was selected as the eighth president, serving from 1933 to 1942. Throughout this era, the college struggled financially, was forced to cancel its new construction projects, and cut the pay of its faculty and staff by nearly 20%. Succeeding Mauck, Harvey L. Turner became Hillsdale's ninth president, serving from 1942 to 1952. Despite its financial difficulties, the college built a new library, had an undefeated and untied football team in 1938, and celebrated its centennial in 1944, when more than 1,000 alumni returned to campus for the commencement ceremony.

J. Donald Phillips next assumed the presidency, holding the position from 1952 to 1971. During his administration, Hillsdale constructed the Simpson and McIntyre Student Residences in 1966.

In these years, Hillsdale began to resist federal civil rights regulations, particularly Title IV of the Civil Rights Act of 1964, concerning affirmative action. In 1962, the college's trustees adopted its own "Declaration of Independence". It affirmed Hillsdale's stance against what it called governmental control.

Hillsdale College
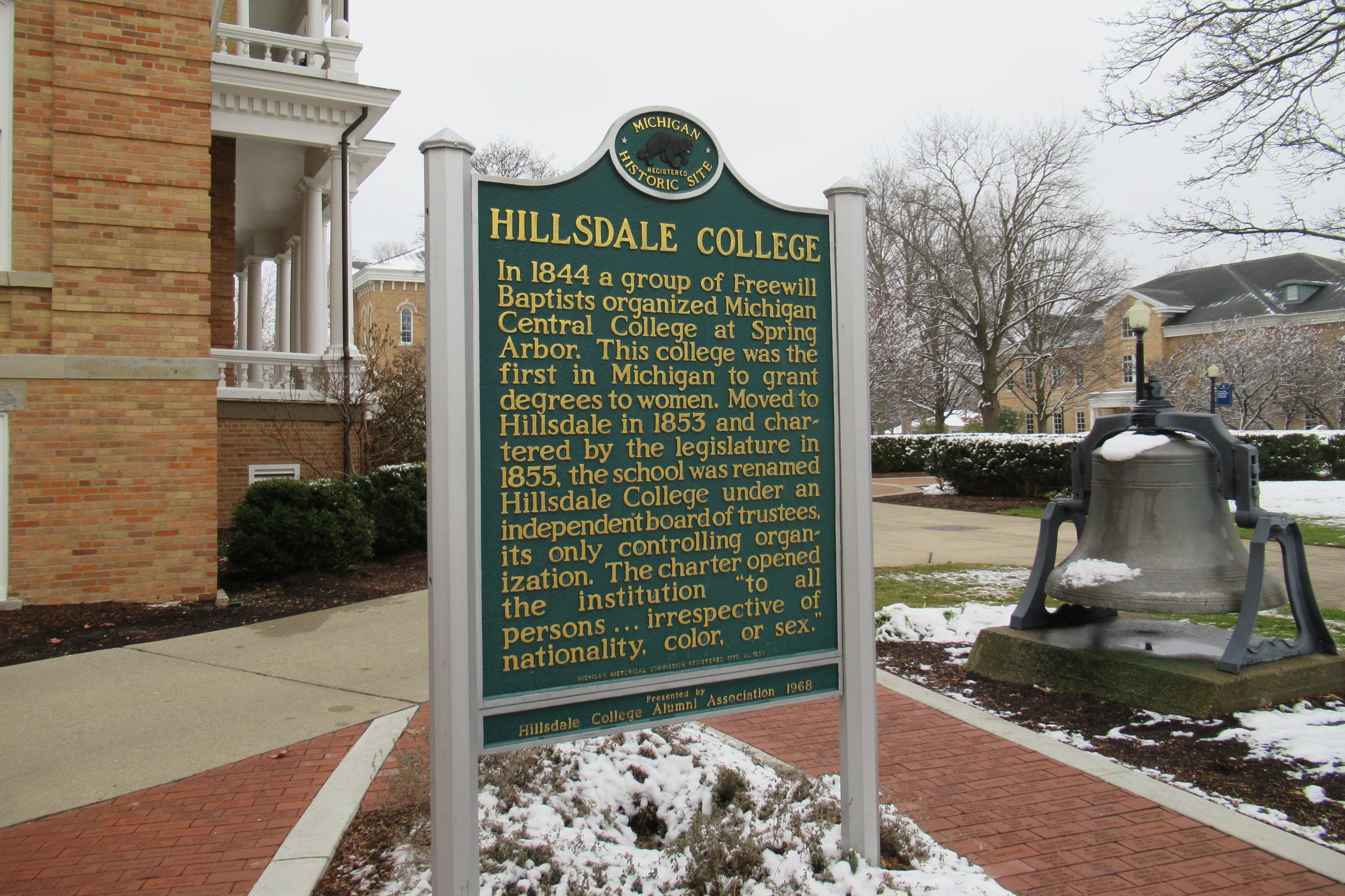
- Interactive map of Hillsdale College
- 41°55′57″N 84°38′02″W
- Location: 33 East College Street; Hillsdale, Michigan

Michigan State Historic Site
- Designated: January 16, 1962

A marker designating the college as a Michigan State Historic Site was erected by the Michigan Historical Commission in 1968.

George Roche III became the 11th president of Hillsdale College in 1971. During the Roche years, Hillsdale became nationally known, in part because of its withdrawal from federal and state-assisted loan programs and grants. Colleges that receive federal funding are required by law to report data on racial integration as part of the US affirmative action student loan program. Hillsdale announced that it refused to do so, and the college's trustees instead stated that the institution would follow its own non-discrimination policy and "with the help of God, resist, by all legal means, any encroachments on its independence."

During Roche's presidency, the college dramatically increased its endowment, established the Center for Constructive Alternatives, and hosted prominent national speakers, including Ronald Reagan. It also began publishing Imprimis, a monthly speech digest.

Russell Kirk taught at Hillsdale for one course per year as a Distinguished Visiting Professor of Humanities.

Roche resigned his position at Hillsdale in late 1999, following a scandal surrounding the suicide of his son's wife. Hours prior to her suicide, she said in front of Roche and other witnesses that the two of them had engaged in an on-and-off 19-year sexual affair. Married to Roche's son, who taught at the school, she had been employed as managing editor of Hillsdale College Press for 14 years. President Roche, who had recently divorced his first wife and married his second, denied the alleged affair, but was suspended by the college on November 1 and resigned his post on November 10th.

=== 21st century ===
Larry P. Arnn has served as president of the college since 2000. Hillsdale's K–12 Initiative developed a full liberal arts K–12 curriculum for use in the charter schools and its private school in Michigan, Hillsdale Academy. In 2021, Hillsdale K–12 released a Civics "1776 Curriculum." In 2022, Hillsdale had schools following its K–12 liberal arts curriculum across 19 states and Barney Charter Schools in 9 states.

After several decades of maintaining a semester program in Washington D.C., Hillsdale established a permanent presence with the establishment of the Allan P. Kirby, Jr. Center for Constitutional Studies and Citizenship on Massachusetts Avenue. The facility was dedicated on Constitution Day 2010. Ginni Thomas, wife of Supreme Court Justice Clarence Thomas, ran the Washington center's speaker series at this time. In 2015, the Boyle Radio Studio at the Kirby Center was dedicated.

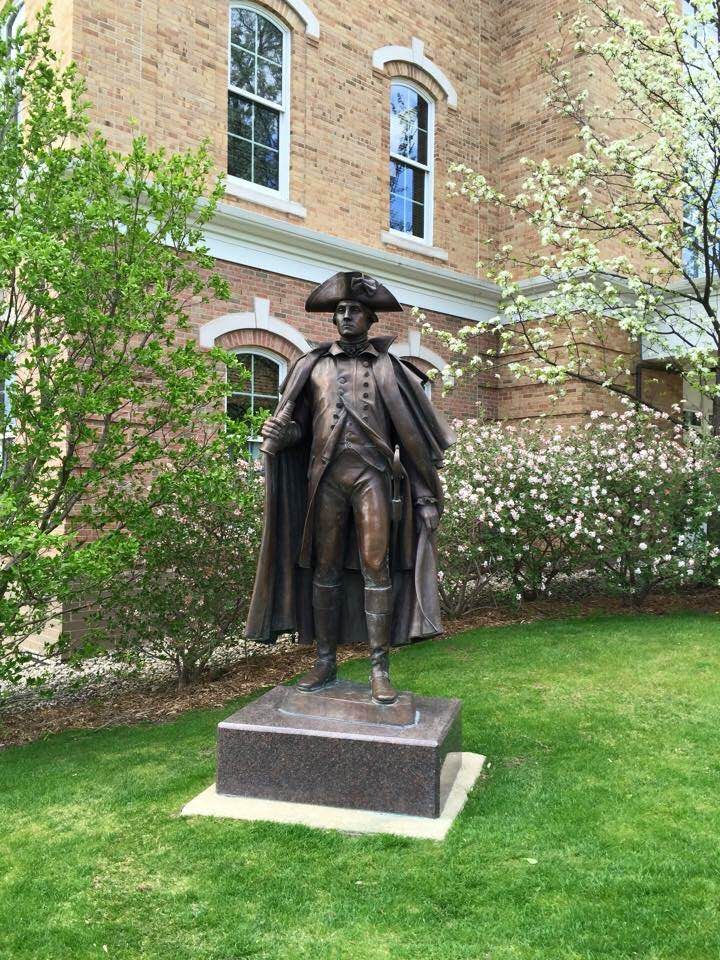
A statue of George Washington on campus

In 2012, Hillsdale founded the Van Andel Graduate School for Statesmanship on its Michigan campus offering both an M.A. and PhD in Politics. Its first M.A. students graduated in 2014, and its first PhD students graduated in 2018. In 2020, Hillsdale founded the Van Andel Graduate School of Government on its DC campus offering an M.A. in government. In 2022, Hillsdale founded its Graduate School of Classical Education offering an M.A. in Classical Education.

In 2013, Arnn was criticized for remarks about ethnic minorities he made while testifying before the Michigan legislature, against the Common Core curriculum standards. Expressing concern about government interference with educational institutions, he noted having received a letter from the state Department of Education early in his presidency that said his college "violated the standards for diversity." He added, "because we didn't have enough dark ones, I guess, is what they meant." After being criticized for calling minorities "dark ones," Arnn explained that he was referring to "dark faces". He stated: "The State of Michigan sent a group of people down to my campus, with clipboards ... to look at the colors of people's faces and write down what they saw. We don't keep records of that information. What were they looking for besides dark ones?" Michigan House Democratic Leader Tim Greimel condemned Arnn's comments, calling them "offensive", "inflammatory and bigoted", and asked for an apology. In response, the college issued a statement apologizing for Arnn's remark, while reiterating his concern about "state-endorsed racism", as Arnn called affirmative action.

In 2019, S. Prestley Blake donated his former home, an exact replica of Thomas Jefferson's Monticello, in Somers, Connecticut to Hillsdale College. In May 2021, Hillsdale dedicated the property as the Blake Center for Faith and Freedom. In November 2021, Hillsdale purchased land in Placer County, California for nearly $6M with plans for a new educational center.

The college has been at the center of a national political and cultural debate about K–12 curriculum.

Hillsdale College is a member of the advisory board of Project 2025, a collection of conservative and right-wing policy proposals from The Heritage Foundation to reshape the United States federal government and consolidate executive power, since Trump won the 2024 presidential election.

Pat Sajak, retired host of Wheel of Fortune, has served as the chairman of the board of trustees since April 2019.

== Academics ==
=== Undergraduate admissions ===
In 2023, Hillsdale College accepted 20.6% of undergraduate applicants. Admitted applicants had an average 3.93 GPA (over 60% had 4.0 GPAs) and, on average, scored 1430 on the SAT or 31 on the ACT.

=== Rankings ===
Academic rankings

Liberal arts
- U.S. News & World Report: 50 of 211

In 2025, Hillsdale was ranked 50th (tied) out of 211 ranked "National Liberal Arts Colleges" by U.S. News & World Report. The Princeton Review's The Best 384 Colleges 2023 ranked Hillsdale as first for "most engaged in community service," seventh for "students love these colleges," eighth for "professors get high marks," and thirteenth for "students study the most."

=== Graduate programs ===
As of 2022, the college offers three graduate programs: the Van Andel Graduate School of Statesmanship, offering both an M.A. and a Ph.D. program in Politics; the Steve and Amy Van Andel Graduate School of Government, based in Washington, D.C., and offering an M.A. in government; and the Graduate School of Classical Education, offering an M.A. in classical education.

== Campus ==
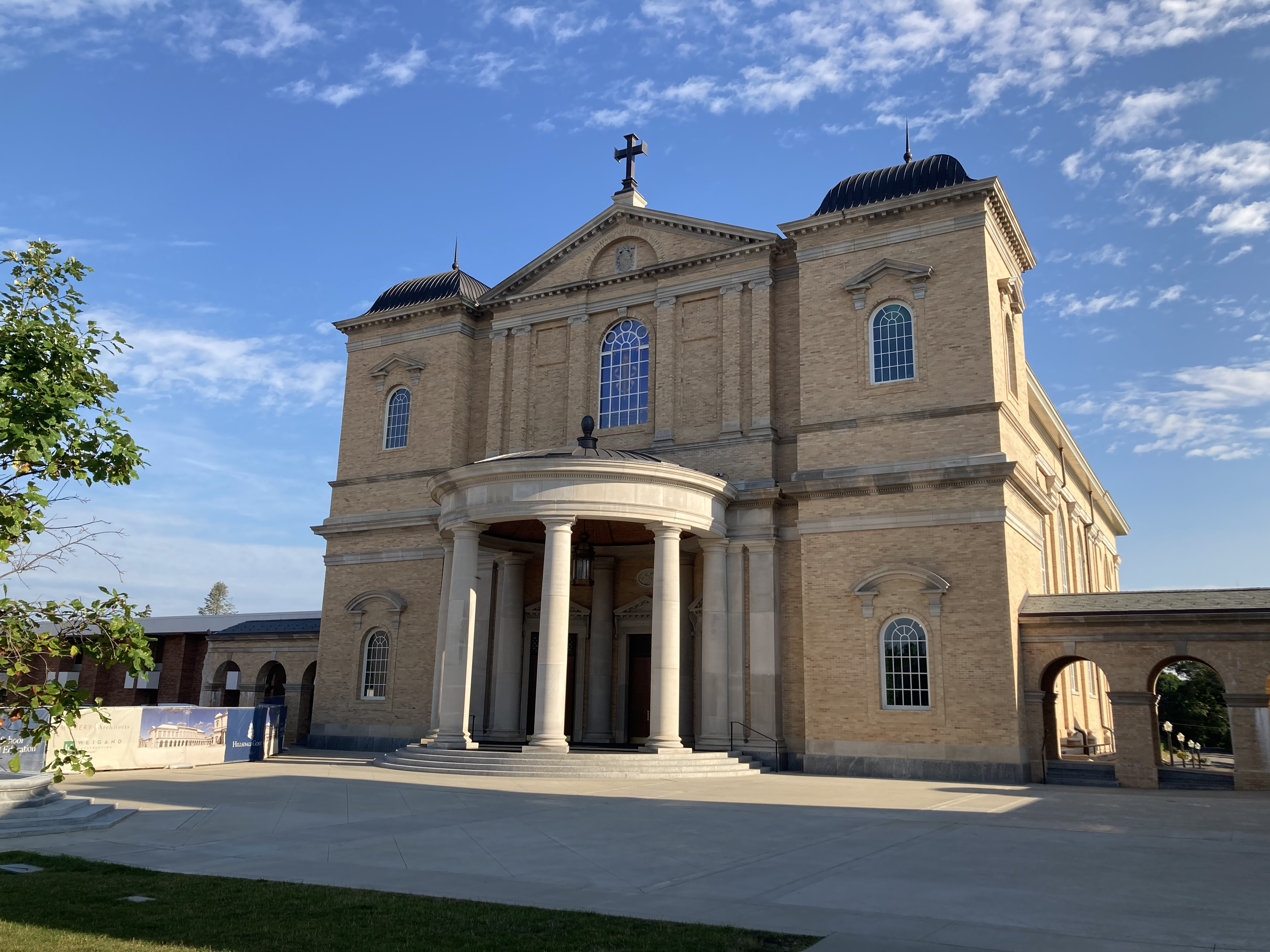
Christ Chapel

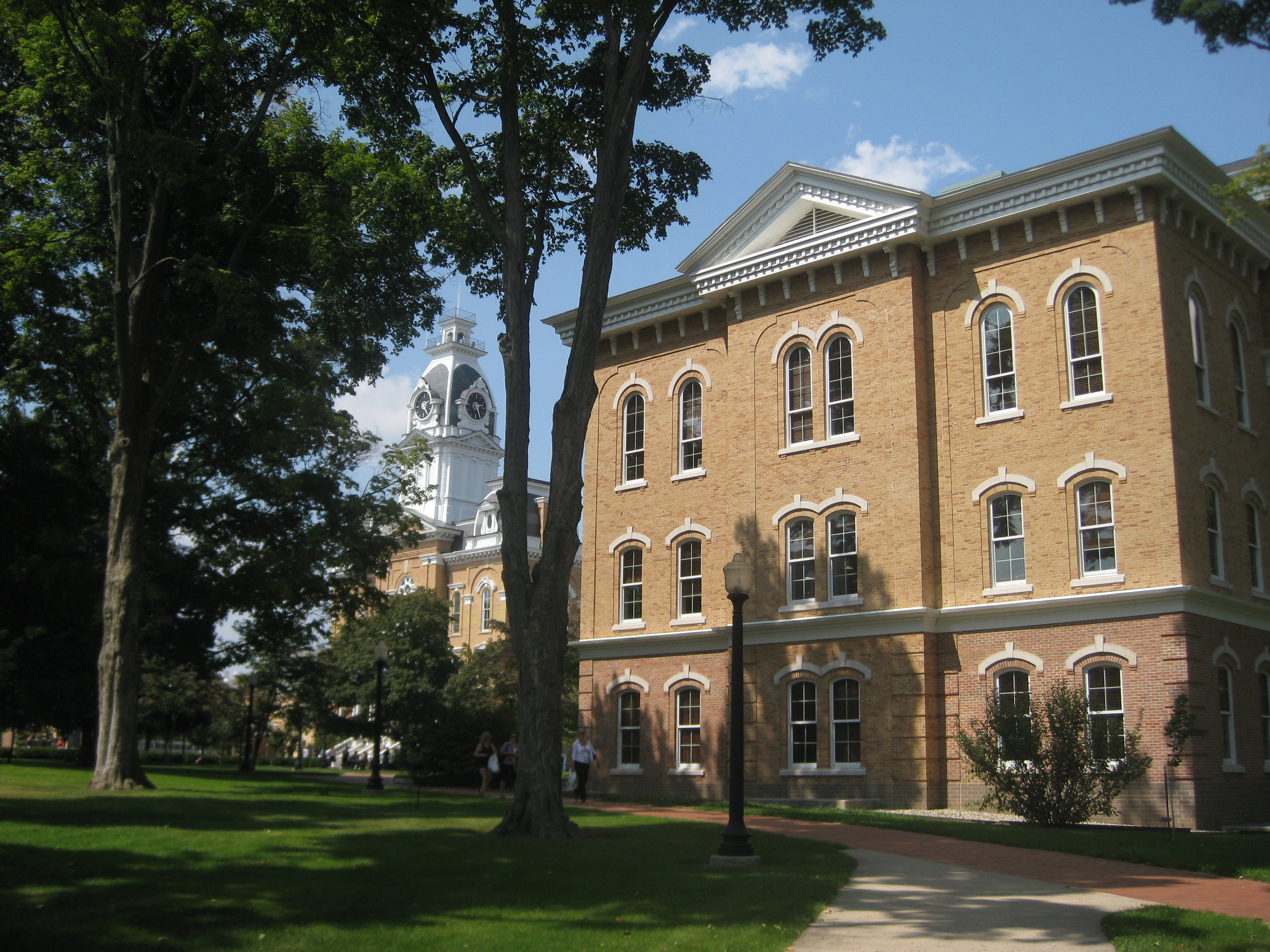
Delp Hall and the Liberty Walk, facing Central Hall

Hillsdale's 200-acre (81 ha) campus contains multiple instructional and office buildings, 13 residence halls, seven fraternity and sorority houses, an athletic complex, a library, a music hall, an arts center, a conference center, a hotel, and a preschool. Hillsdale College also operates Hillsdale Academy, a private K–12 liberal arts school. The college opened the classical-style Christ Chapel in 2019, in a dedication ceremony led by Supreme Court justice Clarence Thomas.

The campus features the Liberty Walk, a walkway lined with bronze depictions of famous politicians including George Washington, Thomas Jefferson, James Madison, Abraham Lincoln, Frederick Douglass, Winston Churchill, Margaret Thatcher, and Ronald Reagan.

== Policies and funding ==
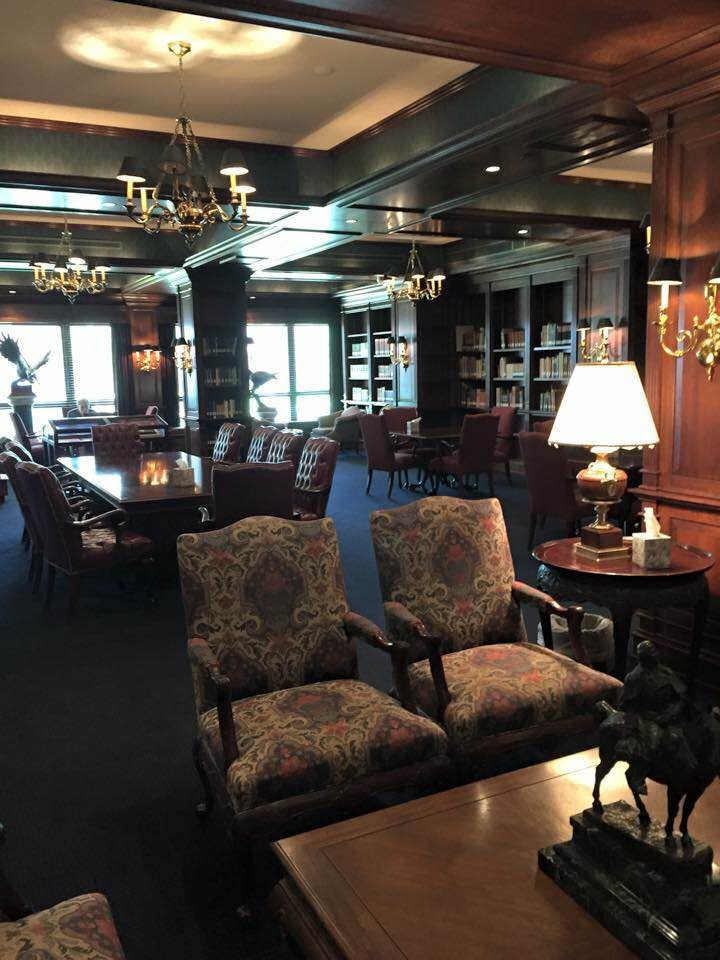
The Richardson Heritage Room, housed in Mossey Library

The school has been described as conservative. In the early 1980s, a controversy over the school's admissions practices threatened federal student loans to 200 Hillsdale students. Title IX prohibits sex-based discrimination in any school or other education program that receives federal money. The federal government required colleges where students received federal funding to document their compliance with Title IX, but Hillsdale refused, arguing that the government could not deny federal funds to its students because the college received no direct federal funding and there was no allegation of actual sex discrimination. When the Department of Health, Education and Welfare (HEW) sought to terminate federal financial assistance to Hillsdale's students in 1978, an Administrative Law Judge denied HEW's request; both HEW and Hillsdale appealed to HEW's Civil Rights Reviewing Authority.

In October 1979, the Reviewing Authority rejected Hillsdale's arguments and the ALJ's decision, ruling that HEW could require Hillsdale to sign the Assurance of Compliance as a condition of its students receiving federal financial assistance. The college appealed to the United States Court of Appeals for the Sixth Circuit; in 1982, the Sixth Circuit ruled that government aid to individual students could be terminated without a finding that a college actually discriminated, but nevertheless upheld Hillsdale's refusal to sign the compliance forms because only its student loan and grant program is subject to Title IX regulation, not the entire college.

In the related 1984 case Grove City College v. Bell, the Supreme Court required every college or university to fulfill federal requirements if its students received federal aid. As a result of this decision, Hillsdale withdrew from all federal assistance beginning with the 1984–85 academic year; Grove City College, the plaintiff in that case, followed Hillsdale's lead four years later. Beginning in the 2007–08 academic year, Hillsdale stopped accepting Michigan state assistance, instead matching with its own aid any funds that a student would have received from the state. Since 2007, Hillsdale's entire operating budget, including scholarships, has come from private funding and endowments. Conservative billionaire Timothy Mellon is among the supporters of Hillsdale College; in 2016, readers who downloaded his autobiography could choose to make donations to the Military Scholarship Fund for veterans attending Hillsdale.

== Programs ==
=== The Blake Center for Faith and Freedom ===
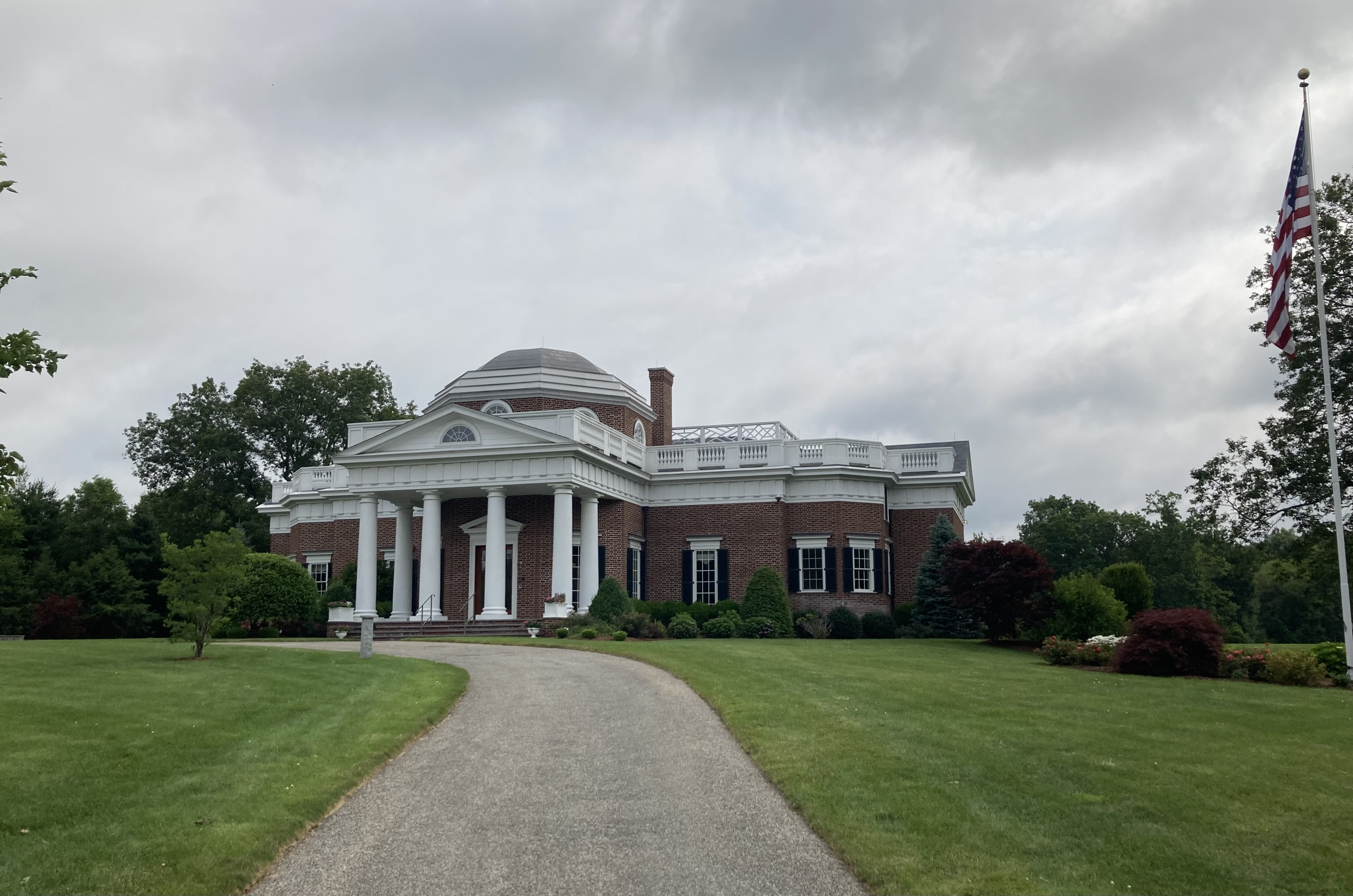
Hillsdale College's Blake Center for Faith and Freedom in Somers, Connecticut. Built in 2014 as a home by Friendly's founder S. Prestley Blake, the replica of Thomas Jefferson's Monticello was donated to Hillsdale in 2019.

In 2019, S. Prestley Blake donated his estate in Somers, Connecticut, to the college. Following a lengthy battle over zoning issues, the college has turned the estate into The Blake Center for Faith and Freedom. The center includes a replica of Thomas Jefferson's Monticello.

=== Academy for Science and Freedom ===
In December 2021, Hillsdale launched the Academy for Science and Freedom in response to the COVID-19 pandemic "to combat the recent and widespread abuses of individual and academic freedom made in the name of science." Hillsdale President Larry P. Arnn said, "What we saw during the COVID-19 pandemic was a silencing of scientific inquiry in favor of policies absolutely hostile to freedom. Liberty is the common good that defines a free society. Policy and science should seek to preserve it whenever possible.”

=== Churchill Project ===
Hillsdale College hosts the Churchill Project, dedicated to the study of Winston Churchill.

=== Barney Charter School Initiative ===
Through the Barney Charter School Initiative, Hillsdale provides curriculum materials, teacher training, and administrative support to a network of charter schools that utilize a classical education model. As of 2024, the network includes over 70 affiliated schools in more than 25 states.

The initiative was established in 2010 with funding from the Barney Family Foundation. The initiative assists local founding groups in establishing charter schools. Hillsdale College does not own or manage these schools directly. Instead, it enters into a formal "Member School" or "Curriculum School" agreement. Under these agreements, Hillsdale provides its K–12 classical curriculum and provides training for teachers and administrators at no cost to the schools, provided they adhere to specific pedagogical requirements.

The Hillsdale classical model focuses on the liberal arts and sciences. The curriculum is structured around a Christian view of Western tradition and uses primary source documents.

In January 2022, Tennessee Governor Bill Lee announced a proposal to partner with Hillsdale College to establish up to 100 charter schools. Following public debate, some local school boards denied applications for these charters. The Florida Department of Education has utilized Hillsdale's civics materials in its teacher professional development programs.

In March 2023, the principal of Tallahassee Classical School, an affiliated school at the time, was requested to resign by the school board following a parental complaint regarding a lesson that included an image of Michelangelo's David. Following the event, Hillsdale College terminated the school's license to use its curriculum and removed its "Member School" status, stating the school's actions did not align with the college's classical education philosophy.

== Campus life ==
=== Athletics ===
In 2018, Hillsdale College was named one of the best schools in the U.S. for student-athletes by Next College Student Athlete's 2018 NCSA Power Rankings. Hillsdale was the fourth ranked school among all NCAA Division II colleges and universities in the U.S. The NCSA Power Rankings, which recognize the best colleges and universities in the U.S. for student-athletes, ranked Hillsdale within the top 10 among all Division II schools for several sports including football, baseball, softball, men's and women's basketball, men's and women's tennis, men's and women's track and field, women's swimming and women's volleyball. Hillsdale men's track and field also ranked 97th overall (among all divisions).

=== Alma mater ===
Hillsdale's alma mater (college song) is "White and Blue". The words and melody were composed by Bess Hagaman Tefft, Class of 1937.

== Notable people ==
=== Alumni ===
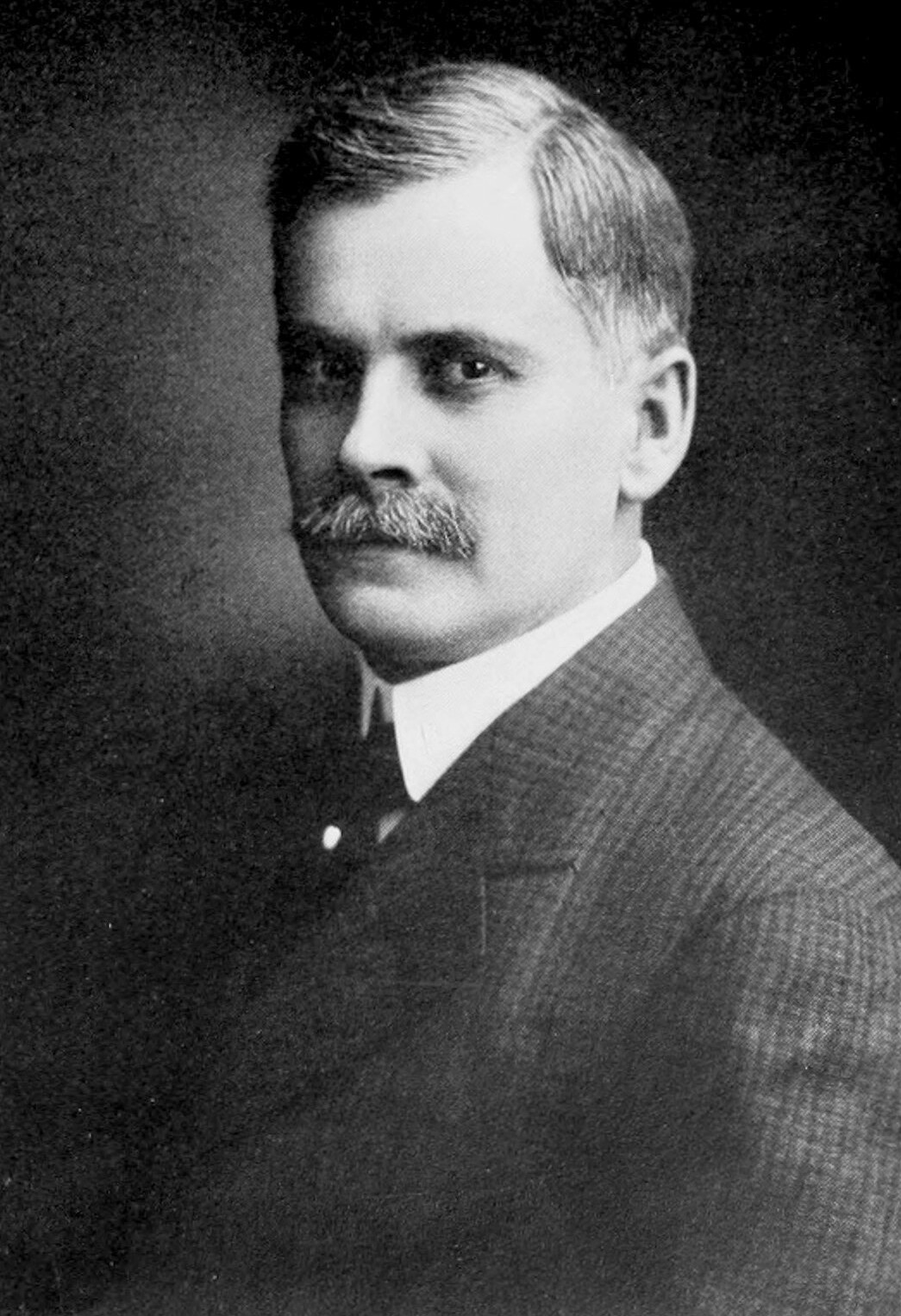
Bion J. Arnold

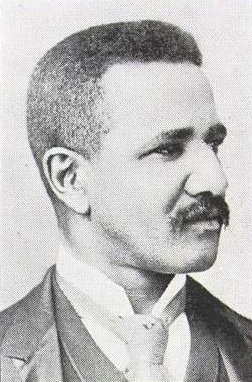
Jared Maurice Arter, former slave, writer, missionary

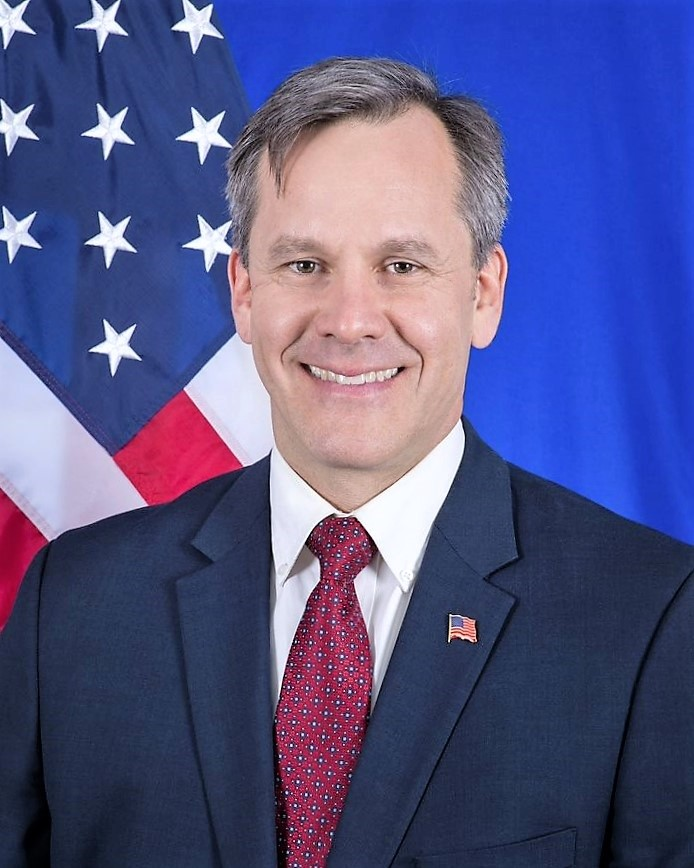
Joseph Cella, former Ambassador to Fiji

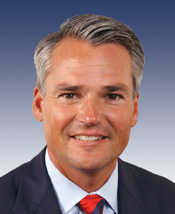
Chris Chocola, former Member of the U.S. House of Representatives

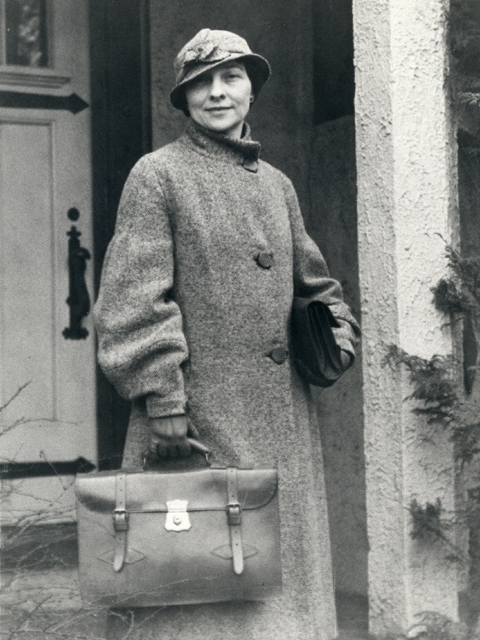
Elizebeth Friedman

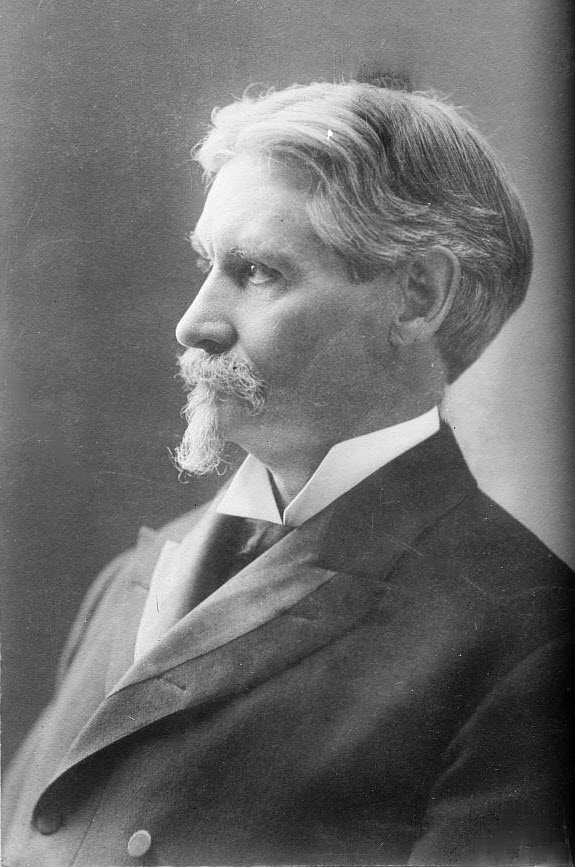
Washington Gardner

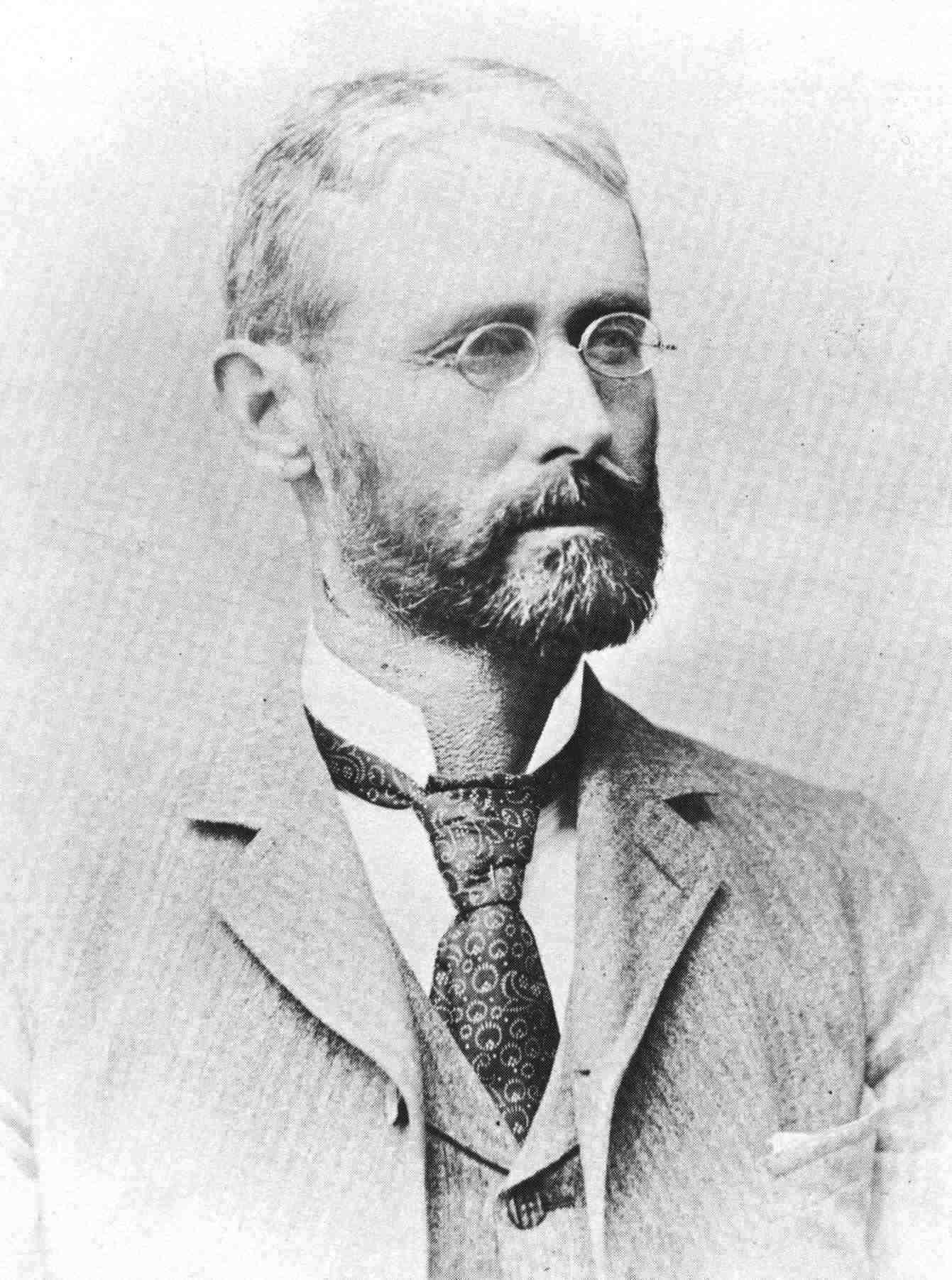
Moses A. Luce

==== Politics and law ====
- E. Ross Adair (1929), member of the U.S. House of Representatives from Indiana
- Chester Hardy Aldrich (1888), Governor of Nebraska and justice on the Nebraska Supreme Court
- Joseph Cella (1991), United States Ambassador to Fiji
- Chris Chocola (1984), member of the U.S. House of Representatives from Indiana's 2nd congressional district and President of the Club for Growth
- Cyrus Cline (1876), member of the U.S. House of Representatives from Indiana
- David L. Cornwell (1964), member of the U.S. House of Representatives from Indiana
- Dan Crane (1958), member of the U.S. House of Representatives from Illinois's 22nd and 19th congressional districts
- Phil Crane (1952), member of the U.S. House of Representatives from Illinois's 8th congressional district
- Robert William Davis (1952), member of the U.S. House of Representatives from Michigan's 11th congressional district
- Solomon Robert Dresser (1865), member of the U.S. House of Representatives from Pennsylvania and founder and president of S.R. Dresser Manufacturing Co., now Dresser Industries
- Spencer O. Fisher (c. 1865), member of the U.S. House of Representatives from Michigan's 10th congressional district
- Albert J. Hopkins (1870), U.S. Senator from Illinois
- Henry M. Kimball (c. 1900), member of the U.S. House of Representatives from Michigan's 3rd congressional district
- Verner Main (1907), member of the Michigan House of Representatives
- Spencer G. Millard (1877), Lieutenant Governor of California
- Joseph B. Moore (1879), justice on the Michigan Supreme Court
- Thomas Morrison (1997), representative for the 54th District in the Illinois General Assembly
- Aric Nesbitt (2001), member of Michigan House of Representatives (2011–2017), 66th district and House Majority Floor Leader; President Pro Tempore of the Michigan State Senate (2019–present)
- Walter H. North (1896), justice on the Michigan Supreme Court
- Jasper Packard (c. 1853), newspaper editor and U.S. Representative from Indiana
- Paul J. Ray, Administrator of the Office of Information and Regulatory Affairs
- Kat Timpf (2010), Fox News contributor
- David Viviano (1994), justice on the Michigan Supreme Court
- Beth Walker (1987), justice of the West Virginia Supreme Court of Appeals
- Betsy Woodruff Swan (2012), reporter
- Hans Zeiger (2007), author and representative for the 25th Legislative District of Washington
- Elliot Gaiser (2012), Assistant United States Attorney General for the Office of Legal Counsel and former Solicitor General of Ohio

==== Military and public service ====
- Clinton B. Fisk (c. 1844), Civil War soldier and statesman, namesake of Fisk University and Prohibition Party candidate for president in 1888; first inductee into the Hillsdale County, Michigan Veteran's Hall of Fame in 2001
- Mary Hannah Fulton (1874), medical missionary in China
- Washington Gardner (1870), Civil War soldier and statesman
- Charles Vernon Gridley (c. 1860), Civil War sailor and Spanish–American War Naval captain
- Moses A. Luce (1866), lawyer and Medal of Honor recipient for service in the Civil War
- Erik Prince (1992), Navy SEAL and founder of Blackwater

==== Science and engineering ====
- Bion J. Arnold, pioneer in electrical engineering and mass transportation

==== Professional sports and athletics ====
- Bud Acton (c. 1964), professional basketball player
- Lynn Bell (1906), professional baseball player and college football coach
- Tom Heckert (1990), professional football manager
- Andre Holmes (2011), professional football player
- Fred Knorr (1937), radio executive and part-owner of the Detroit Tigers
- Chuck Liebrock (1967), professional football player
- Mike Lude (1948), college football coach and athletic director
- Chester Marcol (1972), professional football player
- Spanky McFarland (1976), college baseball coach
- Bruce McLenna (1966), professional football player
- Howard Mudd (1963), professional football player and coach
- Wayne Schurr (1959), professional baseball player
- Ron Tripp (c. 1975), expert in sambo and judo and general secretary of USA Judo
- Jared Veldheer (2010), professional football player
- Isaac TeSlaa (2022), professional football player

==== Academia and scholarship ====
- Manuel Ayau (1973), Guatemalan-born politician, humanitarian, and founder of the "Universidad Francisco Marroquín"
- Clara Kern Bayliss (1871, 1874), first woman to graduate from Hillsdale, became writer, educator
- Elizebeth Friedman (1915), pioneer in cryptology
- Jason E. Hammond, Michigan Superintendent of Public Instruction
- Peter Leeson (2001), economist
- Robert P. Murphy (1998), economist and author
- Sharon Elery Rogers (1951) composer and music educator
- Robert Page Sims (1897), college president, civil rights activist
- Gennady Stolyarov II (2008), libertarian and transhumanist writer

=== Faculty ===
==== Active faculty ====
- Larry P. Arnn, educator and political scientist
- Bradley J. Birzer, history professor and holder of the Russell Amos Kirk Chair in American Studies
- D. G. Hart, religious and social historian
- Mollie Hemingway, journalist
- Wilfred McClay, historian and author
- John J. Miller (journalist), director of the journalism program
- Ronald J. Pestritto, graduate dean and professor of politics
- Paul A. Rahe, historian
- Miles Smith, historian
- Gary L. Wolfram, economist and public policy analyst

==== Former faculty ====
- Michael Anton, former senior national security official in the Trump administration
- Michael Bauman, theologian
- John Jay Butler, Free Will Baptist theologian
- Allan C. Carlson, historian
- Ransom Dunn, dean and professor emeritus
- Clark Durant, educator, Senate candidate, co-founder of Cornerstone Schools (Michigan) and Imprimis
- Richard Ebeling, Austrian School economist
- Burton Folsom, economic historian
- Sir Martin Gilbert, official biographer of Winston Churchill and twentieth-century historian
- Daniel McBride Graham, abolitionist, inventor
- Russell Kirk, conservative writer
- Madsen Pirie, British researcher and former visitor in philosophy and logic
- Frank "Muddy" Waters, College Football Hall of Fame inductee
