= Hiram Wilson =

American abolitionist, Canadian school founder, and minister (1803–1864)

Hiram Wilson (September 25, 1803 – April 16, 1864) was an anti-slavery abolitionist who worked directly with escaped and former slaves in southwestern Ontario. He attempted to improve their living conditions and help them to be integrated into society by providing education and practical working skills. He established ten schools to educate free blacks in southwestern Ontario. Wilson worked extensively with Josiah Henson to establish the British-American Institute and the Dawn Settlement in 1841. He was a delegate to the World Anti-Slavery Convention of 1843 in London, England. He resigned from the British-American Institute and moved to St. Catharines, Ontario, where his home was a final terminal for the Underground Railroad.

== Early life and education ==
Hiram Wilson, the son of Polly McCoy and John Wilson, was born on September 25, 1803, in Acworth, New Hampshire, where he was said to have "inherited the New England dedication to moral uplift."

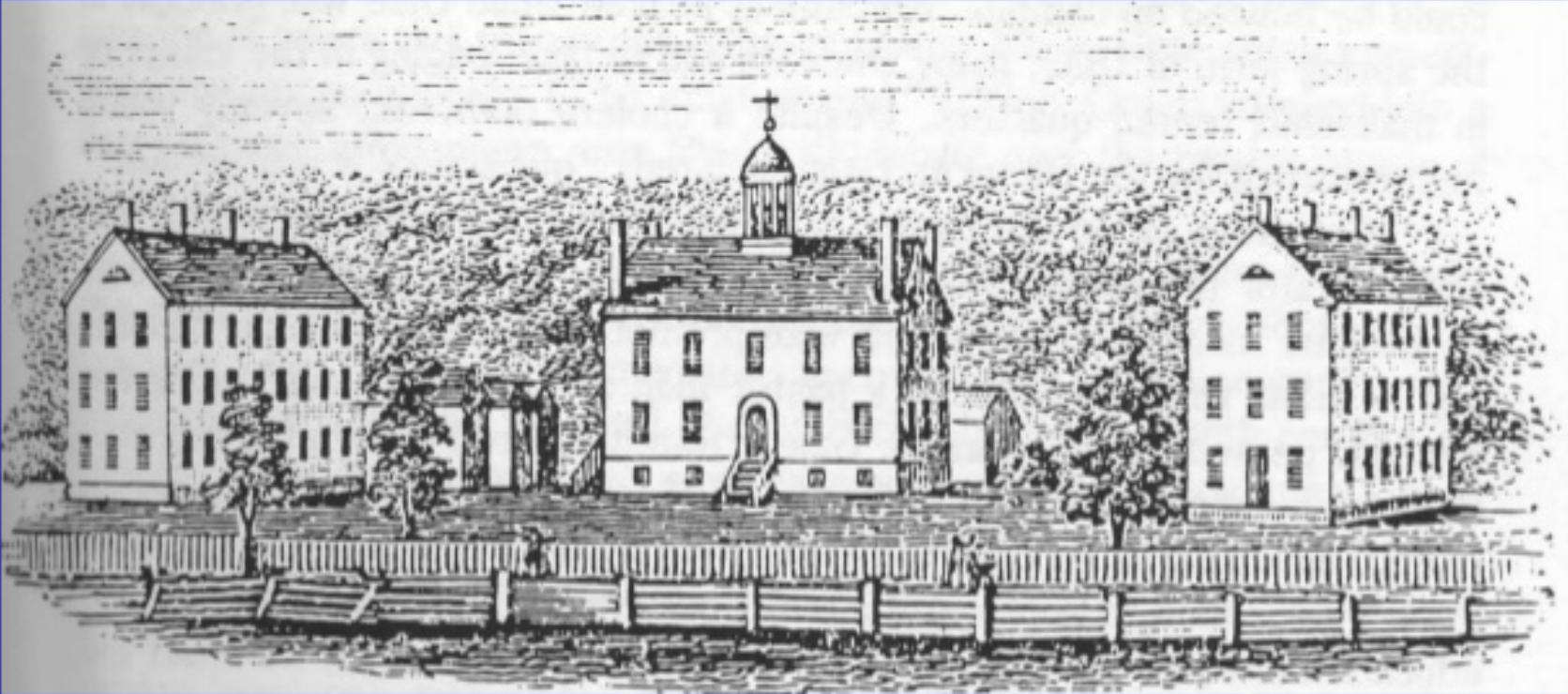
Oneida Institute, Whitesboro, New York

He attended the Oneida Institute in upstate New York, at that time the most abolitionist school in the country. Attending a manual labor college, he worked while gaining an education. In 1833, Wilson was part of the cohort that abandoned Oneida for the new Lane Theological Seminary in Cincinnati. Wilson's stay would not last long, as the slavery debates divided the school and city. He left when the seminary's trustees disbanded the Anti-Slavery Society. Wilson did not participate in this debate but he would join the 72 Lane Rebels who left the school. The rebels demanded the right to discuss controversial topics and the students' rights to freedom of speech. Lane rebel Theodore Dwight Weld responded:

But in solemn earnest, I ask, why should not theological students investigate and discuss the sin of slavery?... Is it not the business of theological seminaries to educate the heart, as well as the head? To mellow the sympathies, and deepen the emotions, as well as to provide the means of knowledge? If not, then give Lucifer a professorship.

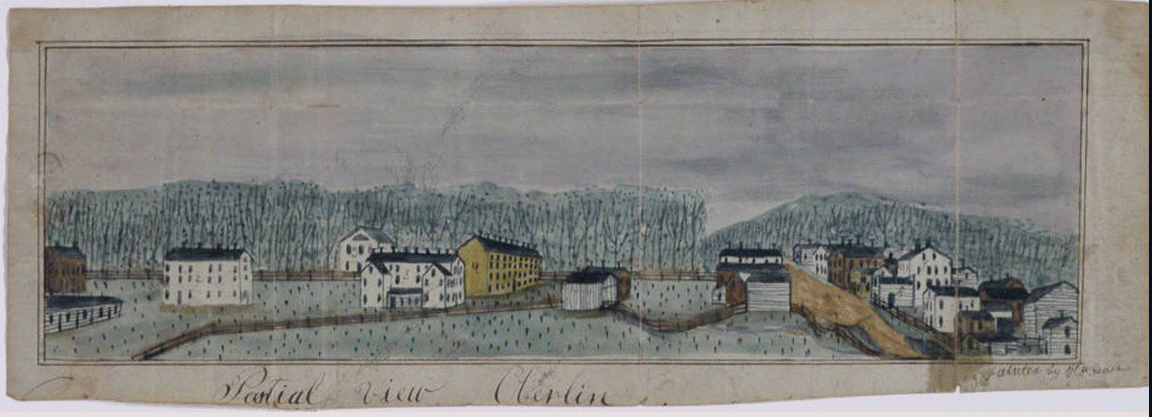
Partial View Oberlin by H. Alonzo Pease, 1838

This group of students left Lane and journeyed to the new Oberlin Collegiate Institute, which replaced the financially troubled Oneida as the most abolitionist college in the country. At Oneida he met William G. Allen, who later taught for Wilson in the summer of 1841. Oberlin was very liberal and soon welcomed both women and negroes. Wilson received a Theology Degree from Oberlin Theological Seminary in 1836. After he graduated, the President of Oberlin, Charles Finney, was interested in the status of freedom seekers who settled in Upper Canada (Ontario) to escape slavery and discrimination. He gave Wilson $25 to travel to Upper Canada and to work with the free blacks.

== Career ==
=== Established schools ===
Wilson discovered that the living conditions in which the free American blacks lived were very poor as they had no education opportunities available to improve their lives. Wilson travelled through the province from the fall through the spring of that year and returned to the United States to act as a delegate of Upper Canada at a meeting of the American Anti-Slavery Society. At this meeting, Wilson explained that the former fugitives faced a tremendous amount of discrimination; he believed education was essential.

Wilson's primary goal for Upper Canada was to establish schools for blacks, but open to anyone desiring an education. He established ten schools by 1839 with fourteen teachers from Oberlin. Gerrit Smith of Rochester, New York provided money, clothing, and Bibles for the schools. Quaker philanthropist James Canning Fuller, from Skaneateles, New York, was also interested in the strides that Wilson had made in Ontario.

=== British-American Institute ===
June 1838, Wilson and Josiah Henson called a convention of Black Canadians to discuss building a school and what should be taught. Henson said, "Our children could gain those elements of knowledge which are usually taught in a grammar-school." Henson thought that, in addition, boys should be taught the practice of a mechanical art, such as millworking, carpentry, or blacksmithing; and girls be instructed in the domestic arts.

The Canada Mission Board gave approval for Wilson and Henson to find a site that would be safe for fugitives. Dawn was the site chosen. Dawn was heavily forested, and its wetlands and grasslands provided game to sustain the community.

Wilson and Henson bought 200 acres of land near the Sydenham River to build the school. On December 12, 1841, Hiram Wilson joined Josiah Henson and James Canning Fuller to establish the British-American Institute, which served as a manual labor college in the Dawn settlement. By 1845, there were seventy students, who were taught by Wilson's first wife, Hannah. By the 1850s, Dawn's population was predominately black. Internal conflicts and financial troubles developed because the Dawn Settlement revolved around the British-American Institute. Dawn filled the needs of the institute, instead of the reverse.

During the first few years of Dawn settlement, the population was almost 500. By the spring of 1847, Wilson's wife Hannah had died; this affected Wilson tremendously. In 1847, the settlement was deep in debt and by the summer of 1848, no one had any credit left except for Wilson. He resigned due to reasons of mismanagement, bad leadership, and the death of James Canning Fuller. There was never enough money to both adequately sustain the settlement, and pull it out of debt, without donations from outside sources.

The idea of a manual labour school seemed to be practical; however, the founders of the institute failed to secure long-term finances and resources. Wilson wrote in 1850 that, "The Manuel Training Institute here ran well for a season, and accomplished much good; but since my resignation [in 1847] ...and the decease of James Cannings Fuller, one of the Trustees, it has run down, and can hardly be resuscitated again without a miracle".

=== World Anti-Slavery Convention of 1843 ===
In 1843, Wilson attended the World Anti-Slavery Convention, in London, where he was the "Central Corresponding Committee for the Coloured Population of Canada." At this convention he gathered with other abolitionists from around the world, and he toured Britain to raise funds. He accumulated $1100.00 and several hundred Bibles and Testaments. He met several people who promised to donate to the Dawn settlement.

=== St. Catharines school ===
Wilson resigned from the Dawn Settlement and moved to St. Catharines, Ontario, where he worked to found a fugitive haven. He opened an American Missionary Association night school with his second wife Mary (his first wife Hannah had died by this time).

Between 1850 and 1856, they took into their house about 125 refugees. Wilson established a Sunday school, which he operated until 1861.

He gave food and clothing and bibles to the literate, to the rest a spelling book. Some 2,000 American blacks in the St. Catharines area arrived between September and December 1850. Another 3,000 arrived from the United States in response to the Fugitive Slave Act of 1850, which established more punitive rules against fugitives and free states.

This school was a terminal station that Harriet Tubman used herself and for her passengers on the Underground Railroad. When Harriet Tubman arrived in St.Catharines in 1851 with eleven freedom seekers, she met Wilson at the AME Church or the Bethel Chapel, the first Black church in St. Catharines.

In 1856, the church's name was changed to the British Methodist Episcopal (BME) Church, otherwise known as Salem Chapel. It became the first National Historical site in St. Catharines.

Benjamin Drew in 1855 wrote about Wilson and his family:

...a distinguished, self-denying philanthropist ... With him the refugee finds a welcome and a home; the port stranger is pointed by him to the means of honorable self-support, and from him receives wise counsel and religious instruction...I have seen the Negro- the fugitive slave, wearied with his thousand miles of traveling by night, without suitable shelter meanwhile for rest by day, who had trodden the roughest and most unfrequented ways, fearing, with too much cause, an enemy in every human being who had crossed his path; I have seen such arrive at Mr. Wilson's...I have seen such waited on by Mr. And Mrs. Wilson, fed and clothed, and cheered, and cared for...."

Throughout Wilson's career, he was always "dogged by misadventure".

== Personal life ==
Wilson was married first to Hannah Maria Hubbard on 17 September 1838. They were married in Troy, New York at the Bethel Free Church. Prior to their marriage, Hannah taught black children in the 1830s in East Troy, New York. The Reverend Daniel A. Payne described her "as a woman of uncommon faith and powerful in prayer, well suited to be the wife of a missionary." Hannah died in the home of Josiah Henson at Dawn settlement. Wilson lived in St. Catharines with his second wife Mary A.H. Wilson and his five children; John J. Wilson (b. 1841), Lydia M. Wilson (b. 1843), Mary E. Wilson (b. 1845), and George S. Wilson (b. 1847). In 1852, he also applied to be the guardian of Alavana Dicken, a former slave.

Wilson died at his home on 16 April 1864 after having had an inflammation of the lungs. He was buried at Woodland Cemetery in Cleveland, Ohio.

== Sources ==
- Pease, Jane H.; Pease, William Henry (1972). Bound with Them in Chains: a Biographical History of the Antislavery Movement. Westport, Connecticut: Greenwood Press. ISBN 978-0-837-16265-2. OCLC 490750485.
- Sernett, Milton C. (1986). Abolition's Axe: Beriah Green, Oneida Institute, and the Black freedom struggle. Syracuse: Syracuse University Press. ISBN 978-0-815-62370-0 – via Internet Archive.
- Silverman, Jason H. (1982). Unwelcome Guests: American fugitive slaves in Canada, 1830–1860 (Phd thesis). University of Kentucky. ProQuest 8207090.
- Stouffer, Allen P. (1992). The Light of Nature and the Law of God: Antislavery in Ontario, 1833–1877. Baton Rouge: Louisiana State University Press. doi:10.1515/9780773563490. ISBN 978-0-807-11791-0. OCLC 25676335.
- Tobin, Jacqueline L.; Jones, Hettie (2007). From Midnight to Dawn: The Last Tracks of the Underground Railroad. New York: Doubleday. ISBN 978-0-385-51431-6. OCLC 69594088.
