= Hinckley (surname) =

Hinckley is a surname. Notable people with the surname include:

- Alonzo A. Hinckley (1870–1936), Apostle of The Church of Jesus Christ of Latter-day Saints
- Barbara Hinckley (died 1995), political scientist and educator
- Bryant S. Hinckley (1867–1961), Latter-day Saint educator
- Edwin S. Hinckley (1868–1929), educator and geologist
- Frederick W. Hinckley (1868–1929), American politician
- George Hinckley (1819–1904), British Royal Navy sailor and Victoria Cross recipient
- Gordon B. Hinckley (1910–2008), fifteenth President of The Church of Jesus Christ of Latter-day Saints
- Ira Hinckley (1828–1904), early Latter-day Saint leader
- Isaac Hinckley (1815–1888), American railroad executive
- Jay R. Hinckley (1840–1914), American politician
- John Hinckley Jr. (born 1955), shot and wounded President Ronald Reagan and three others
- Ken Hinckley (born 1969), American computer scientist
- L. Stewart Hinckley (1902–1969), American politician
- Lyman G. Hinckley (1832–1887), American politician
- May Green Hinckley (1881–1943), Latter-day Saint leader
- Mike Hinckley (born 1982), baseball pitcher
- Richard Hinckley Allen (1838–1908), American astronomer
- Robert Cutler Hinckley (1853–1941), American artist
- Robert H. Hinckley (1891–1988), political scientist and founder of the Hinckley Institute of Politics
- Thomas Hinckley (1618–1706), last governor of the Plymouth Colony
- William Sturgis Hinckley (1806–1846), ninth Alcalde of San Francisco
- Susan Hinckley Bradley (1851–1929), American artist
- Virginia Hinckley Pearce (born 1945), American writer and Latter-day Saint leader

== See also ==
- Hindley (surname)
- Hinkley (surname)
- Hinckley (disambiguation)
