= Hinkley =

Hinkley may refer to:

- Hinkley (surname)
- Hinkley, California, a community in the United States
- Hinkley High School, a high school in Aurora, Colorado
- Hinkley Locomotive Works, a 19th-century steam locomotive manufacturer in Boston, Massachusetts
- Hinkley Point, a nuclear power station in Somerset, England

== See also ==
- Edmund Hinkly, an English cricketer
- Hinckley (disambiguation)
