= Hinckley (disambiguation) =

Hinckley is a town in Leicestershire, England.

Hinckley may also refer to:

- Hinckley (surname)
- Hinckley Yachts, American manufacturer of recreational boats
- Hinckley Vaovasa, New Zealand-born Romanian rugby union football player

== Places ==
In the United States:

- Hinckley, Illinois
- Hinckley, Minnesota
- Hinckley Township, Pine County, Minnesota
- Hinckley, Ohio
- Hinckley Township, Medina County, Ohio
- Hinckley, Utah

In the United Kingdom:

- Hinckley, Leicestershire
- Hinckley and Bosworth, a local government district in Leicestershire
- Hinkley Point, Somerset

== See also ==
- Edmund Hinkly, an English cricketer
- Hinkley (disambiguation)
