= George Washington Gale =

American minister and academic founder (1789–1861)

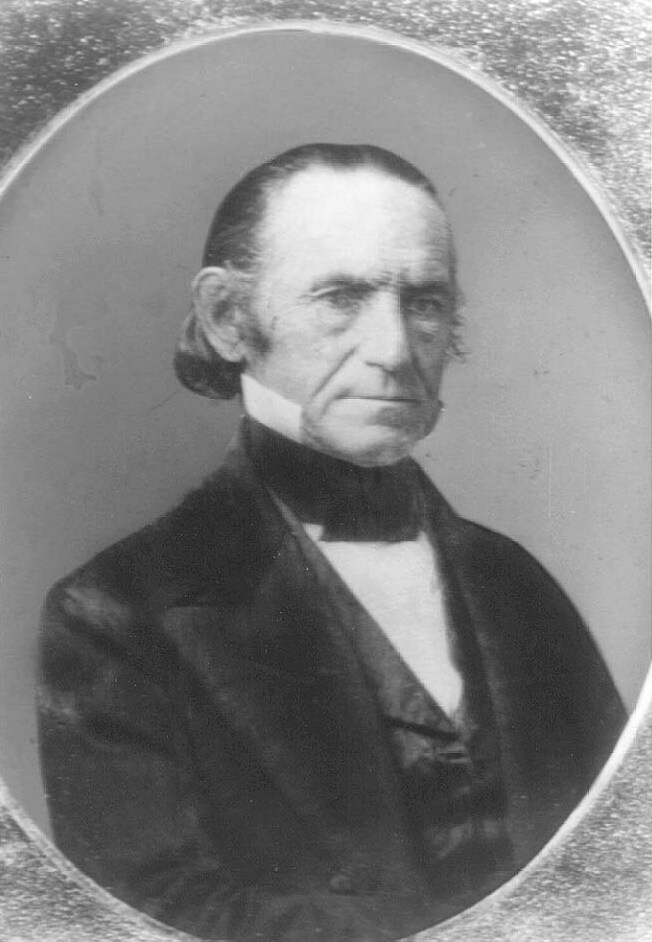
- Born: December 13, 1789; Stanford, New York, U.S.
- Died: September 13, 1861 (aged 71)
- Education: Union College
- Known for: Promoting manual labor colleges; founder of the Oneida Institute and Knox College; mentor of Charles Grandison Finney
- Religion: Presbyterian

George Washington Gale (December 13, 1789 – September 13, 1861) was an American Presbyterian minister who founded the Oneida Institute of Science and Industry. He later purchased land in Illinois that became Galesburg, Illinois, named in his honor, and was instrumental in founding Knox College.

== Early life ==
Gale was born in Stanford, New York, the youngest of nine siblings, and became a Presbyterian minister in Western New York State. At the time, the transportation center of Utica was the intellectual capital of western New York.

A graduate with honors from Union College in 1814, he attended Princeton Theological Seminary, but he withdrew because of poor health (dyspepsia). Although he briefly served at the Female Missionary Society, he received his ordination in the St. Laurence Presbytery. He settled down to preach in the Burned-over district. He was not a gifted speaker. Gale's first assignment was as missionary to settlements on the shore of Lake Ontario, followed by a pastorate in Adams, New York.

== Oneida Institute of Science and Industry ==
In 1824, Gale, again troubled by dyspepsia, resigned his position in Adams, traveled to the southern United States, visiting Georgetown College, Hampden-Sydney College, and Central College, which was later renamed the University of Virginia. He disapproved of Thomas Jefferson's decision to remove religion from the university's operation.

Gale bought a farm in Western, New York, and started an experiment "teaching some young men who proposed to prepare themselves to preach the Gospel", the seven young men paying him through their labor. This successful experiment would be the start in the United States of the manual labor college. Among the students there was Charles Finney, a lawyer who, through Gale's efforts, found a new faith in Christ and undertook to become a Christian minister.

In 1827, Gale founded the Oneida Institute of Science and Industry in Whitesboro, New York, an institution with a strong religious component, incorporating manual labor as a means by which students could pay for their education and simultaneously receive the spiritual (psychological) and physical benefits of exercise. Most of the Western students followed him there.

Although the details are not known,) Gale was not effective as the Institute's leader; he described his own status as "straitened". He was "too indifferent to money to handle it carefully or account for it consistently." He asked to be replaced in 1831, and his replacement, Beriah Green, "for whom Gale had nothing but scorn", took over in 1833, finding that Gale had left the school with significant indebtedness. The philanthropist brothers and benefactors of Oneida Lewis and Arthur Tappan sought a new manual labor school to support, hiring in 1832 one of Gale's students, Theodore Weld, to find a suitable location. Weld recommended the new Lane Theological Seminary, in Cincinnati. In a highly public incident Gale never refers to, a group of about 24 students, led by Weld, moved there from Oneida, complaining mysteriously about "the lack of theological classes". Finding Lane unhospitable to their abolitionism, they left en masse for the new Oberlin. Both Lane and Oberlin were barely functioning before the arrival of the Oneida contingent.

== Knox College ==
From 1833 to 1834, while in Whitesboro, the unemployed Gale drew up the plans and recruited supporters for yet another manual labor college, further west. A scouting party found fertile, well-situated land available in central Illinois. He issued a circular setting forth his plan and soliciting subscribers from the Utica–Troy Mohawk River region of upstate New York. A subscribers' committee led by George Washington Gale purchased 17 acres in Knox County in 1835. The first settlers, including Riley Root, arrived in 1836.

John C. Smith, of Oneida County, New York, one of the subscribers to Gale's labor college, owned a number of boats used on the Erie canal. He suggested that such a boat could be used to make the 1,000 mile trip by water. A number of individuals formed company and bought a canal boat on shares. It was equipped for passenger service and provisioned for the journey. Thirty-seven men, women and children, ranging in age from a babe of three weeks to men and women of forty or fifty years, boarded the boat. Smith was captain and his wife was the cook and housekeeper. When it became obvious it was too much for her, Clarissa Root Phelps and the wife of Colonel Isaac Mills assisted.

Prayer meetings were held daily. The boat traversed the Erie Canal, and at Buffalo, New York, the passengers, goods, and live stock were transferred to a lake steamboat bound for Cleveland. The canal boat was towed behind until a fierce storm off Ashtabula, Ohio forced the steamboat captain to cut the tow lines to the canal boat. He landed the passengers at Cleveland. Some of the goods were damaged by the rain until the canal boat was recovered. They then journeyed down the Ohio and Erie Canal to Cincinnati. After a stay there, they travelled south on the Ohio towards Louisville, where the Louisville and Portland Canal around the rapids had recently been completed. At St. Louis they refused an offer of $1000 for their boat, which they refused although they regretted it later on. Several members of the party took sick. The Mississippi was low and the mosquitoes left many sick with malaria. They dispatched one rider to contact the first group of settlers, who returned with a rescue party with teams, blankets, and supplies to help the invalids. Captain Smith died at Knoxville and Isaac Mills dies soon after. The town was subsequently named Galesburg, Illinois in his honor.

In 1837 the Knox Manual Labor College (later Knox College, site of one of the famous Lincoln-Douglas debates of 1858). Gale became a professor of rhetoric and moral philosophy at Knox.

Gale died on September 13, 1861.
