= Beriah Green =

American abolitionist (1795–1874)

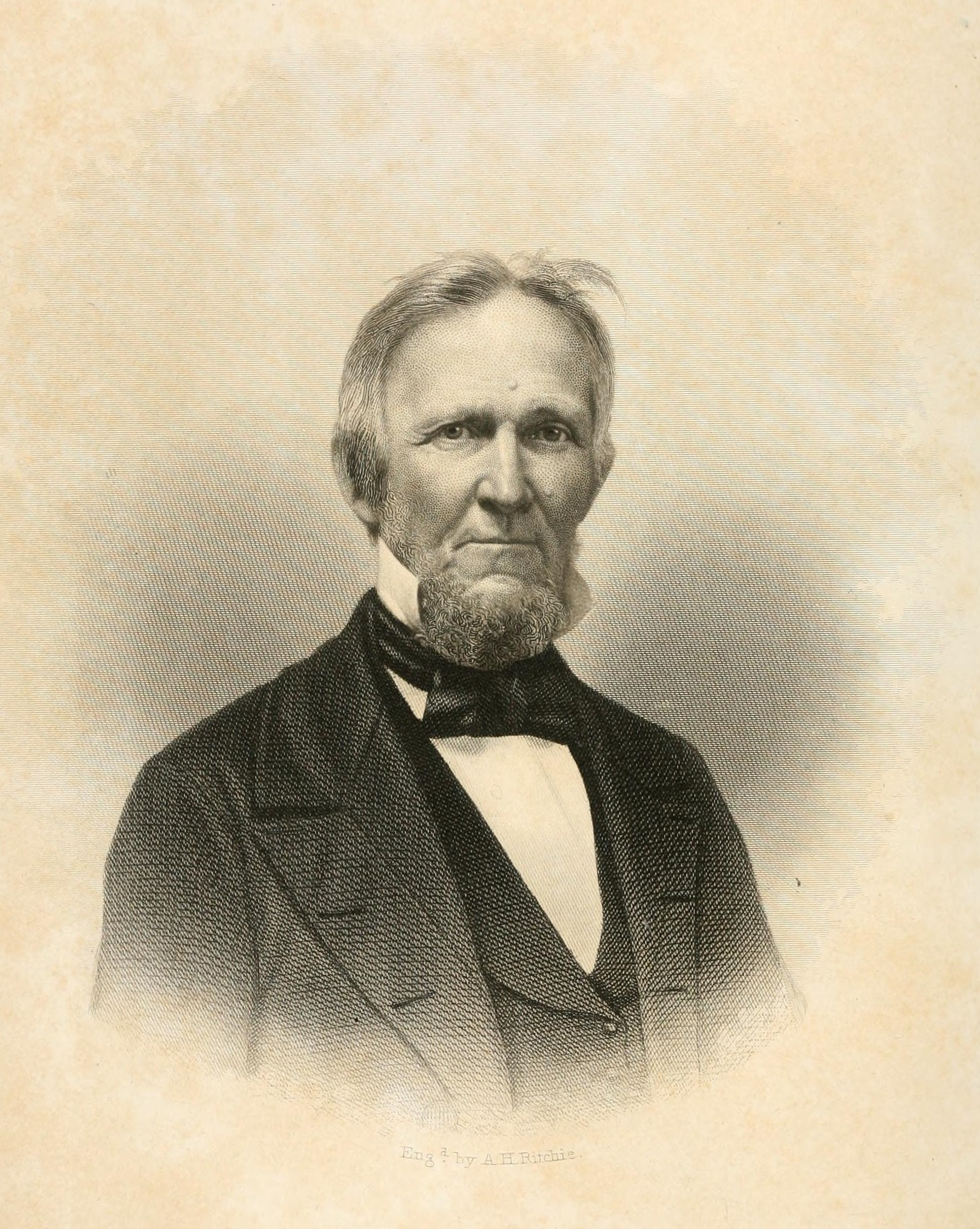
Engraving by Alexander Hay Ritchie (1860)

Beriah Green Jr. (March 24, 1795 – May 4, 1874) was an American reformer, abolitionist, temperance advocate, college professor, minister, and head of the Oneida Institute. He has been described as "consumed totally by his abolitionist views".

== Early life ==
Greene was born in Preston, Connecticut, eldest of six children born to Beriah Green (1774–1865) and Elizabeth Smith (1771–1840). His father was a cabinet and chair maker. Jonathan Smith Green was his younger brother.

The family moved to Pawlet, Vermont, in 1810, and he may have attended the Pawlet Academy. In 1815 he enrolled in the Kimball Union Academy, in New Hampshire. He graduated from Middlebury College in 1819, where he was valedictorian, and then studied to become a missionary (minister) at Andover Theological Seminary (1819–20). However, his religious beliefs did not agree with any denominational creed.

== Career ==
Because of financial need, he began teaching at Phillips Academy, also in Andover, Massachusetts, in 1820. Suffering from health and vision problems, he left the seminary. After recovering, in January 1821 he married Marcia Deming of Middlebury, Vermont, and was briefly in the service of the Missionary Board in Lyme, Connecticut, and on Long Island. Having been ordained, in 1823 he became pastor of the Congregational Church in Brandon, Vermont. In 1826 his wife died, leaving him with two children, and the same year he married Daraxa Foote, also of Middlebury, who outlived Beriah. In 1829 he accepted a call to the distinctly "orthodox" (conservative) church of Kennebunk, Maine, but the next year left, to occupy a new position, Professor of Sacred Literature (Bible), and college chaplain, in the one-man theological department of Western Reserve College and Preparatory School, in Hudson, Ohio, 30 miles (48 km) from Cleveland. His salary was $600 per year (equivalent to $18,141 in 2025).

The buildings of this "Yale of the West" — Green calls it that — imitated those of Yale College. It had the same motto, "Lux et Veritas" (Light and Truth), the same entrance standards, and almost the same curriculum.

=== The topic of slavery ===
In the Cleveland area (the "Connecticut Western Reserve") Beriah came in contact with more African Americans than he had in Vermont or Maine. The college first admitted an African-American student in 1832, John Sykes Fayette; he graduated in 1836. Three other African-American students — Richard W. Miller, Samuel Nelson, and Samuel Harrison — were also admitted during this time period. Fugitive slaves traveling to Canada on the Underground Railroad passed through northeast Ohio: John Brown, of the 1859 raid on Harpers Ferry, grew up in Hudson (1805–1825), running a tannery, then moved to a more isolated and safer (for fugitive slaves) site in northwest Pennsylvania, a major Underground Railroad stop. That the two met is possible but undocumented; there is no known correspondence between them. What is documented is his contact with Wm. Lloyd Garrison, who through his weekly newspaper The Liberator, launched in 1831, led the fight for immediate, uncompensated liberation of all slaves. Green wrote that "One copy of Mr. Garrison's 'Thoughts' has reached us [Thoughts on African Colonization, 1832] and we take a few copies of his admirable paper." Garrison was a great influence on Green; one way was to encourage Green to publish his sermons and other writings, which gave him influence.

Sending free blacks to Africa ("colonization") was the mission of the American Colonization Society (ACS), founded by Quakers, and supported by state colonization societies and Southern slave owners. Free blacks were against it; they did not want to move to Africa, having lived for generations in the United States. They said they were no more African than the white Americans were British.

The debate started by Garrison's newspapers and book led to a heated campus debate. "Trustees, faculty, and students began to choose sides." College president Charles Backus Storrs, who had recommended Green, a contemporary of his at Andover Theological Seminary, had been a supporter of colonization as a solution to "the negro problem". But he too read The Liberator, and he said that Garrison's views could not be refuted. His inaugural address, in February 1831, invoked the abolitionism of William Wilberforce.

The influential Theodore Weld made a visit to Western Reserve in the fall of 1832. "Less than two months after Weld departed, Green was preaching abolitionism from the college pulpit." Green used the college chapel four Sundays in a row to attack the American Colonization Society and its supporters. This angered many trustees and clergymen.

=== The four sermons on slavery ===
Green's four sermons on slavery, delivered in November and December 1832, constitute a turning point of national significance.

One of the duties, or honors, of his job was delivering the weekly sermon from the pulpit of the college chapel:

The occupancy of the pulpit of the Western Reserve College is, by the laws of that institution, entrusted to the theological professors. As standing for the present alone in that department of instruction, the responsibility of preaching in the College chapel, it is generally known, devolves upon me.

As fellow professor Elizur Wright wrote, Green was "pastor of our college church".

In his sermons, Green took the position, unusual in his day, that negroes were the equals of whites, and the victims of irrational prejudice based on no more than the color of their skin. These sermons created "a rumpus" on the campus. Some people walked out of the first sermon, and they and more refused to hear the following sermons.

Green, who frequently published pamphlets, had the four sermons published. In the pamphlet was a brief message from College President Storrs and Elizur Wright, another professor, certifying that the published texts were the same as those delivered in the College chapel, and that "the sentiments embodied on these discourses, we believe to be scriptural. The exhibition of them in the college-chapel...we believe to have been not only warranted, but imperiously demanded, by a just regard to pastoral fidelity."

They were influential nationally, contributing to the foundation, the following year, of the American Anti-Slavery Society. Green presided over its founding meeting, and was chosen as its first President.

=== The Oneida Institute ===
Expecting to be fired, Green resigned in 1833 and became the President of the Oneida Institute, a Presbyterian institution in Whitesboro, New York. Green accepted the presidency at Oneida on two conditions: that he be allowed to preach immediatism (the immediate abolition of slavery), and that he be allowed to accept African-American students.

As President, Green dramatically changed the college by accepting numerous African Americans, more than any other college during the 1830s and 1840s. Green did not believe that it was right to have separate schools for blacks and whites. This belief led him to attempt to get Gerrit Smith to merge his unsuccessful black manual labor school in Peterboro with the Oneida Institute, and it made Oneida a hotspot for abolitionist activity. Many future black leaders and abolitionists were students at Oneida while Green was president. These include William Forten, Alexander Crummell, Rev. Henry Highland Garnet, William G. Allen, Jermain Wesley Loguen, and Rev. Amos Noë Freeman.

In 1832, Green began to correspond with Gerrit Smith on the issue of black education. The two men became very close friends and much of what is known about Green is known from their letters. The two men worked together toward the goal of abolition. They continued correspondence until 1872, when they stopped writing because of long-held disagreements about civil government and political abolition.

Green was chosen as president of the organizational meeting of the American Anti-Slavery Society, formed in 1833 in Philadelphia. He was famous for refuting the arguments of men who used the Bible to defend slavery. In the late 1830s, Green focused most of his time contesting these arguments.

Green engaged in a series of public debates in Utica with Joseph H. Danforth of the American Colonization Society, about whether free Blacks should emigrate to Africa. The debates were followed by "riotous proceedings," and Green was hung in effigy.

In 1835, Green and his friend Alvan Stewart convinced Gerrit Smith to come to an organizational meeting for a New York Anti-Slavery Society, which they had called, in Utica. An anti-abolitionist mob, including Congressman Samuel Beardsley and other "principal citizens", "reviled the participants" and forced the convention to adjourn. At Smith's invitation they continued their meeting in his home, in nearby Peterboro, New York.

== Decline and closure of the Oneida Institute ==
The Panic of 1837 hit the Oneida Institute hard — its benefactors the Tappan brothers were ruined and unable to fulfill their pledges — and the college began to decline. Green also had begun to lose favor with conservative Presbyterians, which added to Oneida's troubles. Green led the secession of 59 church members from the Presbyterian church in Whitesboro because "the Oneida Presbytery was guilty of the crime of slave holding." The seceders formed the Congregational Church in Whitesboro in 1837. Green was pastor of that church from 1843 to 1867.

In 1844, the Oneida Institute closed, and the campus was sold to the Free Will Baptists. Green then became an active supporter of the Liberty Party. This was a third party that was completely devoted to the abolition of slavery, and nominated Smith for the office of President. After the party failed to make an impact on American politics, Green became bitter with the democratic process. He did not like popular democracy and was in favor of an oligarchy or modified theocracy. Unlike many Liberty Party members, Green did not join the Free Soil Party. He was worried that abolition would not be part of the major party principles.

After fellow abolitionists did not support his ideas about government, Green became resentful and did not travel far from Whitesboro. He supported his wife and children by farming and preaching to small groups of abolitionists.

He died on May 4, 1874, while giving a speech on temperance in Whitesboro.

== Judgments about Green ==
His student William E. Allen said Green "is a profound scholar, an original thinker, and, better and greater than all these, a sincere and devoted Christian. To the strength and vigor of a man, he adds the gentleness and tenderness of a woman." Former student Alexander Crummell described him as a "bluff, kind-hearted man," a "master-thinker".

Charles Stuart, another contemporary, seeking to raise funds for the Institute: "The labors of President Green in the antislavery cause, in the way of lectures, and the use of the press, have been various, indefatigable, abundant, in the face of evils and proscriptions of various kinds, and eminently successful. He has all alone shone himself a man for emergencies. On such occasions, whoever else may have done it, Beriah Green has never been known to flee or flinch. The result is that the Institute has always been in the midst of a hard struggle — in establishing and sustaining itself as a manual labor college, second in defense of its course of study, and last, not least, in its [abolitionist] vindication and defense of the rights of humanity.

According to Muriel Block's MA thesis Beriah Green, the Reformer, "He was so firmly convinced of his opinions and so uncompromising that he aroused hostility all about him." Modern scholars have also described Green as "cantankerous", "obdurate," "caustic, belligerent, [and] suspicious". According to Milton Sernett, author of Abolition's Axe: Beriah Green, Oneida Institute, and the Black Freedom Struggle, the only book on Green, "Green's erratic personality, acerbic tongue, and lack of political acumen were just as responsible for the closing of the institute as were problems with conservative trustees and the withdrawal of financial support from several key funding sources."

In her review of Sernett's book, Linda Perkins states: "Although known during his lifetime as a 'fanatic' by many, Green has been more aptly described as a 'radical humanitarian'. Indeed, his life was a testimony to his beliefs. In the final analysis, he forfeited wealth, reputation, friends, and ultimately respectability for 'the cause'."

== Legacy ==
In 2016 Green was inducted into the National Abolition Hall of Fame, Peterboro, New York.

== Writings ==
- Books
  - According to Appletons' Cyclopædia of American Biography, Green published in Albany, 1823, a History of the Quakers. No other information has been found about this book.
  - Green, Beriah (1841). The miscellaneous writings of Beriah Green. Whitesboro, New York: Oneida Institute.
  - Green, Beriah (1861). Sermons and other discourses. With brief biographical hints (2nd ed.). New-York.
- Pamphlets and articles
  - Green, Beriah (1826). A sermon, preached in Poultney, June 29, 1826, at the first annual meeting of the Rutland County Foreign Missionary Society [on Proverbs 11:25, "A generous person will prosper"]. Castleton, Vermont: Rutland County Foreign Missionary Society. OCLC 506144174.
  - Green, Beriah (1826). An oration, pronounced at Middlebury, before the associated alumni of the college, on the evening of commencement, August 16th, 1826. Castleton, Vermont.
  - Green, Beriah (1827). A sermon, preached at Brandon, Vt. Oct. 3, 1827, at the ordination of the Rev. Messrs. Jonathan S. Green & Ephraim W. Clark, as missionaries to the Sandwich Islands. Middlebury, Vermont. OCLC 81987273.
  - Green, Beriah (February 1829). "The long forbearance of God toward sinners". National Preacher. 3 (9): 129–135.
  - Green, Beriah (February 1829). "Evangelical truths offensive to the unrenewed but joyous to the believer". National Preacher. 3 (9): 135–144.
  - Green, Beriah (1833). Four sermons preached in the chapel of the Western Reserve College : on Lord's Days, November 18th and 25th, and December 2nd and 9th, 1832. Cleveland.
  - Green, Beriah (July 1834). A Voice from the Oneida Institute. OCLC 177679576.
  - Green, Beriah (October 1835). "A Review — The Principles of Reform". Quarterly Anti-Slavery Magazine. 1 (1): 34–67.
  - Green, Beriah (1836). Things for northern men to do: a discourse delivered Lord's day evening, July 17, 1836, in the Presbyterian church, Whitesboro, N. Y. New York.
  - Green, Beriah (1836). The church carried along, or, The opinions of a doctor of divinity on America slavery. New York.
  - Green, Beriah (July 1836). "Letter to a minister of the Gospel". Quarterly Anti-Slavery Magazine. 1 (4): 333–340.
  - Green, Beriah (1838). The martyr : a discourse, in commemoration of the martyrdom of the Rev. Elijah P. Lovejoy, delivered in Broadway Tabernacle, New York, and in the Bleecker Street Church, Utica. New York: American Anti-Slavery Society.
  - Green, Beriah (1839). The chattel principle the abhorrence of Jesus Christ and the apostles; or, No refuge for American slavery in the New Testament. New York: American Anti-Slavery Society.
  - Green, Beriah (1842). The divine significance of work. Valedictory address, delivered at the anniversary of the Oneida Institute. Whitesboro, New York: Oneida Institute. OCLC 2774356.
  - Green, Beriah (1844). Sketches of the life and writings of James Gillespie Birney. Utica, New York: Jackson & Chaplin.
  - Green, Beriah (1846). Work and wages : a sermon preached in Whitesboro, N.Y., November, 1846.
  - Green, Beriah (1848). "Speech of Beriah Green (written out by himself)". Proceedings of the National Liberty Convention, held at Buffalo, N.Y., June 14th & 15th, 1848 : including the resolutions and addresses adopted by that body, and speeches of Beriah Green and Gerrit Smith on that occasion. pp. 33–45.
  - Green, Beriah (1858). Sermon at the funeral of Henry D. Ward, July 24, 1858. Rome, New York: R. R. Meredith.
  - Green, Beriah (n.d.). Duty to the heathen.
- Published letters
  - Letter to Theodore Weld, October 1832
  - Letter to Simeon Jocelyn, November 5, 1832

== See also ==
- Oneida Institute

== Further reading (most recent first) ==
- Sernett, Milton C. (Fall 1986). "Common Cause: The Antislavery Alliance of Gerrit Smith and Beriah Green". Syracuse University Library Associates Courier. Vol. 21, no. 2.
- Block, Muriel L. (1935). Beriah Green, the Reformer. M.A. thesis, Syracuse University.
