= William G. Allen =

African-American lecturer & academic

William Gustavus Allen
- Born: c. 1820; Urbanna, Virginia, US
- Died: May 1, 1888 (aged 67–68); London, England
- Occupations: Professor, lecturer
- Known for: First Black man to marry white woman in U.S.
- Spouse: Mary King
- Children: 7

Academic background
- Education: Oneida Institute

Academic work
- Discipline: Languages, rhetoric
- Institutions: New-York Central College
- Main interests: Abolitionism; African civilization

William Gustavus Allen (c. 1820 – 1 May 1888) was an African-American academic, intellectual, and lecturer. For a time he co-edited The National Watchman, an abolitionist newspaper. While studying law in Boston he lectured widely on abolition, equality, and integration. He was then appointed a professor of rhetoric and Greek at New-York Central College, the second African-American college professor in the United States. (The first was his predecessor at Central College, Charles L. Reason.) He saw himself as an academic and intellectual.

Frederick Douglass described him as "a gentleman, a scholar, and a Christian. He is an ornament to society."

Meeting and falling in love with a white student, Mary King, the couple married in secret in 1853. This was one of the first legal marriages between a "colored" man and a Caucasian woman to take place in the United States. They immediately left the country, never to return, because of the violent prejudice against their relationship. While for a time he continued to lecture in both England and Ireland, and wrote an autobiographical account including his marriage, which sold well, he and his family eventually fell into obscurity and near-poverty.

== Biography ==
=== Early life ===
Allen was born free around 1820 in Urbana, Virginia, to a free mixed-race mother and a Welsh American father, both of whom died early in Allen's life. As he himself noted, he was a quadroon: his ancestry was 75% white and 25% black. He was light skinned, and he rejected the label of "negro"; nevertheless, under Virginia law he was black ("colored"). Allen was adopted by a free black couple who owned "a flourishing business" at Fort Monroe, Virginia.

Allen was raised by his birth parents in Norfolk, where he attended a school for African-American children for two years. The school was closed down due as part of the reaction to Nat Turner's slave rebellion of 1831. There was no school for colored children in Fort Monroe, but he received some informal education from Federal soldiers, including some French and German. He had access to libraries and was to some degree self-educated, but took advantage of the few educational opportunities available to a black boy. A teacher recommended him to Gerrit Smith, a wealthy abolitionist and philanthropist, whose help, along with that of Lewis Tappan, made it possible for Allen to attend the Oneida Institute. Oneida was the first college in the country that accepted African Americans as a matter of policy; it was a hotbed of abolitionism.

=== College and career ===
At Oneida, like most college students at the time, William received what in the 20th century would be called ministerial training: Hebrew, Biblical Greek, theology, and philosophy, with small amounts of science, algebra, and public speaking (declamation). During the summer of 1841 he "taught in a school for fugitive slaves in Canada" (see Hiram Wilson).

Allen had fond memories of Oneida, from which he graduated in 1844. He settled in Troy, New York, where he was active in a black suffrage organization. Together with Henry Highland Garnet, also an Oneida alumnus, he edited and published the abolitionist newspaper National Watchman, in which "the selections and editorials show that he [Allen] is a man of sense, education, and good temper". No surviving copies of the newspaper are known. When it ceased publication in 1847, Allen moved to Boston, studying under and working as a clerk for the abolitionist lawyer Ellis Gray Loring.

In Boston, Allen became well known as a lecturer (see below).

In 1850 Allen, who had begun to enjoy fame as a lecturer (see below), was appointed professor of Greek and Rhetoric at New-York Central College (NYCC) in McGraw, New York. (In 1853 he described himself as professor of "the Greek and German languages, and of Rhetoric and Belles-lettres".) Since his predecessor Charles L. Reason had departed earlier in 1852, he was in 1852 and 1853 "the only acting colored Professor in any college in the United States", in Frederick Douglass' words.

Allen voted (for Franklin Pierce) in the 1852 United States presidential election, since poll workers thought he was white.

=== Marriage to Mary King ===
Before the Civil War, sexual union between white male and black female, usually forced, was common. (See Children of the plantation, Sally Hemings, and Lydia Hamilton Smith.) Sexual contact between black male and white female existed but was much less common; in slave states it was considered to always be rape—the white woman could never have consented—and resulted in the black man's immediate execution. While less serious relations were tolerated in some parts, and Massachusetts (only) had repealed its ban on interracial marriage in 1843, actual marriage between black and white was so unusual it was reported in the newspaper. (African Americans were not U.S. citizens and were generally believed to be genetically inferior to whites.) Zephaniah Kingsley, married outside the U.S. to an African woman he had purchased as a slave in Cuba, had to leave Florida after it became a U.S. territory in 1821. It was not until Frederick Douglass's marriage to Helen Pitts in 1884 that a married white–black couple could live openly in Washington, D.C., without violence, although they received much vituperation.

While visiting Fulton, New York, for a series of lectures in the spring of 1851, Allen spent an evening at the home of the abolitionist Reverend Lyndon King, who Allen called one of "earth's noble spirits". Here Allen met King's daughter Mary, who was beginning a term at New-York Central College. They quickly formed a relationship, which Allen described as "much more significant than that of teacher and pupil." In January 1853 the two became engaged. Her father "at once gave his consent", and her sister "warmly approved". Her brothers, of whom there were many, and Mary's stepmother were bitterly opposed. Rev. King felt himself obliged to bar Allen from the household, but he still drove Mary to meet Allen's arrival by train.

One supportive couple, the Porters, who had also been students at Central College, lived in nearby Phillipsville. While Allen and Mary were visiting, a mob of 600 formed around the Porters' house, seeking to lynch him. A group within the mob, hoping to calm the anger, negotiated with Allen, King, and the Porters. King was escorted to her parents' house. Allen, after being escorted to the village hotel, was able with difficulty to escape for Syracuse, where he stayed at the Globe Hotel for around a week; Mary took several days to elude her parents, and secretly met with Allen at a trusted friend's house.

Mary traveled to Pennsylvania, telling her parents she intended to teach school there, and wrote letters to Allen stating she intended to join him. By arrangement, they married in New York City on March 30, 1853, and immediately left for Boston, where they sailed to Liverpool, England, never to return. The episode was reported in many newspapers, along with derogatory remarks on the pair, especially Allen.

Porter lost his teaching job; "the schoolmaster got his walking papers on Monday, for harboring the 'nigger'." He lost his next job "when it was discovered that he was 'the Phillipsville School-Master'". Central College hired him.

According to a resolution passed in February, 1853, at a state convention of the Liberty Party in Syracuse, New York, "the recent outrage upon that accomplished and worthy man, Prof. Wm. G. Allen, and the general acquiescence, not to say general rejoicing, in this outrage, are among the fearful evidences that, on the subject of Slavery, the deeply corrupted heart of the American people is past cure."

=== Exile in England and Ireland ===
Allen found in England an "absence of prejudice against color. Here the colored man feels himself among friends, and not among enemies". He and his wife were "happy" there. They attended the great anti-slavery meeting in Exeter Hall, at which Harriet Beecher Stowe and her husband Calvin Stowe spoke. A clipping of 1854 shows him lecturing to an anti-slavery meeting in Manchester, with other lectures in the vicinity on "'The origin, past history, and literature of the African race' which proved not to be true as racism later came to plague Allen's professional life as a teacher. 'The probable destiny of the African race', &c. &c." A letter from Lord Shaftesbury said he "sympathises most heartily with Professor Allen, and sincerely wishes him success in his undertaking. It will give Lord Shaftesbury great pleasure to assist in any way that he can a gentleman of the coloured race, who is a hundred times wiser, and better, than his white oppressors."

They traveled across the United Kingdom, moving to Dublin in 1856, where they had four children. In 1860, they moved back to England. He attempted to make a living through his lectures, but the couple was often close to poverty. In 1863, Allen became director of the New Caledonian Trading School in Islington, a school for the poor, the first African-American to direct an English school. However, in five years, finances and the "racism of his competitors" forced him out. Mary started a small school for girls, which failed. In 1871 they were living in Islington with six children; William's profession is listed as Professor of Music. By 1878, they were living in a boarding house in West London, where they survived largely on the charity of friends, especially Gerrit Smith.

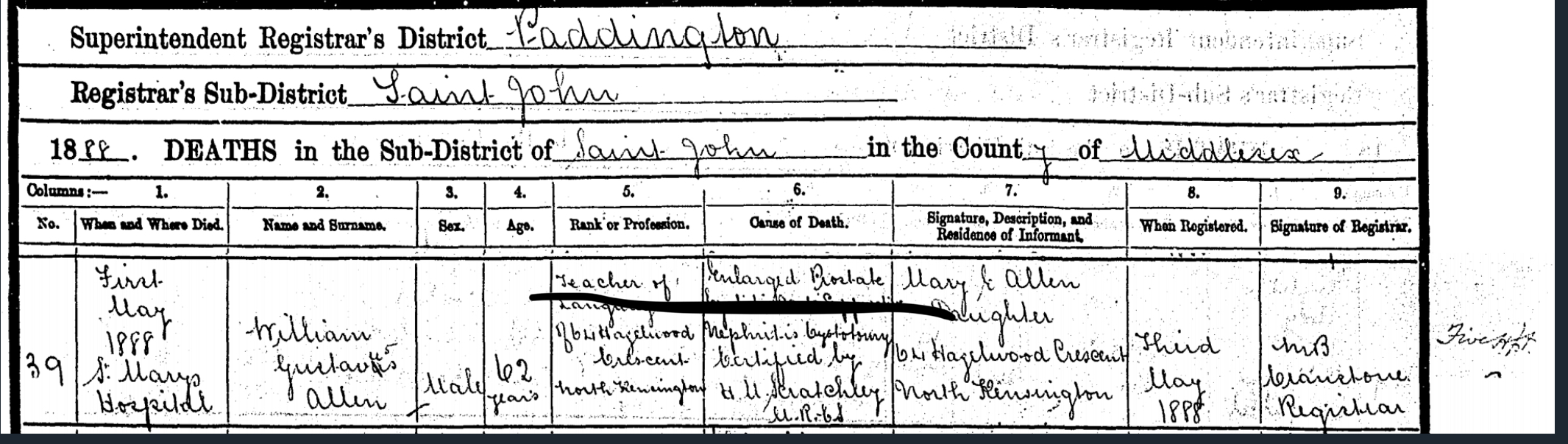
William G. Allen death certificate

William died at St Mary's Hospital, London on May 1, 1888. His death certificate gives his occupation as teacher of languages, and lists nephritis and enlarged prostate as the causes of death.

The relationship between Allen and Mary King was the basis of Louisa May Alcott's 1863 story M.L.

== Allen's thought ==
Allen was arguably the most learned African American of his day. He was well read, including Greek and Latin classics. He was capable of comparing Demosthenes and Cicero at length, as he does in "Orators and oratory". Allen taught Greek, at a time when knowledge of classical Greek was the pinnacle of a humanistic education. He also taught German, the leading scholarly language at the time, and he read French. As put by Wm. Lloyd Garrison, discussing his lectures, Allen had a "cultivated mind", as well as "true refinement of manners".

=== Allen as lecturer ===
Allen's primary vehicle for presenting his views was lectures. Numerous newspaper articles concur that he was an eloquent speaker. He excelled as a lecturer, at a time when lectures were much more important than today (2020). "The lecture was one which would have done honor to the mind of the historian Bancroft, while the gentle and modest demeanor of the speaker, together with the gracefulness of his elocution and ready command of language, gave to the performance an additional interest," said the Essex County Freeman. The Syracuse Daily Standard called him "a colored gentleman, of brilliant talents, and education", and said that his lecture "was one of the best ever delivered in this city". In sum,

As a speaker, Mr. Allen is far more than ordinary. His style is easy, and his gestures graceful.—He is not noisy—does not talk as though lie wished to out-thunder Niagara; it seems like anylhing but hard work for him to talk, and sure I am, that it is easy to listen.

That an African American was capable of such learning and eloquency filled his listeners with pleasant surprise (but no hostility). "One individual who had never been known to express any favorable feeling for the colored man and his cause, on leaving the lecture room the other evening confessed that the impression made on him by the subject as presented had given him new and exalted opinions of the class hitherto deemed so inferior."

When based in Boston (1847–1850), at New-York Central College (1850–1853), and in England and Ireland (1853–), nearly the whole of which he visited, he was a frequent speaker, making small trips to the venues where he was to speak. Allen did not publish his lectures—they may not have been written out—and only one, "Orators and Oratory", is preserved completely, having been published in Frederick Douglass' Paper. However, from newspaper reports and his pamphlets, key points in his lectures can be identified.

=== Allen's pamphlets ===
Allen evidently preferred to speak, to be in front of a group, than to write, by definition a solitary occupation. Printing, using hand-set type, human-powered presses, and rag paper, was relatively expensive. There was not much of a book industry in the antebellum United States. Lecturing was actually a cost-effective way to transmit ideas, reaching groups rather than individual readers. Lecturing had a hidden benefit for Allen, that of letting society see that an African American could be well educated and well spoken. His appointment as professor at Central College is due in part to his lectures.

All of Allen's pamphlets were self-published and intended to be sold at his lectures to earn whatever he could by that route, besides being sent out to potential lecture venues. In chronological order, they are:

- The African race : an essay for the times (Boston, 1848). Of this pamphlet of 20 pages only two copies are known. It states that it the "article is from the Christian Examiner."
- Wheatley, Banneker and Horton. With selections from the poetical works of Wheatley and Horton, and the letter of Washington to Wheatley, and of Jefferson to Banneker (Boston, 1849). Reprinted in 1970 by Books for Libraries Press, ISBN 0836986571. Studies Phyllis Wheatley, Benjamin Banneker, and George Moses Horton, adding that "we regard Horton as decidedly the superior genius" (p. 7). In addition to the poems and the letters from Washington and Jefferson, he includes "sketches" of the authors "written by white persons distinguished for character and standing" (p. 7).
  - "Introduction", by Allen (pp. 3–7).
  - "Phillis Wheatley", a slightly abbreviated and edited version of the text found in the Boston, 1837 edition of Wheatley's poetry (pp. 9–20)
  - Letter of George Washington (p. 20)
  - Poems of Phillis Wheatley (pp. 21–27)
  - "Benjamin Banneker", by John H. B. Latrobe (pp. 28–31), a slightly abbreviated version of a paper read before the Maryland Historical Society
  - Letter of Banneker to Thomas Jefferson (pp. 31–34)
  - Reply of Jefferson to Banneker (p. 35)
  - More by Latrobe? (pp. 35–38)
  - Brief introduction to Horton by Allen (p. 39)
  - "Explanation", taken from first publication of Horton's poetry (pp. 39–41)
  - Poems of Horton (pp. 42–48)
- Allen, William G., "a refugee from American despotism" (1853). The American Prejudice Against Color: An Authentic Narrative, Showing How Easily the Nation Got into an Uproar. London.
- Horton, George Moses; Plácido (Gabriel de la Concepción Valdés) [in Spanish] (1856). Allen, [William G.] (ed.). The African poets, Horton and Placido: with an introduction by Professor Allen. Dublin. Archived from the original on September 27, 2023.
- Allen, William G. (1860). A Short Personal Narrative. Dublin. (sold by the author)

== Allen's topics ==
=== The African race ===
Allen's favorite subject was what he called "the African race". There are more reports of his lectures on this topic than on all other topics combined. He did not use the same title twice, and they ranged from "The Mental Powers and Abilities of the Colored Man" (1849, Boston) "History, literature, and destiny of the colored race" (1849, Rochester, New York), "Origen, literature and destiny of the African race" (a series of lectures, 1850, Saxonville, Massachusetts), to "The Origin, History, Characteristics, Condition, and Probable Destiny of the African Race" (1857, Liverpool, England).

=== Origin of the African race ===
Allen "seemed indeed to be perfectly familiar with every branch of the human family, as far back as the days of Noah, and to possess an intimate acquaintance with all the writings extant of every historian, both ancient and modern." This knowledge led him to the position, avant-garde in his day, that all "races" have a common ancestor. "The human family sprung from one common progenitor; ...climate and habits are sufficient to produce all the difference in the condition of the races inhabiting the different portions of the globe."

In an 1850 lecture, Allen, "with one stroke of his logic, ...let the wind out of that sophistical argument put forth the last year in a pamphlet entitled, "Thoughts on Slavery", in which the [anonymous] author endeavors to prove, by the curse pronounced upon Canaan, that Southern slavery is a Bible institution sanctioned by the God of heaven!! Proceeding in his lecture, Mr. [A. ran] a tilt against Prof. Agassiz, who has recently made an attack upon Divine Revelation, by denying that 'God made of one blood all nations of men to dwell on all the face of the earth,' and completely unhorsing him, knocked him back into the Dark Ages to flounder on through the chaos of his own conflicting opinions with Linnæus, Buffon, Helvetius, Monboddo and Darwin—men who once advocated the same absurd theory, that the human race originated from different sources. Mr. A. also showed that the diversities among the different nations of mankind were produced by the influence which climate, hard treatment, and different kinds of food had upon the animal frame and the color of the skin."

=== Characteristics of the African "race" ===
"Mr. Allen commenced with the somewhat startling assertion, that the Africans originated the arts and sciences [in Ethiopia] and gave the first impulse to civilization."

The African race, "more than any other race" appreciates "the good, the beautiful, the artistic, [and] the religious". "In musical gifts", it "is superior to other races". These traits are contrasted with those of the "Anglo-Saxon race", which are "physical force, calculating intellect, daring enterprise, and love of gain". It is "fierce, active, and warlike", combining "calculating intellect and physical force".

=== Nations require the combination of races ===
Allen proposed an idea radical in his day: "Nations, worthy of the name, could only be produced by a fusion of races require a mixture of races." Clearly he is thinking of the United States, and proposing that the black and white "races" are both needed to make America great.

The African race, in musical gifts, is superior to other races; but what sort of a nation [would a race] of mere musicians, however superior[,] be? The African race is superior to other races, also, in kindness and religious tendencies; but what sort of a nation would a race of mere kind, religious folks, however kind and pious, be? The Anglo-Saxon race is superior to other races in calculating intellect and physical force; but what sort of a nation would a race of mere calculating intellects and physical men, however superior, be?

No fact stands out more clearly in the pages of history, to those who are willing to see it, than that nations, worthy of the name, are only produced by a fusion of races. The civilization of the African, unmingled with the civilization of any other race, while it would develop[,] more largely than any other race, the good, the beautiful, the artistic, [and] the religious, [it] would develop too little of physical force, calculating intellect, daring enterprise, and love of gain, to make a nation great, energetic and powerful. The civilization of the Anglo-Saxon, unmingled with the civilization of any other race, would develop too much of the fierce, active, and warlike, and too little of the kind, gentle, charitable, and merciful, to make a nation stable, grand, and truly great. The greatness of the American nation is, unquestionably[,] owing ["owning" in the original] no less to the various elements of which it is composed, than to its climate and favorable circumstances. Harmony of character, which is the soul of true greatness, is only produced, by a bringing together of qualities of mind and heart which are dissimilar, not antagonistic.

=== Characteristics of the African race ===
- Allen, William G. (November 5, 1852). "[Letter to the editor]". Frederick Douglass' Paper. Rochester, New York. p. 2. Defends Horace Mann.
- August 27, 1850, Danvers, Massachusetts: "A very able and interesting lecture was delivered last Tuesday evening, in the vestry of the Old South Church in Danvers, by Mr. Wm. G. Allen, a colored law student of Boston, on the 'Origin and History of the Africans.'"

Mr. Allen commenced with the somewhat startling assertion, that the Africans originated the arts and sciences, and gave the first impulse to civilization. How different this idea from the notion entertained by great numbers in this country, at the present day, some of whom would endeavor to persuade themselves and others to believe that the negro is but a mere connecting link between the brute creation and the human race! But the speaker sustained his position by the most irrefragible proofs, drawn from the past history of the world, evincing a depth of research to which few men of any profession can lay claim. He seemed indeed to be perfectly familiar with every branch of the human family, as far back as the days of Noah, and to possess an intimate acquaintance with all the writings extant of every historian, both ancient and modern.

With one stroke of his logic, he let the wind out of that sophistical argument put forth the last year in a pamphlet entitled, "Thoughts on Slavery", in which the author endeavors to prove, by the curse pronounced upon Canaan, that Southern slavery is a Bible institution sanctioned by the God of heaven!! Proceeding in his lecture, Mr. [A. ran] a tilt against Prof. Agassiz, who has recently made an attack upon Divine Revelation, by denying that 'God made of one blood all nations of men to dwell on all the face of the earth,' and completely unhorsing him, knocked him back into the Dark Ages to flounder on through the chaos of his own conflicting opinions with Linnæus, Buffon, Helvetius, Monboddo and Darwin—men who once advocated the same absurd theory, that the human race originated from different sources. Mr. A. also showed that the diversities among the different nations of mankind were produced by the influence which climate, hard treatment, and different kinds of food had upon the animal frame and the color of the skin.

The lecture was one which would have done honor to the mind of the historian Bancroft, while the gentle and modest demeanor of the speaker, together with the gracefulness of his elocution and ready command of language, gave to the performance an additional interest.

- "The African Race. Lecture". Liverpool Mercury (Liverpool, England). August 26, 1857. p. 4. Archived from the original on July 4, 2019 – via newspapers.com. The newspaper called Allen's lecture it "a real intellectual treat":

Professor Allen then proceeded with his lecture, and from the eloquence and learning which he displayed in dealing with the subject appeared to take the audience completely by surprise. He took a Scriptural view of the origin of the Ethiopians, Egyptians, and other races of ancient Africa, arguing that they were descended from the four sons of Ham; and showed from classic authority the high civilisation to which they had attained when Greece was yet barbarous, and before Rome arose. Herodotus had spoken of the Ethiopians as remarkable for their stature, longevity, and physical beauty; and although in the eyes of the white man they were not remarkable for the latter quality at present, the influence of adverse circumstances and of centuries of oppression should be taken into account. There was scarcely a race, he showed, on the face of the earth, which had not declined in intellectual power and physical beauty under the same influences, and in the mediæval ages, when Englishmen were sold as slaves, they were described by their purchasers, the Irishmen and Romans, as ugly and stupid. The lecturer then dwelt more particularly upon the leading characteristics of the African race, their religious tendency, and the predominance of the moral over the intellectual in their character—the affeetionateness of their disposition, their love of humour, &c. He gave many weighty hits at Anglo-Saxon civilisation, which told well with the audience, who appeared very much delighted. He was listened to with deep attention, and loudly applauded.

- Allen, William G. (December 10, 1853). "Professor Allen and the slavery of America". Leeds Times. "The speaker offered his views on the ways in which the African race had distinguished itself over countless generations as a race focused on morality and love of mankind. He denounced plans regarding the colonization of Siberia with nominally free black citizens, and emphasized the love of America that was pervasive among the African American people." Available at the same url is an mp3 audio file.

According to Allen, nations are born of a combination of races.

=== "American Slavery, the present aspects of the anti-slavery cause, and our duty in relation thereto" ===
Allen delivered many lectures across England and Ireland. The above title was one of two lectures he delivered in Belfast, Ireland, in 1855.

[T]he American nation stands before the world in a shameful position. It has planted its iron heel on a whole race of God's children. It makes its highest mission to be crushing out of existence the mind, conscience, soul of a great race, and then impiously maintaining that mind, conscience, soul, never belonged to that race. When we look at Douglass and others, who, under a mountainload of difficulties, have struggled and risen to their present eminence, we cannot but feel how many noble intellects and exalted spirits of which the world has had no cognizance, have been murdered by this great but rapacious Republic.

He "illustrated the condition of the nominally free colored American—his disabilities in the various states of the Union—also the prevalence and force of that vulgar prejudice which had been so truthfully delineated." In England and Ireland, he spoke about his barely escaping lynching, and having to exile himself, because his skin was the wrong color to marry a white young lady. "Prof. Allen, of New York, gave the audience account of the aristocracy of complexion as established by custom in America, and of the dangers he had incurred, because be had ventured to think and act for himself, without regard to such a regency."

Allen had printed in London and Dublin accounts of his near-lynching and exile, which were sold at his lectures to raise money.

=== America and the Americans ===
A topic of his lectures in Ireland: "America and the Americans".

=== "The great men of a nation are a nation's vitality" ===
On mid-January 1853, Allen gave a lecture "before the Literary Association of this village" (Cortland, New York). His subject was: "The great men of a nation are a nation's vitality, which he illustrated by reference to distinguished statesmen, patriots and reformers, occasionally bringing in a touch of the radicalism [abolitionism] peculiar to that class of men with whom the gentleman acts, and giving the conservatism of the day some rather severe hits."

=== Orators and oratory ===
- "The following is an extract from an address delivered by Prof. Wm. G. Allen, of N.Y. Central College, before the Dialexian Society, of that Institution. We copy it because it is so beautifully written and truthful. The excellent oration from which we have made the extract, we shall lay in part, if not entire, before our readers. For the present, suffice it to say, Mr. Allen, though a colored man, sustains a high literary reputation, and by his learning and ability, is doing much to give character to the Institution with which he is connected."

== Writings ==
- Books and pamphlets
  - Allen, William G. (1860). A Short Personal Narrative. Dublin. (sold by the author)
  - Horton, George Moses; Plácido (Gabriel de la Concepción Valdés) [in Spanish] (1856). Allen, [William G.] (ed.). The African poets, Horton and Placido: with an introduction by Professor Allen. Dublin. Archived from the original on September 27, 2023.
  - Allen, William G., "a refugee from American despotism" (1853). The American Prejudice Against Color: An Authentic Narrative, Showing How Easily the Nation Got into an Uproar. London.
  - Allen, William G. (1849). Wheatley, Banneker and Horton. With selections from the poetical works of Wheatley and Horton, and the letter of Washington to Wheatley, and of Jefferson to Banneker. Boston. Reprinted in 1970 by Books for Libraries Press, ISBN 0836986571 Studies Phyllis Wheatley, Benjamin Banneker, and George Moses Horton.
  - Allen, William G. (1848). The African race: an essay for the times. Boston. OCLC 480197709.
- Published correspondence
  - Allen, Wm. G. (August 15, 1853). "Letter to William B. Garrison". Frederick Douglass' Paper – via accessiblearchives.com.
  - Allen, Wm. G. (July 22, 1853). "Letter from Professor Wm. G. Allen" (PNG). The Liberator. p. 4. Comments on England. Reprinted in Frederick Douglass' Paper, August 5, 1853.
  - Allen, Wm G. (18 February 1853). "To the public". The Liberator. p. 3 – via newspapers.com.
  - Allen, William G. (November 26, 1852). "Letter from Prof. Wm. G. Allen" (PNG). The Liberator. p. 2. On Horace Mann.
  - Allen, Wm. G. (November 12, 1852). "Letter from Wm. G. Allen". Frederick Douglass' Paper – via accessiblearchives.con. On Beriah Green.
  - Allen, William G. (October 29, 1852). "Jerry rescue celebration". Frederick Douglass' Paper. p. 1 – via accessiblearchives.com. Reprinted from the Pennsylvania Freeman.
  - Allen, William G. (August 13, 1852). "Letter from William G. Allen". Frederick Douglass' Paper. p. 3 – via accessiblearchives.com.
  - Allen, William G. (June 30, 1852). "Letter from William G. Allen". Frederick Douglass' Paper – via accessible-archives.com. On Jews and on races.
  - Allen, William G. (June 10, 1852). "Letter from William G. Allen". Frederick Douglass' Paper – via accessible-archives.com. On the Anglo-Saxon and African "nationalities".
  - Allen, William G. (May 20, 1852). "Letter from Wm. G. Allen". Frederick Douglass' Paper – via accessiblearchives.com. "[I]ts descriptions stir the blood" and "indeed almost make it leap out of the heart". However, he regretted "that the chapter favoring colonization was ever written." Includes discussion of Uncle Tom's Cabin
  - Allen, William G. (April 29, 1852). "Letter from William G. Allen". Frederick Douglass' Paper – via accessible-archives.com. On Benjamin Banneker
  - Allen, William G. (January 1, 1852). "Letter from William G. Allen". Frederick Douglass' Paper. p. 1 – via accessiblearchives.com. On the Hungarian hero Lajos Kossuth. Reprinted in The Liberator, January 9, 1852.
  - Allen, William G. (December 11, 1851). "Letter from William G. allen". Frederick Douglass' Paper – via accessiblearchives.com. Pledges $10 as support "for the establishing of a Semi-Weekly paper published by yourself".
  - Allen, William G. (June 26, 1851). "[Letter to the editor]". Frederick Douglass' Paper – via accessiblearchives.com. Forwards "some lines written by a young lady of this Institution, upon the death of Miss Anna E. Pierce and Joseph P. Purvis, students of New York Central College".
  - Allen, William G. (June 1, 1851). "Letter to the editor". Voice of the Fugitive – via Center for Research Libraries. Editorial note on Allen in same issue
- Manuscript
  - Allen, William G.; Allen, Mary King (c. 1853). Sea-weeds collected on the British coast, presented to the Boston Anti-Slavery Bazaar. Leeds, England. OCLC 63891436. "30 leaves, 20 of them with delicately mounted sea weed specimens with mss. descriptions, poetry, religious sentiments interspersed." Held by Cornell University Library.
  - Allen, William G. (June 22, 1853), Cover letter accompanying letter sent to Garrison for publication (above), Boston Public Library

== Studies of Allen ==
- Sherwood, Marika (2011). "William G. Allen in Britain". Ethnicity and Race in a Changing World. 2 (2): 53+ – via Gale Academic OneFile.
- McClish, Glen (2005). "William G. Allen's 'Orators and Oratory': Inventional Amalgamation, Pathos, and the Characterization of Violence in African-American Abolitionist Rhetoric". Rhetoric Society Quarterly. 35 (1): 47–72. doi:10.1080/02773940509391303. JSTOR 40232452. S2CID 143786341.
- Elbert, Sarah (2002). "An Inter-Racial Love Story in Fact and Fiction: William and Mary King Allen's Marriage and Louisa May Alcott's Tale, 'M.L.'". History Workshop Journal. 53 (1): 17–42. doi:10.1093/hwj/53.1.17. JSTOR 4289772.
- Blackett, R. J. M. (March 1980). "William G. Allen: The Forgotten Professor". Civil War History. 26 (1): 39–52. doi:10.1353/cwh.1980.0018. S2CID 144941523.
