= Joel Prentiss Bishop =

American lawyer

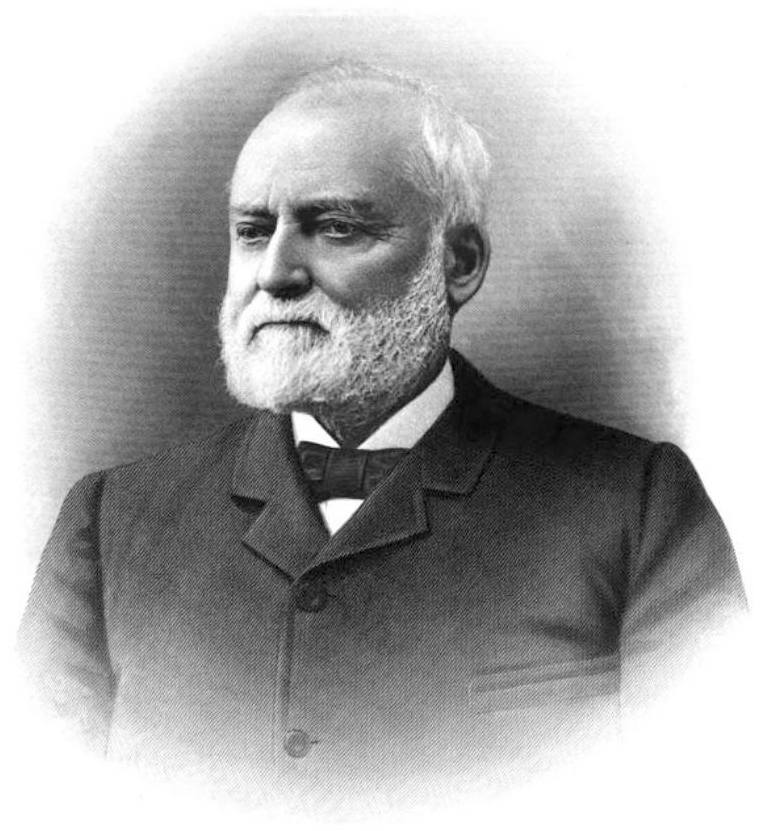
- Born: March 10, 1814; Volney, New York, U.S.
- Died: November 4, 1901 (aged 87); Cambridge, Massachusetts, U.S.
- Known for: Legal treatise writer

Signature
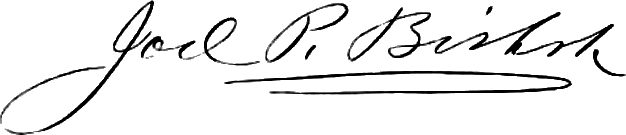

Joel Prentiss Bishop (March 10, 1814 (Note: The New York Times 1901.) – November 4, 1901) was an American lawyer and legal treatise writer, referred to by more than one commentator as "the foremost law writer of the age".

== Early life ==
Bishop was born in a "small log house in the woods" in Oswego County, New York. His mother died shortly thereafter, and he and his father farmed sixty acres in Paris, Oneida County, New York. His rural schoolmasters at Oneida Institute and Stockbridge Academy recognized his gifts and urged his father to allow him to get further education. At sixteen he began supporting additional study by teaching in public schools, but his health broke, and he was forced at 21 to find a less strenuous occupation.

== Abolitionist and early legal career ==
Bishop had grown to maturity during the Second Great Awakening in the "burned-over district" of upstate New York, and throughout his life he retained a commitment to evangelical Protestantism. For seven years, he worked as general business manager, publishing agent, and assistant treasurer of the New York Anti-slavery Society and assistant editor of the Friend of Man, an abolitionist newspaper. In 1842, he "drifted to Boston" where he edited the Social Monitor and Orphan's Advocate and began working in a law office. Within sixteen months he had been admitted to the bar and opened a law office.

== Legal writer ==
To enhance his reputation as a knowledgeable practitioner, Bishop wrote Commentaries on the Law of Marriage and Divorce (1852), which brought him "a constant succession of requests and advice to write other books". Bishop then resolved to abandon legal practice, "to retire ... from the world", ignoring the more lucrative career of legal practice for a life of scholarship, which he said might "make an impress for good on the law, and leave the world a gainer by my having lived in it".

Bishop wrote a book on jurisprudence and legal study and a succession of treatises on family law, criminal law and procedure, statutory interpretation, contract, and tort law, "many of which he shepherded through divers thoroughly revised editions". Although his some of his commentaries were simple hornbooks, his commentaries on marriage and divorce and on criminal law and procedure were "highly original and thorough works that significantly influenced their fields". Bishop's books were well received, "judges adopted his views, and practitioners sought his advice." In 1884, the University of Berne awarded him an honorary degree. Perhaps even more remarkable was that with no college education, Bishop made himself into a professional scholar during an era when most were independently wealthy or members of a university faculty.

Like many late nineteenth-century legal thinkers, Bishop believed that law was a science, that legal rules were "the deductive elaboration of its fundamental principles". Nevertheless, unlike his notable contemporaries at Harvard Law School, including Christopher Columbus Langdell, Bishop asserted that common law stood on a foundation of religious and moral principle and that learned and upright judges would listen to their God-given faculty of moral sense when rendering decisions. Appellate court decisions therefore reflected underlying moral principles and not simply arbitrary human opinions.

== Personal life ==
On January 4, 1836, Bishop married a widow, Angeline Pattice Margaretta Hout, in Berkeley County, Virginia. They were divorced on April 7, 1845, in Boston, Massachusetts. Bishop married Mary Alice Perkins (1827–1901) on April 18, 1845, in Amesbury, Essex, Massachusetts. They had at least two sons and a daughter. Bishop died of "apoplexy" on November 4, 1901.

== Works ==
- Commentaries on the Law of Marriage and Divorce (1852)
- Commentaries on the Criminal Law (1856–1858)
- Commentaries on the Law of Criminal Procedure (1866)
- First Book of the Law (1868)
- Commentaries on the Law of Married Women (1871–1875)
- Commentaries on the Written Laws and Their Interpretation (1882)
- Commentaries on the Law of Contracts (1887)
- Commentaries on the Non-Contract Law and especially as to Common Affairs not of Contract or the EveryDay Rights and Torts (1889)
