= Dixwell Avenue Congregational United Church of Christ =

Historic church in Connecticut, United States

- U.S. National Register of Historic Places
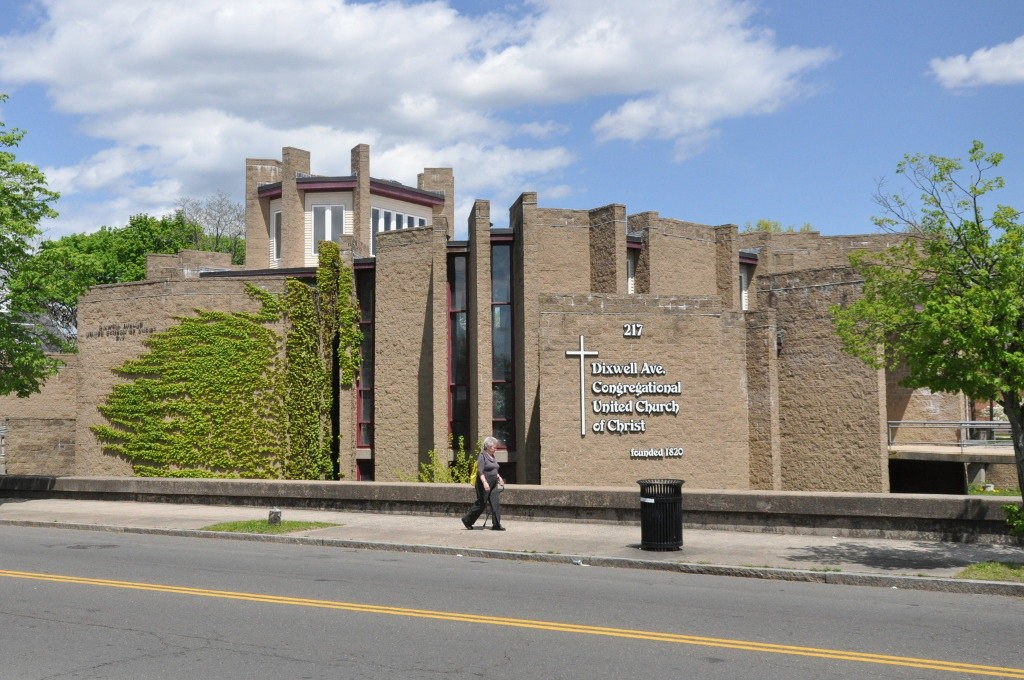

- Location within Connecticut Location within the United States
- Location: 217 Dixwell Avenue, New Haven, Connecticut
- Coordinates: 41°19′08″N 72°56′02″W
- Area: 1 acre (0.40 ha)
- Built: 1968
- Architect: John M. Johansen
- Architectural style: Brutalist
- NRHP reference No.: 100003148)
- Added to NRHP: November 29, 2018

The Dixwell Avenue Congregational United Church of Christ is a historic church at 217 Dixwell Avenue in New Haven, Connecticut. Founded in 1820 as the African Ecclesiastical Society, the congregation has been a major part of African-American society in the city since then. Its current church building, completed in 1969, is a major local example of Brutalist architecture, designed by John M. Johansen. It was listed on the National Register of Historic Places for its architecture in 2018.

== Congregation ==
The congregation was organized by a group of 24 free African Americans and a white man, Simeon Jocelyn, in 1820. After first meeting on Temple Street, the congregation moved to Dixwell Avenue in the 1880s. In the 19th century, the church and its parishioners served as part of the Underground Railroad, and were active in protesting and supporting the Africans of La Amistad who were imprisoned in New Haven. In the 20th century, the church was included in efforts by the city to redevelop the Dixwell Avenue area.

== Building ==
Prior to construction of the present building, the congregation was meeting in a building at 100 Dixwell Avenue. In the 1950s, the city embarked on an urban renewal project in the area, which included a major public space in the block bounded by Dixwell Avenue, Foote, Admiral, and Ashmun Streets. The new church building was to be one of the anchors of this development, and was ultimately the only major element of the redevelopment to be built beyond the plaza space. The entire development project was developed by architect John M. Johansen.

The church has a sunken setting relative to the plaza and sited at the plaza's northwest corner. It is connected to the street and the plaza by pedestrian bridges, which provide entry into the main level of the building. The building is organized with a roughly circular center, or lantern, from which other elements radiate. The radiating elements have split-concrete sidewalls of varying heights, with two-story window bays at the ends. The central lantern functions as a light well for the main sanctuary. The outer elements include offices, classrooms, and other small meeting spaces, and there is a large secondary meeting space on the lower level below the sanctuary.

== Organizing ==
Jocelyn helped organize plans for a college in New Haven for African Americans that would have been the first in the United States. The plan drew opposition and a 700 to 4 vote against it. David Daggett, a founder of Yale Law School, former U.S. Senator, and former mayor of New Haven helped organized against it. Jocelyn resigned in the wake of the defeated plan. Jocelyn's home was attacked a few years later. A white mob destroyed a black-owned hotel, a black-owned property, and Arthur Tappan's summer home. There was no college for African Americans in the country until the black-owned Wilberforce University opened in Ohio in 1856. Daggett went on to preside over the prosecution of Prudence Crandall who ran the Canterbury Female Boarding School in Canterbury, Connecticut. Crandall was arrested and tried in court for violating the Black Law, which prevented the teaching of "any colored person who is not an inhabitant of any town of this state" without the town's permission. Jocelyn organized during the La Amistad incident. He and his brother Nathan were involved with the Underground Railroad.

== See also ==
- National Register of Historic Places listings in New Haven, Connecticut
