= Edward Davies (minister) =

American minister, author and publisher

Edward Davies (1827–December 8, 1905) was an American minister, author, and publisher of the Welsh Congregational magazine, the Cenhadwr. He was a pastor of Congregational, Peniel, and Bethel churches in the state of New York.

== Early life ==
His parents from Llanuwchllyn, Merionethshire were William and Catherine Davies. They emigrated from Wales and to the United States and settled in the state of New York. They first lived in New York City, where Davies was born in 1827. He was the fourth of five children. Two years later, they moved to Bethel, the wilderness area of northern Remsen in Oneida County, New York.

== Career ==
=== Pastor ===
As a preacher, Mr. Davies’ sermons were distinguished by purity of diction and solidarity of thought, and were instructive, practical and spiritual. In the pulpit, as well as elsewhere, he was an unrelenting foe of the evils of the times, especially intemperance, which he fought faithfully and untiringly since his youth.

Davies studied for the ministry at the Whitestown Seminary and then with Morris Roberts (1799–1878) for the ministry. He began to preach in 1848. In 1853, he was ordained. His first appointment as pastor was in Waterville at the Welsh Congregational Church, where he served for seventeen years. Continuing to live in Waterville, he ministered at the Deansboro and the Oriskany Falls' English Congregational churches. In 1882, Davies moved to Remsen and was then pastor of Peniel and Bethel churches for two years. Becoming a pastor of what became a Bethel church at Steuben and then made his final move to Waterville, where he was a minister in 1898.

He visited Welsh communities throughout the United States and in 1868 visited and preached in Wales for three months. He traveled there with Morris Roberts.

=== Writer and publisher ===
Among his published writings were Grawnwin Aeddfed, published in 1867 and Cofiant … Morris Roberts, which was published in 1879. He moved to Remsen where he published the Welsh Congregational magazine, the Cenhadwr, that he purchased in 1882. It was published from Waterville from 1898 until 1901, when it ceased publication.

He wrote the biographies, The Life of Morris Roberts and The Life of Llewellyn D. Howell. He visited Welsh communities throughout the United States and in 1868 visited and preached in Wales for three months. He traveled there with Morris Roberts.

== Personal life ==
He married in 1849, with whom they had two daughters and a son. He was a Prohibitionist and abolitionist. He visited Welsh communities throughout the United States and in 1868 visited and preached in Wales for three months. He traveled there with Morris Roberts.

In his later years, Davies had been in poor health and then contracted a case of influenza for which he continued to have complications. He died on December 8, 1905.
