= Oneida Institute =

School in upstate New York (1827–1843)

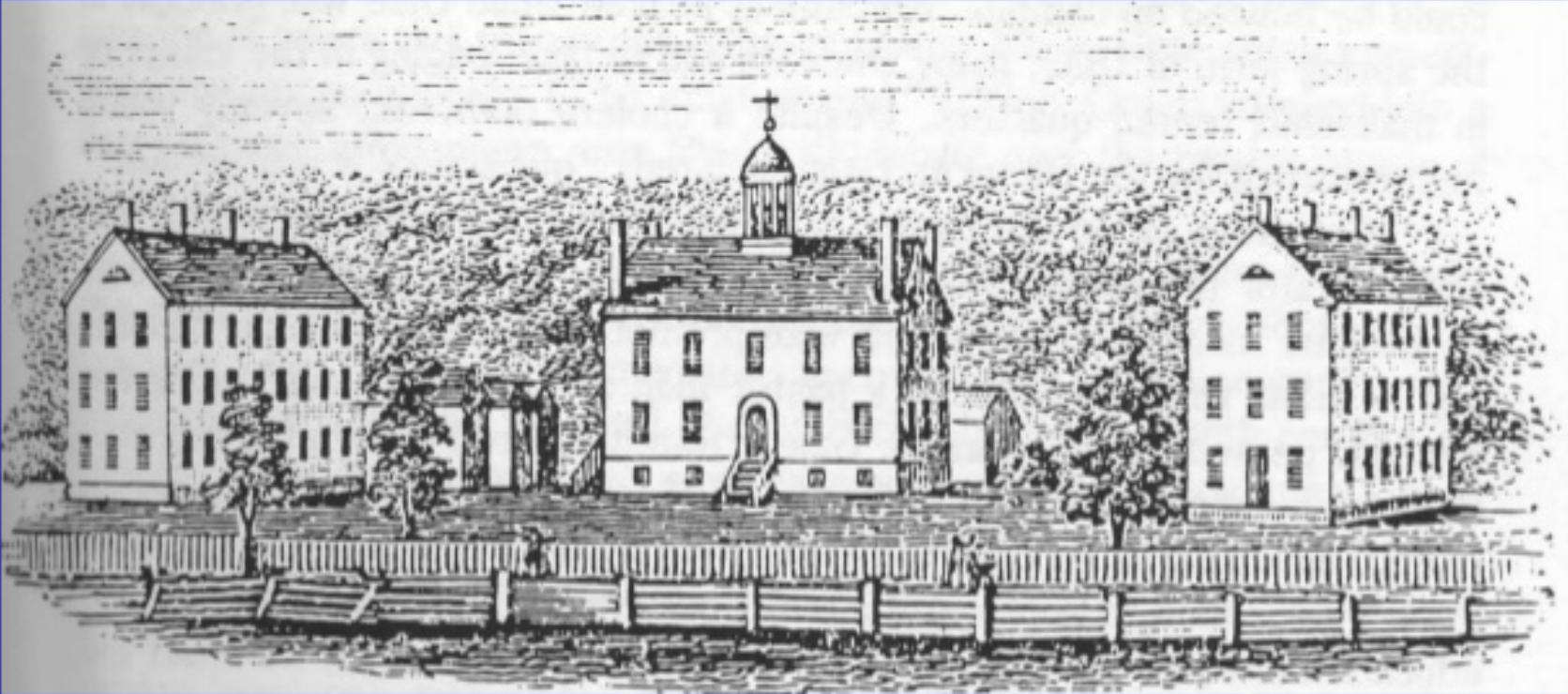
- Other names: Oneida Institute of Science and Industry; Whitestown Seminary
- Active: 1827–1843
- Religious affiliation: Presbyterian
- President: George Washington Gale (1827–1833); Beriah Green (1833–1843)
- Location: Whitesboro, NY, USA; 43°07′10″N 75°17′10″W
- Campus: 114 acres (46 ha)

The Oneida Institute (/oʊˈnaɪdə/ oh-NYE-də) was a short-lived Presbyterian school in Whitesboro, New York, United States, that was a national leader in the emerging abolitionist movement. Existing from 1827 to 1843, the school was radical and the first that accepted both Black and White students in the United States. According to Earnest Elmo Calkins, Oneida was "the seed of Lane Seminary, Western Reserve College, Oberlin and Knox colleges."

The Oneida Institute was founded in 1827 by George Washington Gale as the Oneida Institute of Science and Industry. His former teacher (in the Addison County Grammar School, Middlebury, Vermont, 1807–1808) John Frost, now a Presbyterian minister in Whitesboro with Harriet Lavinia (Gold) Frost his wife — daughter of Thomas Ruggles Gold, — who was the primary partner in setting up the institute, bringing her considerable wealth to the enterprise. They raised $20,000, a significant part of which was from the philanthropist and abolitionist brothers Arthur and Lewis Tappan; Arthur had helped various "western" institutions, to the extent of tens of thousands of dollars, "but his favorite among them was Oneida Institute". (In the early 19th century, Utica was western, the gateway to western New York.) With this they bought 115 acres of land and began construction of the buildings. The institute occupied "more than 100 acres (40 ha) bordered by Main Street and the Mohawk River and by Ellis and Ablett Avenues in Whitesboro village."

The first student movement in the country, the Lane Rebels, began at Oneida. A contingent of about 24, with an acknowledged leader (Theodore Dwight Weld), left Oneida for Lane and then, more publicly, soon left Lane for Oberlin. Oneida's first president, Gale, founded Knox Manual Labor Institute, later Knox College, in Galesburg, Illinois. Oneida hired its second president, Beriah Green, from Oberlin's competitor in northeast Ohio, Western Reserve College. All of these institutions and people are very much linked to the explosively emerging topic of the abolition of slavery.

== The first president: George Washington Gale ==
The institute opened in May 1827 with 2 instructors, Gale and Pelatiah Rawson (sometimes spelled Peletiah), the latter a Hamilton College graduate and engineer that had worked on the just-completed Erie Canal. There were initially 20 students, including most of the 7 that had been working in exchange for instruction on Gale's farm in Western, New York, a pilot project. Theodore Weld, who would become the leader of the students, was among them, as was evangelist and future Oberlin president Charles Grandison Finney. Enrollment soon grew to 100, and by 1830, 500 applicants were turned away for lack of space. It was chartered in 1829 as the Oneida Institute of Science and Industry. Through Frost, it was "intimately connected" with the Presbyterian church of Whitesboro.

Oneida was the first and leading American example of the manual labor college, which Gale thought he had originated, although there were earlier examples, and Weld had proposed a manual labor program unsuccessfully to Hamilton College. Gale's goal was to supplement study with the physical and spiritual or psychological benefits of exercise; for the time this was an innovative and informed position. By "unit[ing] classical education with agricultural, horticultural, and mechanical labor," Gale was also trying to make education more affordable. "Students worked on the farm, or in the carpenter, trunk and harness-making shops"; a printing shop was added later. The first year, floods destroyed the crops, but the second year, students

produced fifty cords of wood, thirty barrels of cider, seven hundred bushels of corn, four hundred of potatoes, one hundred of oats, twenty-five of beans, thirty tons of hay, and eighty bushels of onions—the whole valued at $1000 [equivalent to $30,234 in 2025].

"Religious fervor was kept at a white heat. Studies were interrupted to hold protracted revival meetings." Gale replaced the study of Latin and Classical Greek with Hebrew and Biblical Greek. This change, especially regarding Latin, was vigorously opposed by the Presbyterian Presbytery, with financial consequences. According to a modern scholar, studying at Oneida at this time "required substantial emotional stability."

The charismatic, influential Christian revivalist Charles Finney had been a student of Gale prior to Oneida, and Gale sought at Oneida to train students "as emissaries of the new revivalism". "The result was a large crop of crusaders and reformers, who were later turned loose to fulminate against drink, slavery, Sabbath breaking, [and] irreligion, some of whom became famous in their proseletyzing fields."

Gale "lacked the qualities of a leader". In the summer of 1833 a debate on colonization led to the formation of a colonization and an anti-slavery society.

Student dissatisfaction led to a mass walk-out in 1832, with about 24 students leaving for Lane, then Oberlin. Gale soon desired to be replaced; he went to Illinois, where he began Galesburg, Illinois, and the Knox Manual Labor College, which in 1857 became Knox College. Gale left the institute with "fiscal problems", saddled with "numerous financial obligations".

=== The "Lane Rebels" ===
Theodore Dwight Weld, who had studied at Oneida from 1827 to 1830, was dissatisfied with Gale's leadership. He led a 1833 exodus of "Oneida boys...disenchanted with Gale's leadership and the lack of regular theological courses"; they rafted down the French and Allegheny rivers to Cincinnati, and constituted 24 of the 40 members of the Lane Seminary's original student body.

== The second and last president: Beriah Green ==
It was an heroic age — an age in which principles of truth were striving for recognition in the lives of those bold enough to be right, rather than popular. Among the few institutions that dared to risk their success upon the carrying out of ideas hostile in their time, was the Oneida Institute, at Whitesboro, New York. It was the hot-bed of radicalism as it existed at that day. Many of its ideas have become a part of the national life; while others are still on debatable ground. There was a heavy brain at its head; and there were great men back of it.

After a search, the trustees settled on abolitionist firebrand Beriah Green, who started in 1833, and "for whom Gale had nothing but scorn". The school was dominated by Green's personality and was known as "President Green's school".

=== Curriculum ===
Green "revamped Oneida's curriculum by giving greater attention to the study of ethics or moral philosophy than was the case during Gale's tenure, or indeed at most American colleges in the 1830s." He replaced the study of Latin and classical Greek with Hebrew and New Testament Greek.

In 1836 (another source says 1838), in the "juvenile department", William Whipple Warren studied arithmetic, English grammar, geography, and "the Greek of Matthew's gospel". In 1843, a letter seeking funds gives the "Course of Study" as "Greek, Hebrew, arithmetic, bookkeeping, algebra, anatomy, physiology, geometry, natural philosophy [studying nature, forerunner of science], natural theology, evidences of Christianity, political economy, science of government, exercises in declamation and composition."

For admittance to the school, Green stated:

It is expected of those who would enjoy the advantages offered at the Oneida Institute, that they furnish trustworthy testimonials of good mental and moral character, be competent to teach a common English school, and able to recite the Greek Grammar, and profess the design of pursuing our course of study fully. These advantages we do not confine to those who may expect ultimately to enter the ministry.

=== Abolitionism; admitting Black students ===
The curriculum was in line with Green's goal of training abolitionist activists, which he believed was what Christianity mandated. Abolitionism was a "sacred vocation". The institute under Green was "an abolition college", "a hotbed of anti-slavery activity," "abolitionist to the core, more so than any other American college." As put in a hostile letter to the editor of 1837, "young men are taught to despise the arrangements of society." National abolitionist leader Gerrit Smith was made a trustee. Oneida and Whitestown Anti-Slavery Societies were soon formed, declaring that slavery was not just an evil, it was a crime and a sin.

Green accepted the job on two conditions: that he be allowed to preach "immediatism", the immediate emancipation of slaves, and that it be allowed to admit African-American students. These were agreed to. Prior to Green, there had not been any Black students at Oneida; so far as is known, none had applied.

In 1833, allowing African-American students into educational institutions alongside whites was controversial at best, and aroused bitter, even violent opposition. (Even schools for black students only could be the object of violence.) While there had been one African-American graduate each from Amherst, Bowdoin, and Middlebury, these were exceptional cases. The Noyes Academy in New Hampshire was destroyed in 1835 after it admitted African-American students; farmers with ninety yoke of oxen dragged the academy building to a corner of the Common, leaving it "shattered, mutilated, inwardly beyond reparation almost." Four of its students then enrolled at Oneida. The city of New Haven in 1831 unexpectedly and decisively prevented the setting up of "a new college for the instruction of colored youth", of which there was none in United States. (See Simeon Jocelyn.) In New York, the American Colonization Society would not allow even a lecture series for blacks on history. The Canterbury Female Boarding School, in Canterbury, Connecticut, was forced to close after it admitted one African-American girl in 1832, and the school for "young ladies and little misses of color" which replaced it was met with such escalating violence from the townspeople that director Prudence Crandall was forced to close it out of concern for the students' safety. New-York Central College was forced to close in part because of local hostility to education of African Americans, and even more so to African-American professors.

A month before Green's arrival in August 1832, 35 students formed an antislavery society on immediatist principles, the first in New York State. 34 students formed a colonization society; colonization was not in favor of full emancipation, and thought the best place for free blacks was "back to Africa", e.g. Liberia.

In his inaugural address, Green called for "immediate, unconditional, and uncompensated emancipation". Compensated emancipation meant that owners of released slaves would be compensated for the loss of their "property", as they were, in part, when the District of Columbia's slaves were emancipated in 1862.

In this environment Oneida admitted African-American students, the first college in the country to admit them without restrictions. According to alumnus Alexander Crummell, there was "perfect equality" between the black and white students.

There were generally 10–14 "colored students". In 1840, "including Indian blood", there were 20.

=== Finances ===
When Green became president, the institute was in debt. American abolitionists, including Gerrit Smith, pledged $65,000 (equivalent to $1,965,000 in 2025) towards the support of the institute, although because of the Panic of 1837 not all were able to fulfill their pledges. The Panic left the institute $9,000 in debt.

In 1839 Green and the other faculty published in The Colored American an appeal for donations.

=== Enrollment ===
Before 1840, there was an average of 100 students. After incurring the large debt (Charles Stuart called it "embarrassments"), "in 1841 the instructors relinquished nearly all of their salaries", and enrollment was cut to 25; the following year, 50–75. Just before closure, counting the president there were four professors, "and an able financier".

The school's transformation into a "hotbed of abolition" was not well received by authorities. Milton Sernett called it, under Green, "far too radical for its time". "[T]he education societies withdrew their aid from its students, because its course of study substituted Hebrew for Latin, and it was called an Institute, not an Academy, College, or Theological School. And the charges that have been sung among the pro-slavery influences of church and state around it, on the 'nigger school' cannot well be numbered." According to Sernett, the Presbyterian Education Society and the American Education Society "struck Oneida Institute from its list of approved schools" in 1834. Another source says this was in 1839.

In 1836, the New York Senate passed a resolution "directing the Committee on Literature [schools] to inquire into the propriety of denying the Oneida Institute all participation in the Benefits of the Literature Fund." This was because it was "regarded as the hot-bed of sedition, [and] that Beriah Green, the principal, had been active and successful in propagating the doctrines of abolitionism." The Legislature took no action after more than 150 people met to protest and to demand academic freedom.

During 1833–1834 Frost's employment is specified as "Agent, Oneida Institute". By 1835 Frost had left Whitesboro for a pulpit in Elmira (which he helped make an Underground Railroad center). His replacement, David Ogden, was not an abolitionist. This led to a withdrawal from the Whitesboro Presbyterian Church of "seventy-one communicant members, including most of the elders", to form a new Congregational church under Green's direction. As a result, "Green and his school [were left] with fewer and fewer friends"; he could no longer turn to churches for funding.

The Oneida Institute ceased operations in 1843. One factor was the New York Anti-Slavery Society's failure to pay the institute $2000 for the printing costs of their paper Friend of Man, but even if it had, there was no way to make the institute financially viable. According to Dana Bigelow, "Green left the institution a wreck". He identifies the causes of its failure as three: first, the manual labor scheme; "unskilled labor was found to be unprofitable". (The $1000 mentioned above, received from crops, did not cover the costs of their production.) Second, replacing the classics with the Bible: "this did much to disconnect the institution with the general theory and habit of culture in the country and to stamp it with a certain reputation of singularity which could not fail to be in many ways disastrous." Finally, the treating of black and white students equally, and its "iconoclastic zeal for the overthrow of social institutions and interests", led to "much popular odium". According to Bigelow, this was a factor in fundraiser Frost's departure.

"Oneida was the seed of Lane Theological Seminary [c. 1830], Western Reserve University [1826], Oberlin [1833] and Knox College [1837]." Through the Whitestown Seminary it is also a predecessor of Bates College (1855). A graduate, William G. Allen, became the second African-American professor in the country at nearby New-York Central College, which also admitted African-American students and was also short-lived.

== Whitestown Seminary and afterwards ==
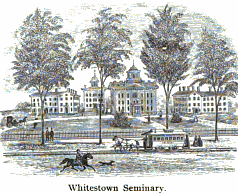
Whitestown Seminary

To satisfy debts its facilities were sold to the Free Will Baptists, who created the Whitestown Seminary in 1844. A condition of the sale was that the new seminary admit students of "all colors". Several Oneida Institute students enrolled. It was consolidated in 1845 with the Clinton Seminary. Whitestown Seminary merged with the Cobb Divinity School to form the Free Will Baptist Bible School, which moved to the New Hampton Institute in 1854 before moving to Bates College in 1870 and eventually merging with the school's religion department. However, the Whitestown Seminary in Whitestown was publishing a catalog as late as 1878.

A predecessor of the Whitestown Seminary was the school of H. H. Kellogg, in Clinton. Elizabeth, "lady principal", daughter of Robert Everett, two of whose brothers attended the Oneida Institute, married John Jay Butler.

According to Appletons' Cyclopædia of American Biography, in 1845 Green founded a Manual Labor School in Whitesboro.

The school buildings are no longer standing, and the campus land has been reused for a factory, a funeral home, and some residences.

== Students ==
Green's policy was to accept any qualified student that applied. As a result, student Grinnell described the student body as "a motley company", consisting of:

emancipators' boys from Cuba; mulattoes; a Spanish student [from Minorca]; an Indian named Kunkapot; black men who had served as sailors, or as city hackmen [drivers], also the purest Africans escaped from slavery; sons of American radicals; Bible students scanning Hebrew verse with ease, in the place of Latin odes; enthusiasts, plowboys and printers; also real students of elegant tastes, captured by the genius of President Green.

=== Alumni of the Oneida Institute ===
==== African-American students ====
Listed in bold are students who were at the Noyes Institute before it was destroyed, in August 1835. No Black students from Oneida enrolled at Lane.

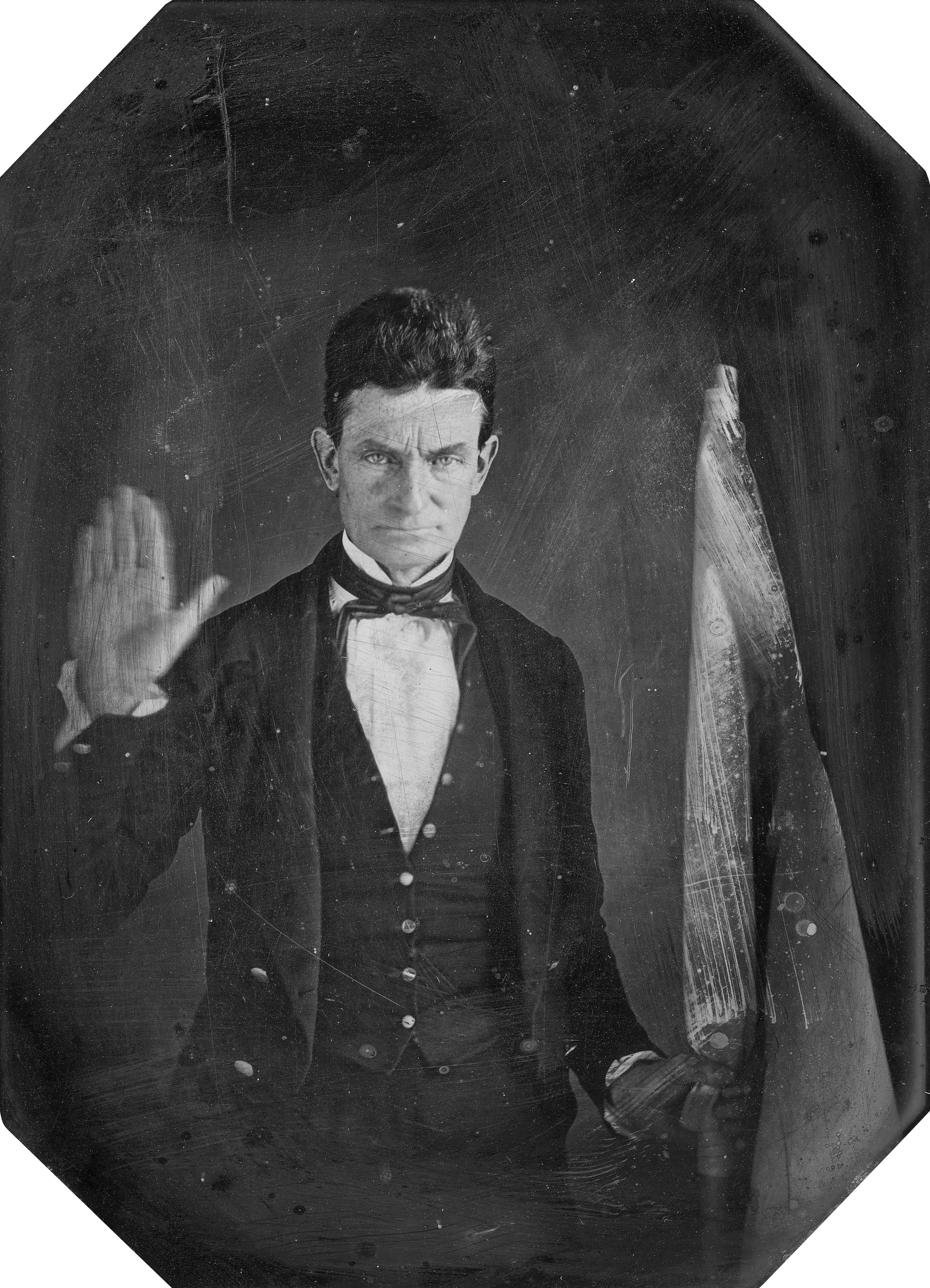
Daguerreotype of John Brown by Augustus Washington, c. 1846

- William G. Allen (1820–1888), lecturer and professor at New-York Central College, the first college to employ African-American professors
- Amos G. Beman (1812–1872), abolitionist and Congregationalist pastor in New Haven, Connecticut.
- Garrett A. Cantine, later a teacher and principal of Nevada City Colored Schools. Became a minister.
- **Alexander Crummell** (1819–1898), abolitionist; first an African Methodist Episcopalian minister in Providence, Rhode Island, then a missionary. Formerly a Noyes Institute student.
- John V. DeGrasse, physician
- William D. Forten
- Amos Noë Freeman (1809–1893), teacher, minister, and abolitionist
- **Henry Highland Garnet** (1815–1882), escaped slave, abolitionist, minister, educator, and orator. Became a Congregationalist minister in Troy, New York. Formerly a Noyes Institute student.
- Samuel A. Jackson
- Jermain Wesley Loguen (1813–1872), escaped slave, abolitionist, bishop of the African Methodist Episcopal Zion Church. Known later as the "General Superintendent of the Underground Railroad in the Syracuse area." He did not complete his studies at Oneida.
- Jacob A. Prime. Remained at the Whitestown Seminary after the institute closed. Became a minister.
- Elymus P. Rogers. Had been a student of Gerrit Smith's Peterboro Manual Labor School during the one year of its existence. Became a minister.
- **Thomas S. Sydney** (c. 1818–1841), one of the four Noyes Institute students. With Crummell, started a school for colored students in New York; became principal of the New York Select Academy, a high school. Became a minister.
- Samuel Ringgold Ward (1817–c. 1866), escaped slave, abolitionist, teacher minister, and newspaper editor
- Augustus Washington (c. 1820-1821–1875), later studied at Dartmouth, daguerrotypist, emigrated to Liberia
- **Julia Williams** (1811–1870), abolitionist, future wife of Henry Highland Garnet, whom she met at the Noyes Institute. Before Noyes, was a student in Prudence Crandall's short-lived Canterbury Female Boarding School. Oneida's only known female student, accepted perhaps because she came as part of a group of four from Noyes.

==== Native American students ====
- Kunkapot
- William Whipple Warren (1825–1853), white–Ojibwe historian and interpreter

==== White students ====
Listed in bold are those students who, under the influence of Theodore D. Weld, left Oneida for the Lane Theological Seminary. All of them were white.

- **John Watson Alvord**, Congregational minister; President of the Freedman's Savings Bank, 1868–1874.
- Joel Prentiss Bishop (1814–1901), attorney and legal writer
- Albert A. Bliss (1812–1893), Ohio State Treasurer
- William H. Brand (1824–1891), legislator in New York State
- **George Bristol**
- **Charles Peck Bush** (1809–1857), Michigan legislator
- **Horace Bushnell** (1802–1876). Bushnell and Dresser were the first two to enroll at Lane. In the 1830s he was a minister in Ohio.
- **Amos Dresser** (1812–1904). Bushnell and Dresser were the first two to enroll at Lane. Dresser left Lane with the others, but did not go to Oberlin. In 1835, in a nationally publicized incident, he was tried for possessing anti-slavery publications, convicted, and whipped publicly in Nashville, Tennessee.
- Alexander Duncan, perhaps to be identified with Alexander Duncan (1788–1853), physician and legislator
- John and Robert Everett, who both graduated; they learned the printer's trade working on Friend of Man, and went on to print the Welsh religious magazine Y Cenhadwr americanaidd of their father Robert Everett. Their brother-in-law J.J. Butler was professor of theology in Whitesboro, then went to Lewiston, Maine, and finally to the new Freewill Baptist school, Hillsdale College.
- Charles Grandison Finney (1792–1875), leading revivalist, second president of Oberlin College. Finney was a student of Gale at his pilot project, not the institute itself.
- **Hiram Foote**
- Joseph L. Frothingham, disappeared when he was at Whitesboro about to begin studying.
- Samuel Green, Beriah Green's oldest son, who published information on him.
- Josiah Bushnell Grinnell (1821–1891), U.S. Representative from Iowa, founder of Grinnell, Iowa, benefactor of Grinnell College
- **Augustus Hopkins**
- **Russell Jesse Judd**
- **John J. Miter**
- **Lucius H. Parker** (1807–1872). Graduated from Oberlin Seminary in 1838.
- William F. Peck, later a professor at Oberlin
- **Joseph Hitchcock Payne**
- **Ezra Abell Poole**
- **Samuel Fuller Porter** (1813–1911), from Whitestown.
- **Charles Stewart Renshaw**
- Benjamin Burleigh Smith, missionary to India
- George Stanton, brother of Henry, died of cholera while a student
- **Henry Brewster Stanton** (1805–1887), abolitionist. Future husband of suffragist Elizabeth Cady Stanton, older brother of Robert L.
- **Robert L. Stanton**, younger brother of Henry Brewster
- **James Steele** (1808–1859)
- **Asa A. Stone**
- **Sereno W. Streeter**
- Two sons of abolitionist Lewis Tappan, there on the recommendation of Finney. One was William Tappan.
- Ebenezer Tucker, graduated in 1840; continued his studies at Oberlin. Became a teacher at the integrated Union Literary Institute, in Randolph County, Indiana.
- **Giles Waldo**. One of the "Lane Rebels", but, uniquely, shows up as a student at Oneida after leaving Lane.
- **Calvin Waterbury.** In 1831, "Waterbury got a school at Newark on the Licking River in Ohio. When in the spring Waterbury talked too much temperance, the inhabitants threatened to ride him out of town on a rail. He prudently climbed aboard a raft and floated down to Cincinnati."
- **Augustus Wattles**
- **Edward Weed** "There was a town gathering at Chillicothe on the same day of last week, when Mr. Weed arrived in town on some business; and being known as an abolitionist, some indignities were offered to him—such as shaving his horse, removing the wheels of his wagon, &c.; that Mr. Weed soon after left town, was followed by the mob, his wagon broken to pieces, his horse killed, and at length himself suspended to a tree by a rope of bark, until he was dead."
- **Theodore Dwight Weld** (1803–1895), leading abolitionist, friend of Finney. Studied at Oneida 1827–1830; by 1832, "the most famous of the Oneida students". In 1833 he led a group of 24 who decamped en masse for Lane Seminary, then, after debating slavery at the Seminary was prohibited, to Oberlin.
- **Samuel T. Wells**
- **George Whipple**
- **Hiram Wilson** (1803–1864), abolitionist, founded the school for fugitive slaves in Canada in which William Allen taught in 1841. One of the "Lane rebels".

=== Alumni of the Whitestown Seminary ===
For a list, taken from History of Oneida County, 1667—1878 by Everets and Farriss, see .

- Amos L. Allen (1837–1911), U.S. Representative from Maine
- Lewis A. Brigham (1831–1885), U.S. Representative from New Jersey
- Edward Davies (1827–1905), minister and author
- John Fullonton (1812–1896), Free Baptist Theological School professor, member and chaplain of the New Hampshire House of Representatives
- Jay R. Hinckley (1840–?), member of the Wisconsin State Assembly.
- James Liddell Phillips, physician and missionary
- Jacob A. Prime. Remained at the Whitestown Seminary after the institute closed.
- Evan Pugh (1828–1863), head of the Farmers' High School, then the Agricultural College of Pennsylvania, predecessors of Pennsylvania State University
- Ellis H. Roberts (1827–1918), Treasurer of the United States, 1897–1905
- James Schoolcraft Sherman (1855–1912), Vice President of the United States (1909–1912)
- Mary Traffarn Whitney (1852–1942), minister, editor, social reformer, philanthropist, lecturer

== See also ==
- List of defunct colleges and universities in New York
