= James and Lydia Canning Fuller House =

Historic house in New York, United States

- U.S. National Register of Historic Places
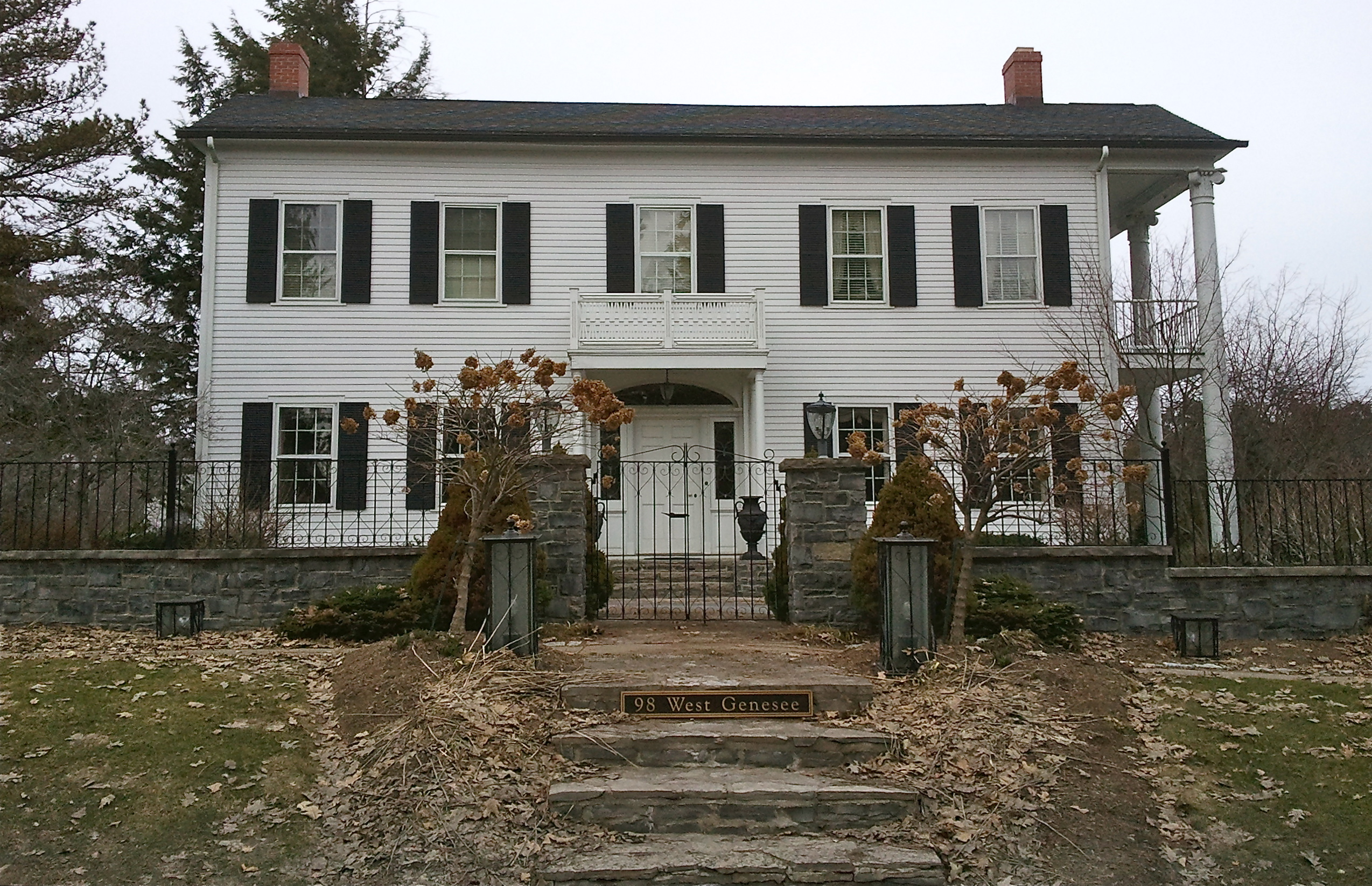

- Location within New York Location within the United States
- Interactive map showing the location for James and Lydia Canning Fuller House
- Location: W. Genesee St., Skaneateles, New York
- Coordinates: 42°56′41″N 76°26′22″W
- Area: less than one acre
- Built: 1815
- Architect: Thompson, Peter; Billing, John
- Architectural style: Federal
- MPS: Freedom Trail, Abolitionism, and African American Life in Central New York MPS
- NRHP reference No.: 03000595
- Added to NRHP: July 3, 2003

The James and Lydia Canning Fuller House in Skaneateles, New York is a historic house, which on three occasions was used as part of the Underground Railway.

James Fuller married Lydia Charleton in 1815 in Bristol at the Friends Meeting House. This was the same year as the house was built.

James Canning Fuller was the secretary of the Skaneateles Anti-Slavery Society in 1838. He was a delegate to the World's Anti-Slavery Convention in 1840 in London.

The house was listed on the National Register of Historic Places in 2003.
