= Jay R. Hinckley =

American politician (1840–1914)

Jay Reed Hinckley (April 23, 1840 – March 25, 1914) was a member of the Wisconsin State Assembly.

== Biography ==
Hinckley was born on April 23, 1840; sources have differed on the location. He attended Whitestown Seminary. Later, his places of residence included the Wisconsin cities of River Falls, Hudson and Tomah. Hinckley's professions included schoolteacher, school principal and newspaper editor and publisher.

In 1868, Hinckley married Sarah A. Chamberlain. They had three children.

== Political career ==
Hinckley was a member of the Assembly in 1883, representing the 2nd District of Monroe County, Wisconsin. Previously, he had been the school superintendent of St. Croix County, Wisconsin in 1872 and 1878. He was a Democrat.
