= Simeon Jocelyn =

American minister, abolitionist and activist

Simeon Smith Jocelyn (1799 – 1879) was an American minister, abolitionist, engraver, and activist known for promoting educational opportunities and civil and political rights for African Americans in New Haven, Connecticut, during the 19th century. He is also known for his attempt to establish the United States' first college for African Americans in New Haven, and for his role in the Amistad affair.

== Abolitionism ==
Jocelyn served as the first pastor of the Black congregation at the new Temple Street Church in New Haven, Connecticut. A former student at Yale College, Jocelyn was also the leading advocate for the establishment of an African-American college in New Haven. At the time there was no such college in the country, or anywhere else in the English-speaking world. Save a few exceptional cases, no college accepted African Americans as students. A few years later, the short-lived Oneida Institute and the Oberlin Collegiate Institute, predecessor of Oberlin College, decided to accept African Americans. The short-lived New-York Central College was the first to accept, from its opening day, both African Americans and women.

== New Haven excitement ==
Working closely with both William Lloyd Garrison and Arthur Tappan, he introduced his plan to create an African-American college to the New Haven community on September 7, 1831. Tappan offered a subvention of $1,000, if the local whites would raise $9,000 and the Blacks $10,000. Unfortunately, this coincided with the news of Nat Turner's Rebellion of late August in Virginia—some newspapers put stories of the proposed college and the revolt side-by-side—heightening the fear of Blacks nationwide. Jocelyn's project was met with overwhelming opposition—the vote against it in New Haven was 700 to 4—and he eventually was forced to resign from his position as pastor of the African-American church. Jocelyn's plan was so controversial that his house was later attacked by a white mob. The mob also destroyed a black-owned hotel, a black-owned property, and Arthur Tappan's summer home. The Oneida Institute, replaced by the Oberlin Collegiate Institute, was the one college Blacks could attend. There was no college in the country just for African Americans until the black-owned Wilberforce University opened in Ohio in 1856.

Even still, these events did not prevent Jocelyn from continuing to work as a conductor of the Underground Railroad. In addition, Jocelyn also helped build a racially-integrated neighborhood in New Haven.

== Amistad affair ==
In 1839, several Cuban slave traders were transporting a group of 53 African captives to a Caribbean plantation. The Africans had been illegally abducted and traded by Portuguese slave hunters. En route to the Caribbean, the Africans rebelled against the captain of their ship and killed several of the kidnappers. The ship was eventually seized by the United States off the coast of Long Island, New York, and the Africans were imprisoned in New Haven. Although they were acquitted of murder, a controversy erupted over the Africans' status: were they free, according to U.S. law, which did not permit the importation of slaves? Or should they be forcibly transported back to their owners in the Spanish colony of Cuba?

This debate immediately attracted the attention of prominent abolitionists. Simeon Jocelyn founded the Amistad Committee with Lewis Tappan and Joshua Leavitt. The goals of the committee were to endorse the freedom of the Africans and to fund the Africans' legal and living expenses. With the help of Jocelyn, the Africans won the case, with the Supreme Court ruling that the United States government must allow the Africans to return to their homeland.

== Legacy ==
Jocelyn Square, in New Haven, is named for him.
