= Hinkley (surname) =

Hinkley is a surname. Notable people with the surname include:

- Aaron Hinkley (born 1999), English rugby union player
- Clayton Hinkley (born 1989), Australian rules footballer
- Daniel J. Hinkley, American horticulturist
- David V. Hinkley (1944–2019), American statistician
- George C. Hinkley (1862–1936), American businessman and politician
- Ken Hinkley (born 1966), Australian rules footballer and coach
- Leonard Hinkley (1839–1918), American politician in Wisconsin
- Tim Hinkley (born 1946), English musician
- Tommy Hinkley (born 1960), American actor
- Warren J. Hinkley (1870–1933), American politician

Fictional characters:

- Ralph Hinkley, character in the television series The Greatest American Hero
- Roy Hinkley, character in the television series Gilligan's Island

== See also ==
- Hinckley (surname)
