= Barbara Hinckley =

American political scientist

- Died: November 21, 1995
- Education: Mount Holyoke College; Cornell University
- Awards: Richard E. Neustadt Award, APSA; Guggenheim Fellowship
- Scientific career
- Fields: Political science
- Workplaces: University of Massachusetts Amherst; Cornell University; University of Wisconsin–Madison; New York University; Purdue University

Barbara Hinckley (died November 21, 1995) was an American political scientist. She was a scholar of the United States Congress and the American presidency. Her work included influential studies of the seniority system in the United States Congress, the rhetoric of American presidents, and the influence of polling on presidential decision-making. Hinckley was a professor of political science at a number of institutions, the last being Purdue University.

== Education and positions ==
Hinckley obtained her undergraduate degree at Mount Holyoke College, followed by a PhD from Cornell University, which she completed in 1968.

Hinckley worked at the University of Massachusetts Amherst, Cornell University, the University of Wisconsin–Madison, and New York University, before joining the Political Science Department at Purdue University in 1993.

== Research ==
Hinckley's research largely focused on the United States Congress, the American presidency, and American campaigns and elections. In 1971 she published the book The Seniority System in Congress, which has been called "the single classic" on the topics of seniority in the United States Senate and seniority in the United States House of Representatives. In 1990, Hinckley published The Symbolic Presidency: How Presidents Portray Themselves, one of the first books on presidential rhetoric and how historical American presidents had chosen to communicate. Hinckley's 1992 book Follow the Leader: Opinion Polls and the Modern Presidents, co-authored with Paul Brace, won the Richard E. Neustadt Award from the Presidency Section of the American Political Science Association for the best book on the presidency published in 1992.

In 1974, Hinckley won a Guggenheim Fellowship from the John Simon Guggenheim Memorial Foundation in the field of Political Science.

In addition to her research, Hinckley also engaged in public scholarship. For example, she appeared regularly on C-SPAN to provide expert commentary on American politics, polling, and campaigns. Barbara Hinckley also co-authored a book with her daughter, Karen Hinckley, called America's Best Sellers: A Reader's Guide to Popular Fiction, which was published in 1989. She died on November 21, 1995.

== Selected works ==
Hinckley's works included:

- The Seniority System in Congress (1971)
- Coalitions & politics (1981)
- America's Best Sellers: A Reader's Guide to Popular Fiction, with Karen Hinckley (1989)
- Follow the Leader: Opinion Polls and the Modern Presidents, with Paul Brace (1994)
- Congress, Less Than Meets the Eye: The Myth of Congressional Assertiveness in Foreign Policy (1994)

== Selected awards ==
- Richard E. Neustadt Award, with Paul Brace, American Political Science Association (1993)
- Guggenheim Fellowship (1974)
