= Manual labor college =

Type of American school (1825–1860)

A manual labor college was a type of school in the United States, primarily between 1825 and 1860, in which work, usually agricultural or mechanical, supplemented academic activity.

The manual labor model was intended to make educational opportunities more widely available to students with limited means, and to make the schools more viable economically. The work was seen as morally beneficial as well as healthful; at the time, this was innovative and egalitarian thinking.

The inventive power, which is a modification of the same principle [of suggestion], is greatly invigorated by that healthful energy of the circulation, which is produced by bodily exercise. ...The law of connection between the healthful, vigorous and locomotive powers of the muscular system, and the state of the affections and operations of the mind, has not yet been sufficiently investigated. Facts show its existence and importance.

According to the trustees of the Lane Seminary:

[I]t is to the directors no longer a matter of experiment, but of sober fact, resulting from three or four years experience, that the connexion of three hours daily labor in some useful and interesting employment, with study, protects the health and constitution of our young men; greatly augments their physical energy; furnishes to a considerable extent or entirely, the means of self-education; increases their power of intellectual acquisition; facilitates their actual progress in study; removes the temptation of idleness; confirms their habit of industry; gives them a practical acquaintance with the useful employments of life; fits them for the toils and responsabilities of a new-settled country; and inspires them with the independence of character, and the originality of investigation, which belong peculiarly to self-made and self-educated men.... At the close of the session the students, instead of feeling worn out by their efforts, exhibited as much intellectual and physical energy, and as great an elasticity as is usually found in literary institutions at the beginning of a term.

These "colleges" usually included what we would today (2019) call high school ("preparatory") as well as college-level instruction. At the time, the only public schools were at the elementary level, and there were no rules distinguishing colleges from high schools.

The four states with the largest number of such schools were New York, Ohio, Indiana, and Illinois.

== George W. Gale ==
George W. Gale was the founder of the first and best-known American example, the Oneida Institute of Science and Industry, and he thought the concept was his, although there are European predecessors. He and many of the other pious Yankees were persuaded that manual labor was to be the central practical feature of the coming American, Christian program of education. In 1830 Gale wrote: "Depend on it, Brother Finney, none of us have estimated the importance of this System of Education. It will be to the moral world what the lever of Archimedes, could he have found a fulcrum, would have been to the natural." As he put it slightly later, in his circular and plan for Knox College, "the manual labor system, if properly sustained and conducted, ...is peculiarly adapted...to qualify men for the self-denying and arduous duties of the gospel ministry, especially in our new settlements and missionary fields abroad."

== Theodore Weld and the Society for Promoting Manual Labor in Literary Institutions ==
Theodore Dwight Weld had studied under Gale for three years, and was convinced of the wisdom of the manual labor movement, which he recommended unsuccessfully to Hamilton College. He was a highly successful young lecturer on temperance, and caught the attention of the philanthropist Tappan brothers, Arthur and Lewis. They invited him to New York and tried to get him to accept an appointment as minister, but he declined, saying he was not prepared. Since he was "a living, breathing, and eloquently-speaking exhibit of the results of manual-labor-with-study," the brothers, trying to support and encourage him, hired him for a year as an agent of the manual labor movement. For the purpose they created in 1831 a Society for Promoting Manual Labor in Literary Institutions, "literary institutions" being non-theological schools, as in "In every literary institution there are a number of hours daily, in which nothing is required of the student." The only known activities of the Society were hiring Weld for the year 1832, hosting him as speaker, and publishing his report.

According to its constitution, it was "the object of this society to collect and diffuse information, calculated to promote the establishment and prosperity of manual labor schools and seminaries in the United States, and to introduce the system of manual labor into institutions now established." The Society's charge to Weld is lost, but to judge from his 100-page, carefully organized report, he was charged with traveling and investigating manual labor education as it then existed, and making suggestions for its improvement and prosperity. "We wish you to keep a minute and accurate journal of your tour, embracing all the facts which you collect, with such remarks and inferences as you may think proper." He was also "to ascertain to what extent the manual labor system was suited to conditions in the West" (the Ohio valley). He was "to find a site for a great national manual labor institution where training for the western ministry could be provided for poor but earnest young men who had dedicated their lives to the home missionary cause in the 'vast valley of the Mississippi.'"

In Weld's January, 1833, report to the Society he stated that "In prosecuting the business of my agency, I have traveled during the year four thousand five hundred and seventy-five miles miles [7,364 km]; in public conveyances [boat and stagecoach], 2,630 [4,230 km]; on horseback, 1,800 [2,900 km]; on foot, 145 [233 km]. I have made two hundred and thirty-six public addresses." A newspaper published a summary of his report:

He endeavors to show, in the first place, that the present system of education makes fearful havoc of health and life — that it effeminates the mind — that it is perilous to morals — that it produces an indisposition to effort, and destroys habits of activity and industry — and that it is so expensive that its practical effects are antirepublican. From these premises he derives the conclusions — 1st, That bodily exercise is indispensable to man, demanded alike by the necessities of his corporeal, intellectual, and moral nature, his individual happiness and social usefulness: and 2d, this exercise should be incorporated into our systems of education and alternated with study in all seminaries of learning. He next considers the arrangements of time for this exercise, the amount to be taken, and the kind of exercise best adapted to accomplish all the objects desired. He points out the objections to some of the more common modes of exercise, and then proceeds to show the benefits of the Manual Labor System, as furnishing exercise natural to man, and adapted to interest the mind — as peculiarly happy in its moral effects, furnishing the student with important practical acquisitions; promoting habits of industry, independence and originality of character; rendering permanent all the manlier features of character; affording facilities to the student in acquiring a knowledge of human nature; greatly diminishing the expense of education; increasing the wealth of the country; tending to do away [with] those absurd distinctions in sociely which make the occupation of an individual the standard of his worth; and finally, as having a tendency to render permanent our republican institutions. The objections commonly urged against the system are examined and answered; and the obstacles which at present retard its progress and success are pointed out. The reasoning and suggestions of Mr. Weld on the various topics embraced in his report, are forcible and full of interest. In support of his different positions he has introduced a great number of extracts containing the views and sentiments of the most distinguished physicians and litarary men connected with public institutions, whoso experience nnd opportunities for observation give great weight to their testimony. The whole pamphlet embodies a mass of facts and information of great value and interest, and cannot fail, we think, to be instrumental in diffusing more correct and enlightened views on the important subject on which it treats.

Weld recommended Cincinnati, which he visited twice, as "the logical location [for the new school]. Cincinnati was the focal center of population and commerce in the Ohio valley." The new and barely-functioning Lane Seminary in Walnut Hills, Ohio, near Cincinnati, was coincidentally looking for students. On Weld's recommendation, the Tappans chose it as the site for a national institution. See Lane Theological Seminary for more on it. With Weld very much at the head of it, the first national debate on slavery in the United States was held there, followed by the first organized student movement; students resigned en masse, many going to the new Oberlin Collegiate Institute.

== The need for a New England school ==
The New Hampshire Anti-Slavery Society, at its first convention, in 1834, passed a resolution expressing its support for the New England Anti-Slavery Society's resolution calling for a manual labor school "in some most eligible portion of New England", to address "the general want of mental cultivation of the colored population of our country".

== The failure of manual labor in colleges ==
Although a variety of colleges incorporated manual labor to some degree, in most cases it was abandoned after only a few years, and it was all but gone by 1850. According to Herbert Lull, the reasons for its failure are:

1. Labor was treated as a source of revenue, to support unrelated college activities.
2. The labor was not linked in any way to the students' educational or career goals. Agricultural labor, for example, was of little relevance to the student preparing for a pulpit.
3. The work became drudgery. Students wanted some leisure, some play.
4. The work did not fulfill the financial expectations colleges had of it.

As summarized by Geoffrey Blodgett in his analysis of its quick disappearance at Oberlin:

It proved unworkable in both economic and educational terms. Student labor was simply too expensive and inefficient. It cost more to raise crops than it did to buy produce from local farmers. Furthermore, however beautiful in theory the idea of integrating learning and labor, in practice the two did not reinforce each other, but rather competed, to their mutual disadvantage. ..."They rested on their hoes in the cornfield to look into their inner consciousnesses, and the manual labor cause suffered in the interests of philosophy."

However, "the 'manual labor' movement waxed and waned in the 1830s, but in one form or another, its ideas never died." It is a predecessor of the land-grant university, a generation later. In 1917, Oberlin graduate L. L. Nunn founded Deep Springs College, which still today incorporates a version of the manual labor model into its governing philosophy.

== Selected list of manual labor schools ==
- Albany Manual Labor Academy, Albany, Ohio, 1850–1862. (See African American education in Albany.)
- Maine Wesleyan Seminary, which opened in 1825, the earliest example in the U.S.
- Manual Labor Academy of Pennsylvania, Germantown, Philadelphia, Pennsylvania
- Peterboro Manual Labor School "for young men of color" (1834–1836), in Peterboro, New York, created and funded by philanthropist Gerrit Smith A letter recommending a student has been published.
- Union Literary Institute, Randolph County, Indiana, which accepted students of any race and was called "a nigger school"
- Virginia Baptist Seminary, now the University of Richmond, 1832-1833
- Western Reserve Academy, Hudson, Ohio
- Western Scientific and Agricultural College
- Woodstock Manual Labor Institute, Woodstock, Michigan, 1844–1850s

A considerable list of other manual labor schools, is found in Richard Gause Boone's book A History of Education in Indiana. Boone calls the manual labor movement a 'craze' that soon ran its course.

== See also ==
- List of industrial schools
- Cooperative education
- Federal Work-Study Program
- Land-grant university
- Work college
- Work-study
