= Edmund Hinkly =

English cricketer (1817–1880)

Edmund Hinkly (12 January 1817 – 8 December 1880) was an English professional cricketer, most notable for being the first man known to have taken all ten wickets in a first-class cricket innings in an eleven-a-side game. He achieved this while playing for Kent County Cricket Club against an England XI at Lord's in 1848.

== Career ==
Hinkly was born at Benenden in Kent in 1817. He made his first-class cricket debut for Kent against Surrey at The Oval in 1846, going on to play in 43 known first-class matches between then and 1858. He was a professional player for Northumberland in 1862 and, as well as playing for them and Kent, played two matches for Surrey and appeared four times for England in matches against counties, twice for South of England and once for "Surrey Club". He stood as an umpire for the Surrey v Kent match at The Oval in 1852. He played for a number of clubs in different parts of the country as a professional.

The most notable incident of his career was taking all ten wickets in an innings for Kent in 1848, the first time that the feat of taking all ten wickets had been recorded. His exact bowling analysis is unknown as runs conceded were not recorded. (Note: Note that surviving match records in the 19th century are not always complete and any statistical compilation of a player's career in that period is based on known data. Match scorecards were not always created, or have been lost, and the matches themselves were not always recorded in the press or other media. Scorecard data was not comprehensive: e.g., bowling analyses lacked balls bowled and runs conceded; bowlers were not credited with wickets when the batsman was caught or stumped; in many matches, the means of dismissal were omitted.)

He died at Walworth, London in 1880 aged 63.

== Bibliography ==
- Carlaw, Derek (2020). Kent County Cricketers, A to Z: Part One (1806–1914) (PDF). Cardiff: ACS.
