= Amos Dresser =

American Christian abolitionist & pacifist

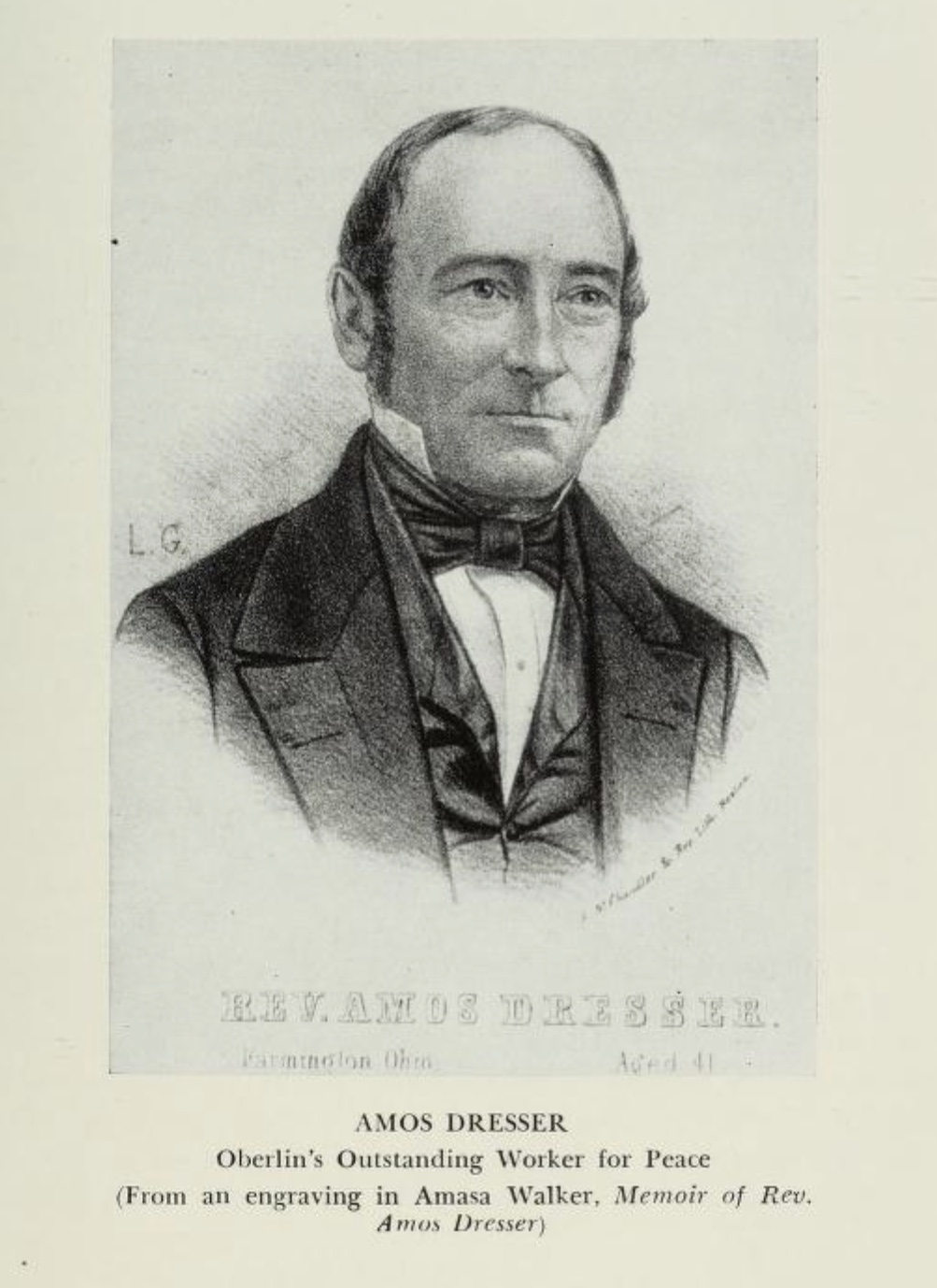
- Born: December 17, 1812; Peru, Massachusetts
- Died: February 4, 1904 (aged 91); Lawrence, Kansas
- Education: Oneida Institute, Lane Theological Seminary, Oberlin Collegiate Institute
- Occupations: Minister, missionary, abolitionist activist (paid), abolition and temperance lecturer.
- Known for: Public whipping for possessing abolitionist publications

Amos Dresser (December 17, 1812 – February 4, 1904) was an abolitionist and pacifist minister who was one of the founders of Olivet College. His name was well known in the Antebellum period due to a well-publicized incident: in 1835 he was arrested, tried, convicted, and publicly whipped in Nashville, Tennessee for the crime of possession of abolitionist publications. The incident was widely reported and became well known. Dresser published an account of it, and spoke of it frequently.

== Amos Dresser's early life ==
Dresser was born in Peru, Massachusetts, and was a descendant of Robert Cushman, a Mayflower pilgrim. His father died when he was an infant; he lived with his mother, Minerva Cushman, and his mother's second husband, Henry Pierce, until his mother’s death in 1826, when Amos was 13. "He was for a time engaged in a store; he then taught a school." To prepare for the ministry, in 1830 he enrolled in the new Oneida Institute of Science and Industry, a manual labor school near Utica, New York, predecessor of Oberlin, and briefly the most abolitionist school in the country.

He was one of the first to join a group, led by Theodore Weld, that left Oneida, eventually enrolling as students at the new Lane Seminary near Cincinnati, Ohio. This was the first organized student activism in the country. Dresser was active in the initiative among the group to teach Negroes in Cincinnati. He remained part of the Weld group, now called the Lane Rebels, when it withdrew en masse in 1834 after Lane prohibited student discussion of slavery. However, unlike others at the time, he did not enroll immediately in the Oberlin Collegiate Institute, as it was called until 1866.

== The whipping in Nashville ==
During the summer of 1835, in order to raise money to further his education, Dresser traveled around the South selling the Cottage Bible. In Nashville, Tennessee, by unfortunate accident he was discovered to have abolitionist literature with him. He was taken before an extra-legal vigilance committee of sixty prominent citizens. Dresser openly denounced the kangaroo court and the institution of slavery altogether. From his "papers, pamphlets, correspondence and statements", the self-appointed Committee found him guilty of:

1. Being an "active member" of an anti-slavery society in Ohio.
2. Having in his possession "sundry pamphlets of a most violent and pernicious tendency, and which if generally disseminated, would in all human possibility, cause an insurrection or rebellion among the slaves."
3. "That he published and exposed to public view the said pamphlets."

A newspaper reporting the case commented editorially that Dresser's crime "might possibly lead to the violation by blacks of our wives and daughters". He was sentenced to "twenty stripes on his bare back", which were carried out in public. The Committee claimed that were it not for them, he would have been lynched. Dresser then hurriedly left Nashville, without his luggage and horse, which he never recovered, although "I have frequently written to my friends concerning them."

The Nashville Republican published a special issue on the incident.

Dresser published in the Cincinnati Daily Gazette the story of what had happened to him, twice had it reprinted in pamphlets, plus the American Anti-Slavery Society issued it the following year, accompanied by other testimony on slavery. He later spoke of it many times, in the course of abolitionist lectures. In January 1837, he spoke on it to the Massachusetts Anti-Slavery Society, forced to meet in the hay-loft of a barn. Descriptions in Southern newspapers support his account, although they call the Bible-selling a sham obscuring what according to them was his alleged real purpose: distributing abolitionist literature and fomenting a slave insurrection.

In 1836, he became a successful lecturer for the American Anti-Slavery Society. He worked for abolitionist leader Henry B. Stanton in Worcester County, Massachusetts, lecturing at Athol, Massachusetts, Ashburn, and Slatersville, Rhode Island. He then went to Berkshire County, Massachusetts, and in 1839 to Jamaica to assist another Lane Rebel, David Ingraham, in missionary work among the "Negroes".

== Dresser's later life ==
Dresser returned to Ohio and, along with other Lane Rebels, enrolled at the Oberlin Collegiate Institute, where he obtained a degree in 1839. While a student at Oberlin he supported himself by working for the American Anti-Slavery Society as a lecturer. After completing his studies, he married Adeline Smith, a former Oberlin student, and from 1839 to 1841 they were missionaries in Jamaica. Among their children was Amos Dresser Jr.

For two years they lived in Batavia, Ohio, where he was pastor of two churches. From 1843 to 1846 he taught at the Olivet Institution in Olivet, Michigan, founded by Oberlin graduates. He then worked for Elihu Burritt and the League of Universal Brotherhood. In 1849 he published The Bible Against War.

His wife died in 1850, and in 1851 he married another former Oberlin student, Ann Jane Gray; Adeline Minerva Dresser was their daughter. They toured Europe, where Dresser gave lectures on temperance and abolition. When they returned to the United States, they settled in Farmington, Ohio, where Dresser worked as a pastor.

He served as minister of the Cranston Memorial Presbyterian Church in New Harmony, Indiana. From 1852 to 1865 Dresser was pastor of churches in Trumbull and Ashtabula Counties, Ohio, in the Western Reserve, Underground Railroad center and the most anti-slavery region of the country. From 1865 to 1869 he was pastor of three churches in Oceana County, Michigan. In 1869 he went to Butler County, Nebraska, where he had the “whole county for a parish.” In 1879 he went to Red Willow County, Nebraska. At some point towards the end of his life Dresser and his wife went to live in Lawrence, Kansas, with one of their children, and both Amos and Ann Jane died there.

=== Writings ===
- Dresser, Amos (August 25, 1835). "The Narrative of Amos Dresser". Cincinnati Gazette. The date is that on Dresser's letter, not the date of the newspaper.
  - Dresser, Amos (September 17, 1835). "Amos Dresser's Case [first page]". Evening Post (New York). p. 1 – via newspapers.com.
  - Dresser, Amos (September 17, 1835). "Amos Dresser's Case [concluding page]". Evening Post (New York). p. 2 – via newspapers.com.
  - Dresser, Amos (September 26, 1835). "Amos Dresser's Own Narrative". The Liberator. p. 4 – via newspapers.com.
  - Dresser, Amos (c. 1835). Narrative. "[By the request of many of my friends, I re-publish the following narrative of my "Nashville experience".]" Link is to a reprinting in the collection Slave Rebels, Abolitionists, and Southern Courts. The Lawbook Exchange. ISBN 9781584777441.
  - Dresser, Amos (c. 1835). Amos Dresser's Narrative.
  - Dresser, Amos (1836). The narrative of Amos Dresser : with Stone's letters from Natchez, an obituary notice of the writer, and two letters from Tallahassee, relating to the treatment of slaves. Link is to a reprinting in the collection Slave Rebels, Abolitionists, and Southern Courts. New-York: American Anti-Slavery Society.
  - Dresser, Amos (1883). "Narrative of Personal Experience". In Ballantine, W. G. (ed.). The Oberlin Jubilee 1833–1883. Oberlin, Ohio: E. J. Goodrich. pp. 236–250.
- Dresser, Amos (1846). The Bible Against War. Oberlin, Ohio: The author. Extensive excerpts were reprinted in The Liberator on March 1, March 29, and April 5, 1850. They received a lengthy response in a letter published in The Liberator on April 26. He spoke on this topic to the Ashtabula (Ohio) Bible Society in 1858.
