= Moses N. Adams =

American missionary and educator (1822–1902)

The Reverend Moses N. Adams
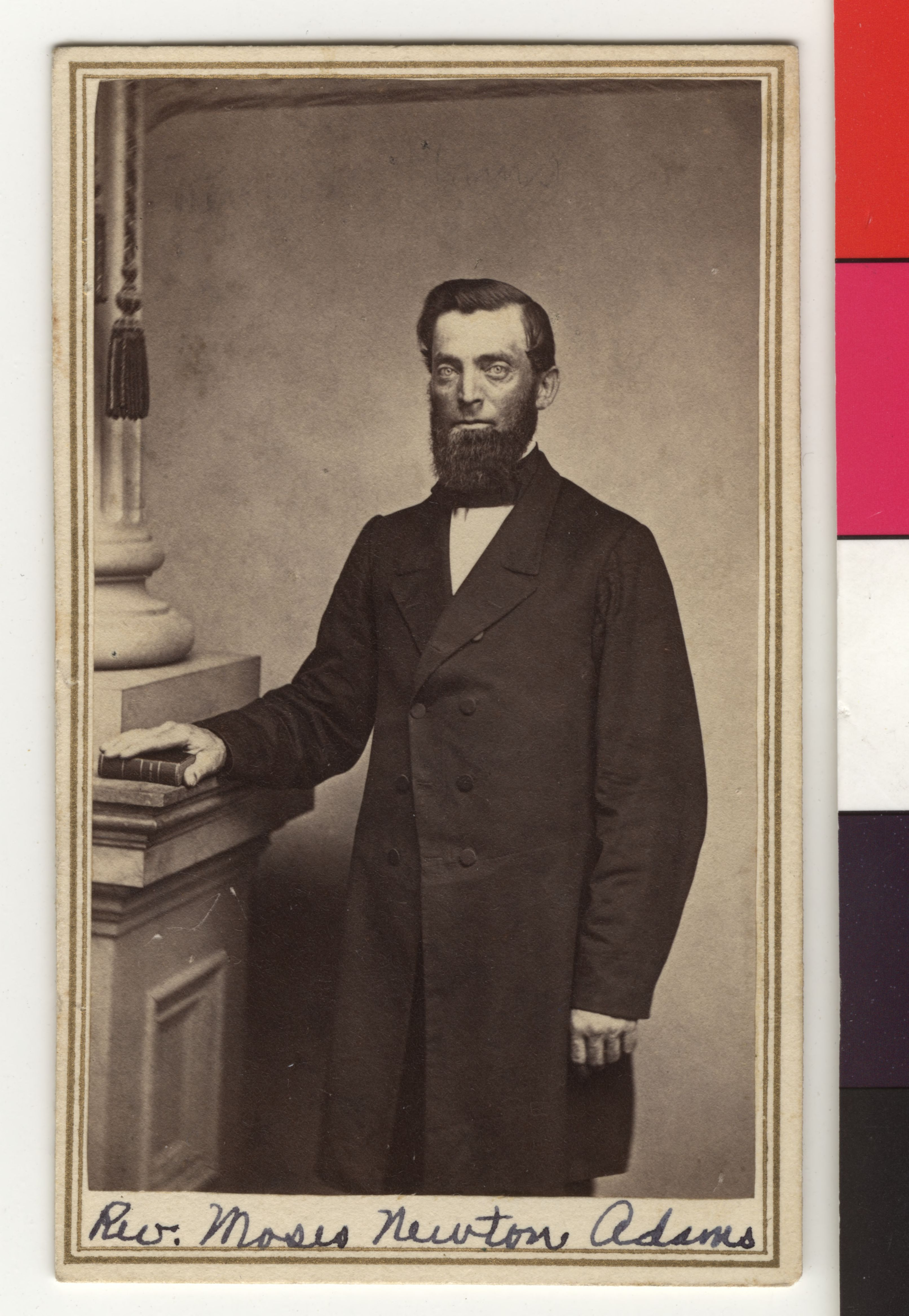
- Portrait of Adams by Joel Emmons Whitney
- Church: Presbyterian Church in America

Orders
- Ordination: June 14, 1848

Personal details
- Born: Moses Newton Adams; February 14, 1822 Rockville, Ohio, U.S.
- Died: July 23, 1902 (aged 80) Buffalo, New York, U.S.
- Buried: Oakland Cemetery; Saint Paul, Minnesota, U.S.
- Denomination: Presbyterian
- Occupation: Missionary, educator, Indian agent
- Education: Ripley College; Lane Seminary

Moses Newton Adams (February 14, 1822 – July 23, 1902) was an American missionary, Indian agent, military chaplain, and educator. During his career Adams was instrumental in missionary work and education at Kaposia and later the Lac qui Parle Mission including translating texts into the Dakota language. Adams is noted by the Minnesota Historical Society as being one of the first producers of a Dakota/English lexicon.

== Early life and education ==
Adams was born on February 14, 1822, in Rockville, Ohio where he attended common school, Adams was later educated at the Ripley College in Ripley, Ohio from 1839 to 1845 and the Lane Seminary in Cincinnati from 1845 to 1848. While at the Lane Seminary Adams was a classmate of Henry Ward Beecher. Adams was ordained on June 14, 1848, by the Presbytery of Cincinnati and was immediately appointed by the church to assist fellow missionary Stephen Return Riggs in ministering to the Dakota people in Minnesota Territory.

== Missionary career ==
Beginning in 1848 Adams moved to Minnesota Territory with his wife and began his career as a missionary for the Dakota people. According to the Minnesota Historical Society Adams briefly taught and lived at the village of Kaposia until the autumn of 1848 when he relocated to the Lac qui Parle Mission station alongside Stephen Riggs. While at Lac qui Parle Adams was the head of a day school and produced a lexicon in both the Dakota and English languages for ease of translating. Adams would work at the Lac qui Parle Mission for a total of five years before moving to Traverse des Sioux in 1853 to work as a local pastor.

During the Dakota War of 1862 Adams assisted civilians in seeking refuge at St. Peter, Minnesota who had fled the attack at the Lower Sioux Agency, the Battle of Fort Ridgely, and the Battles of New Ulm. Adams was also responsible for carrying militia orders from Minnesota Governor Alexander Ramsey from St. Peter to Mankato, Minnesota during the conflict. Adams later accompanied Captain Hiram P. Grant and the 6th Minnesota Infantry Regiment as a civilian member of the burial party which was later involved in the Battle of Birch Coulee. Adams was not involved in the battle as he and the rest of the civilians had returned to Fort Ridgely.

== Later career ==
Adams was later employed as an Indian agent under the Ulysses S. Grant administration to replace Jared W. Daniels as the agent for the Sisseton Wahpeton Oyate at the Lake Traverse Indian Reservation from 1871 to 1875. Adams was also appointed by the American Board of Commissioners for Foreign Missions to be the head of the Goodwill Mission at Lake Traverse Adams which had been started by Adam's colleague Stephen Riggs in 1870. During this time Adams also worked as a military chaplain at various posts.

While at the Lake Traverse Reservation Adams came into a heated dispute with Dakota Chief Ti'Wakan (also called Gabriel Renville), over the practice polygamy which was practiced by the Dakota at the time. Adams also proposed to the Dakota that they set aside many of their traditional practices in order to conform to Western society and be assimilated, these unfounded "laws" proposed by Adams were rejected. These "laws" passed by Adams created two major factions at the Lake Traverse Reservation, the so-called "Scout" faction under Ti'Wakan, and the so-called "church" faction under Adams. Ti'Wakan and others eventually wrote a letter to Samuel J. Brown, the son of Joseph R. Brown, as well as Henry Hastings Sibley and Henry Benjamin Whipple detailing their frustrations with Adams and requested the ability to choose their own agent to administrate the reservation. Adams was eventually relieved of his duties as Indian agent on May 1, 1875.

Adams eventually retired from missionary work altogether in 1892, Adams died on July 23, 1902, in Buffalo, New York and is buried in Oakland Cemetery in Saint Paul, Minnesota.
