= Clarence Dickinson =

American composer and organist

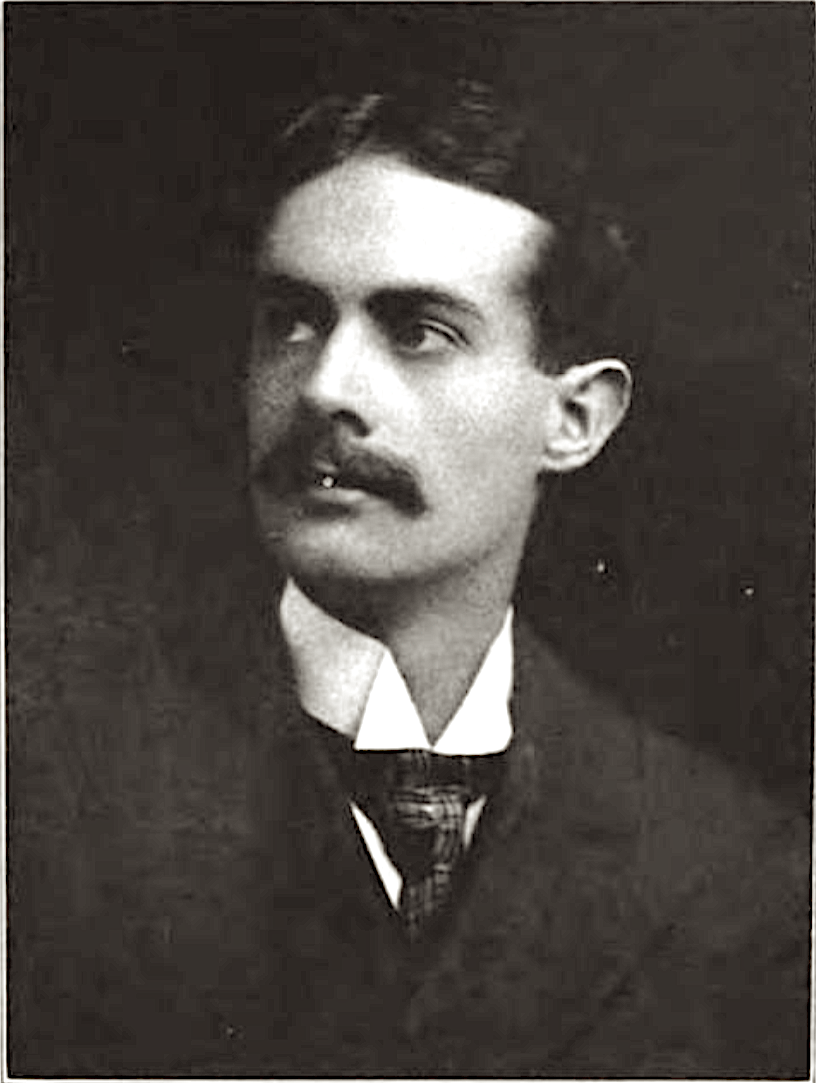
Clarence Dickinson in 1908.

Clarence Dickinson (May 7, 1873 in Lafayette, Indiana – August 2, 1969 in New York City) was an American composer and organist.

== Early life and studies ==
Dickinson grew up in a religious family. His grandfather was minister Baxter Dickinson. His father, the Rev. William Cowper Dickinson, had grown up at Lane Seminary while Baxter Dickinson was codirector with Lyman Beecher; his father's childhood playmates were Lyman's children Henry Ward Beecher and Harriet Beecher. He was sixth cousin to poet Emily Dickinson, who corresponded with his father and sister.

When Dickinson was born, his father was pastor of the Second Presbyterian Church in Lafayette. They later moved to Cincinnati, where Dickinson had his first hands-on experience playing the organ, and began studying piano. When his father retired in 1887, the family briefly moved to Pasadena, California.

In the fall of 1888 Dickinson enrolled for a year at the preparatory school at Miami University, living in the same room that Benjamin Harrison (who that fall had been elected president) had occupied while he was a student. That year, at age 15, he had his first professional appointment as University Organist.

The next year, he joined his family in Evanston, Illinois, and enrolled at Northwestern University, initially studying classics. But at the same time he became organist of First Methodist Church in Evanston for two years, and took lessons with Professor Cutler, organist of Evanston's First Methodist Church (where Dickinson would later briefly become organist). He gave his first organ concert at First Methodist.

In 1892 he became organist for Chicago's Church of the Messiah, which had just installed a new Roosevelt organ. Here he played for 5 years, his stature growing thanks to media attention from Clarence Eddy and Wilhelm Middelschulte about his having given the first American organ concert from memory. This led to him being asked to be the youngest founding member of the American Guild of Organists. He then became organist of St. James Episcopal Church in Chicago for one year.

He gained the attention and patronage of Mrs. Proctor Smith, a soprano trained in the European tradition. She loaned him $3000 for the purposes of advanced study in Europe. In 1898 he traveled to western Europe to pursue graduate studies (at the time there were no musical graduate degrees offered in the United States). His first studies were with Heinrich Reimann in Berlin, who only took one student per year (except for the year that Dickinson was there; concert pianist Olga Samaroff also studied organ with Reimann). He also studied with Otto Singer. While in Berlin he was exposed to the musical luminaries of the day, including Felix Weingartner, Arthur Nikisch, Karl Muck, Richard Strauss, Siegfried Ochs, Busoni, and Josef Hoffman. He was a guest of the American ambassador to Germany Andrew White.

After his studies with Reimann completed, in the summer of 1899 he vacationed in Switzerland. On this trip he met Helen Adell Snyder (1875–1957) who was on her way to Heidelberg to study for her doctorate. Within 3 days they were engaged.

In the fall of 1899 he moved to Paris to further his studies. He intended to study with Widor, but ended studying with Alexandre Guilmant for two years. The first year he also studied composition with Moszkowski, and the second year with Louis Vierne. Here he wrote his first organ composition, Berceuse, dedicated to his fiancée Snyder. During this time he was organist at the American Cathedral in Paris.

== Career ==
In 1901 he returned to the United States, throwing himself into professional music in the Chicago area. For the first year he was the choir director at the McVicker's Theater in Chicago. The next year he was director of music at Evanston's First Methodist Church. Six months later he was again appointed organist-choirmaster at St. James Episcopal Church in Chicago. At the same time he was also offered the post of conductor of the Musical Club at Columbia Conservatory in Aurora, Illinois, taught in Dubuque Iowa, and taught at the Cosmopolitan School that he directed in Chicago. It required criss-crossing Illinois nearly daily by train. There were further engagements the English Opera Company, the Sunday Evening Club chorus, and the Temple Kehilath Anshe Mayriv.

In 1904 he married Helen Adell Snyder after a five-year engagement. They honeymooned in Europe, touring Cadiz, Tangier, and Cordova, and on this trip they began collecting folk songs together.

Dickinson started the Musical Art Society of Chicago in 1906, which brought together Chicago's best singers on a volunteer basis to present choral concerts in Chicago. Many of these singers commuted to New York, and spread the word of Dickinson's successes. This led to him accepting an invitation to succeed Archer Gibson as organist and choirmaster at Brick Presbyterian Church in New York, a post which he held for 50 years.

He joined the faculty of Union Theological Seminary in 1912, where he remained until his retirement in 1945; he founded the institution's School for Sacred Music there in 1928. This school offered the first graduate degrees in sacred music in the United States.

He suffered a heart attack in 1955. His wife Helen died in 1957. He remarried in 1963 to Lois Stice at Brick Presbyterian.

He played regularly at the World's Fairs, starting with Chicago in 1893 through Montreal's in 1967.

He and his first wife co-wrote a large amount of sacred music, as well as a general-audience music appreciation book titled Excursions in Musical History. While he composed large-scale pieces, including at least one organ symphony, he was better known as an arranger and pedagogue; his 1922 publication The Technique and Art of Organ Playing is a standard reference work which went through several editions in his lifetime, and he edited a general-use hymnal for the Presbyterian Church in the United States of America in 1933. Late in life he and his wife collaborated on an edition of anthems written by early Moravian settlers in the United States.

== Legacy ==
A music festival in honor of Clarence Dickinson and in memory of his wife Helen Dickinson was held on April 27, 1958, in New York's Riverside Church. Many choirs, conductors, organists, and soloists participated, among them Virgil Fox and Leo Sowerby. Sowerby's organ work Eternal Light was written for the occasion and given its premiere by Dickinson. At this festival he was given the sobriquet the Dean of American Church Music.

The Journal of Church Music dedicated its October 1969 issue as a memorial to Dickinson.

His widow Lois donated his archives to William Carey College. After Lois' death in 1972, her sisters gifted the entire contents of Dickinson's study to the college. The collection includes a desk that once belonged to his cousin Emily Dickinson, one of the rare surviving copies of Jeremiah Ingalls' A Songster's Companion, and correspondence with musical and church figures of his day. The college named the Clarence Dickinson Memorial Library of Church Music in his honor.

The American Guild of Organists named the Clarence Dickinson Society, its legacy and planned giving program, in his honor.

Sculptor Paul Fjelde created a portrait of Dickinson in 1959.

Several works are dedicated to Dickinson, including:

- The Vanderpoel Compositions, a set of songs for voice and piano by Chicagoan Kate Vanderpoel, transcribed for organ and published by Orpheus Publication Co. in Chicago in 1898 (one of which was dedicated to Dickinson).
- Dithyramb by Clarence Lucas; Dickinson premiered it in 1911 at the dedication concert of the new Skinner organ at St. John the Divine.
- Victor Herbert's arrangement for male chorus of The Cruiskeen Lawn (dedicated to Dickinson and the Mendelssohn Glee Club of New York)
- In Springtime (published 1918) for organ by Lucien Gates Chaffin
- March in D minor (published 1923, op. 76a) for organ by René Louis Becker
- Christmas Cradle Song (1928) for organ by Alfrēds Kalniņš, a Latvian organist and composer who lived in New York from 1927 to 1933
