= Clarence Lucas =

Canadian composer and conductor (1866–1947)

Clarence Lucas (October 19, 1866 – July 2, 1947), was a Canadian composer, lyricist, conductor, and music professor.

Lucas was born at Six Nations Reserve, Ontario and was a student of Romain-Octave Pelletier I. He taught at the Toronto College of Music, taught in Utica, New York, and was the musical director at Wesleyan Ladies College in Hamilton, Ontario. In London, he tutored pupils in composition, proofread music for Chappel publishing, and was a correspondent and then editor for the magazine Musical Courier which he later held in New York and Paris. In Sèvres, just outside Paris, Lucas freelanced as a music transcriber, arranger, lyricist, and translator. He also contributed to Etude, a musical periodical.

Lucas conducted works by George Frideric Handel, Michael Costa, Edvard Grieg, George M. Cohan, and others. He toured the British Isles as a conductor for the Irish musical Peggy Machree, and the United States for Grieg's Peer Gynt.

Lucas' first wife was the English pianist Clara Asher (who had studied with Clara Schumann) and their son was the British composer and conductor Leighton Lucas (1903 - 1982). She died in 1942. His second wife was Gertrude Pidd, a musician.

In the early 1900s, Lucas composed Overture Macbeth, a piece inspired by the Shakespeare play. The work had not been performed for nearly 100 years, until July 2018, where the music was orchestrated and recorded by the Symphonova Orchestra, to mark the Canadian sesquicentennial. Overture Macbeth can be found on the collection La Patrie - Our Canada, distributed by the Canadian Music Centre.

He authored The Story of Musical Form (1908, London).

Lucas composed music for voice, choir, organ, piano and orchestra. He wrote overtures, cantatas, symphonies, operas, chamber music, songs for musicals, lyrics for popular songs and art songs.

He died July 2, 1947, in Paris and is buried in Sèvres.

His notable works include:

- The Money Spider (opera, c. 1897)
- Overture for Shakespeare's As You Like It, (1899)
- Overture for Shakespeare's Macbeth, (1900)
- Overture for Shakespeare's Othello
- Prelude and Fugue, Opus 38
- The Birth of Christ (cantata, 1901)
- Peggy Machree (musical, 1904)
- Dithyramb, for organ, dedicated to Clarence Dickinson
- The Song of Songs (lyrics, 1914)
- The Perfect Song (lyrics)
