= James Bradley (former slave) =

African slave & activist (c.1810–c.1837)

- Born: c. 1810; Guinea, Africa
- Died: Known to be alive in 1837.
- Occupations: Freedman (former slave); planned to study for ministry
- Years active: 1833—1837
- Known for: Participating in Lane Seminary's 1834 debates on slavery

James Bradley (c. 1810 – after 1837) was an African slave in the United States who purchased his freedom and became an anti-slavery activist in Ohio.

Bradley was two or three years old when he was enslaved and transported to the United States, where he was purchased by a Mr. Bradley of Pendleton County, Kentucky; he subsequently moved with the Bradley family to the Arkansas Territory. While working days as a slave, Bradley began to work for himself through the night. In 1833, after eight years, he purchased his freedom and went to Cincinnati in the free state of Ohio.

Bradley associated himself with Lane Seminary and played a central role in the Lane Debates on Slavery in 1834. As the result of Bradley's moving speech, students rallied to organize educational opportunities for blacks and sought to integrate with the community. The Board of Trustees of the Seminary then shut down anti-slavery activity, which resulted in at least forty people, known as the Lane Rebels, leaving as a group. Oberlin, Ohio, was the beneficiary; it became a racially diverse community and a center for anti-slavery efforts. Bradley moved to Oberlin with the other Rebels. He studied for a year in an affiliated preparatory school of Oberlin College, the Sheffield Manual Labor Institute.

Bradley wrote an autobiographical statement that provides much of information that is known about his time of slavery and escape. Nothing is known of his life after 1837. There is no known image of or physical description of him.

== Slavery ==
=== Childhood ===
According to Bradley, he lived in Guinea, a region of west Africa, when he was captured as a two- or three-year-old child. He later said of the experience, "the soul-destroyers tore me from my mother's arms." He was taken on a long overland journey before being put on board a ship bound for America. The ship was full of chained adult African men and women, but he was allowed free run of the deck because he was too small to be chained. He was brought to America illegally, since the legal importation of slaves ended in 1808.

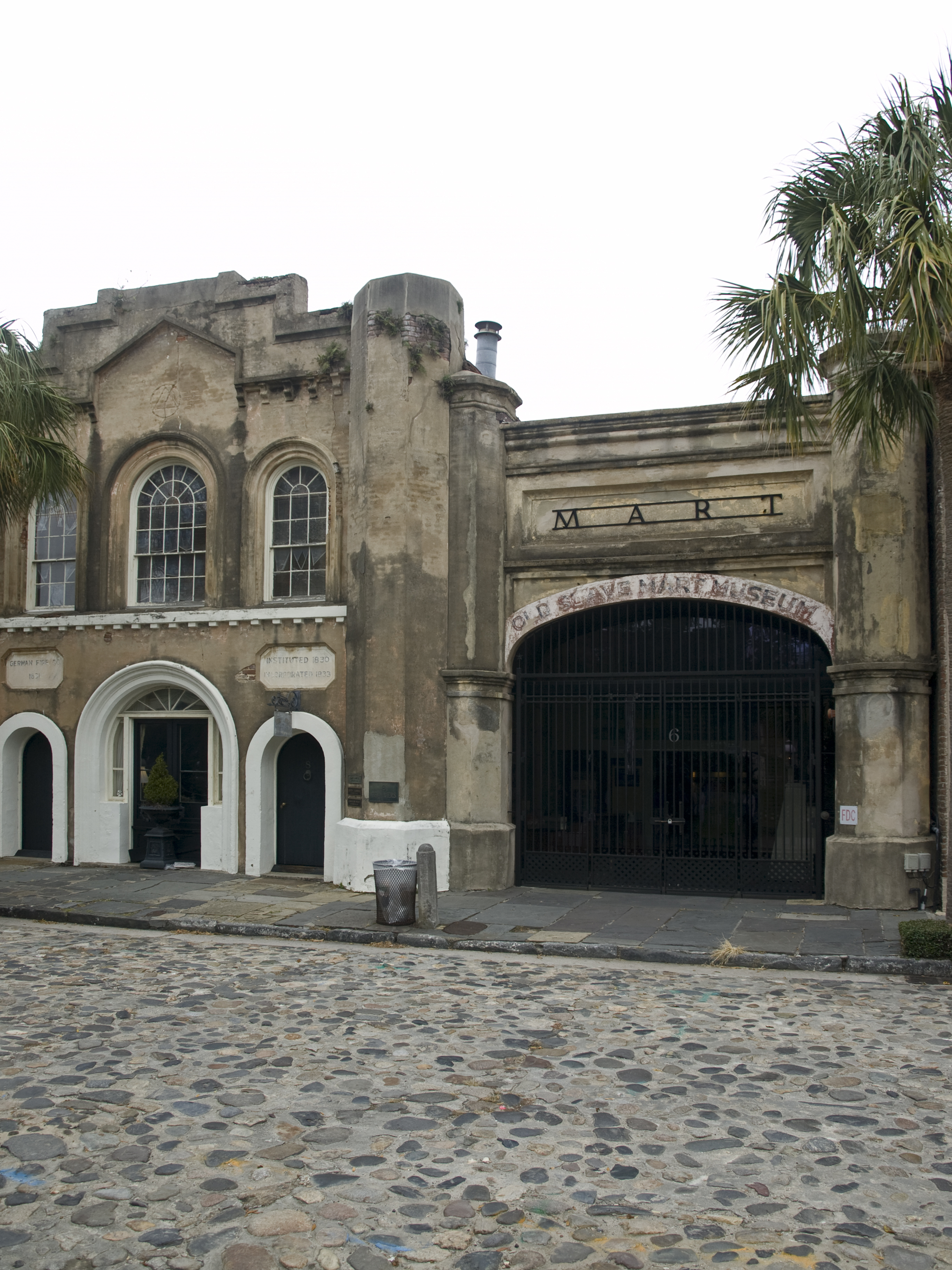
The Old Slave Mart, Charleston, South Carolina

After his arrival at the port of Charleston, South Carolina, he was purchased by a slaveholder, brought to Pendleton County, Kentucky and sold about six months later to a man named Bradley, from whom he took his name. He was enslaved with Mr. Bradley's family in Pendleton County. Although Bradley wrote that his owner was considered a kind master because he was not beaten and had enough to eat, Bradley stated that he was kicked and thrown around as a young child. When he was nine years old, he was hit so hard that he was knocked unconscious for a time and his owner thought he had killed him. As a fifteen-year-old, he became very sick due to overwork, which made his owner angry. In addition, the Bradley children made threatening gestures at times with knives and axes. He worked very hard, starting work at sunrise and not finishing until it was dark. From the time he was fourteen years old, he thought incessantly about how to obtain his freedom.

He taught himself to read easy words and to spell whenever he could from a spelling book that he acquired and kept in his hat. He convinced one of the owner's sons to teach him to write. His mistress found out about it on the second night of instruction. She chastised her son, telling him that if he could write, he could write a pass to help him escape. Bradley practiced on his own after that.

My master had kept me ignorant of everything he could. I was never told anything about God, or my own soul... [H]ow I longed to be able to read the Bible!

He moved with the Bradley family to Arkansas shortly after he turned fifteen. They lived near the Choctaw mission and Fort Towson in modern Oklahoma, which was then in the Arkansas Territory. After Mr. Bradley died, his widow had young James running her plantation.

=== Plan to purchase his freedom ===
One of the lessons that he learned as an enslaved person was to always deny any interest in desiring freedom, because he knew it would result in rough treatment. But, obtaining freedom was a strong, heart-breaking desire.

How strange it is that anybody should believe any human being could be a slave, and yet be contented! I do not believe that there ever was a slave, who did not long for liberty. I know very well that slave-owners take a great deal of pains to make the people in the free states believe that the slaves are happy; but I know, likewise, that I was never acquainted with a slave, however well he was treated, who did not long to be free. There is one thing about this, that people in the free states do not understand. When they ask slaves whether they wish for liberty, they answer, "No"; and very likely they will go as far as to say they would not leave their masters for the world. But at the same time, they desire liberty more than anything else, and have, perhaps all along been laying plans to get free. The truth is, if a slave shows any discontent, he is sure to be treated worse, and worked harder for it; and every slave knows this. This is why they are careful not to show any uneasiness when white men ask them about freedom. When they are alone by themselves, all their talk is about liberty – liberty! It is the great thought and feeling that fills the minds full all the time.

He developed a plan to buy his freedom. He worked all day, got a few hours of sleep, and then while others slept, he pursued several endeavors to make money. He started by using corn husks to weave collars for horses. He found a balance between maximizing how much time he was able to work at night and getting enough sleep that he was not too weak to work during the day. After eight years, he was able to purchase his freedom in 1833 for $700 (equivalent to $23,353 in 2025). He had another $200 (equivalent to $6,672 in 2025) to start his new life.

After toiling all day for my mistress, I used to sleep three or four hours, and then get up and work for myself the remainder of the night. I made collars for horses out of plaited husks. I could weave one in about eight hours; and generally I took time enough from my sleep to make two collars in the course of a week. I sold them for fifty cents each...

With my first money I bought a pig. The next year I earned for myself about thirteen dollars; and the next about thirty. There was a good deal of wild land in the neighborhood, that belonged to Congress. I used to go out with my hoe, and dig up little patches, which I planted with corn, and got up in the night to tend it. My hogs were fattened with this corn, and I used to sell a number each year. Besides this, I used to raise small patches of tobacco, and sell it to buy more corn for my pigs. In this way I worked for five years; at the end of which time, after taking out my losses, I found that I had earned one hundred and sixty dollars.

With this money I hired my own time for two years. During this period, I worked almost all the time, night and day. The hope of liberty stung my nerves, and braced up my soul so much, that I could do with very little sleep or rest. I could do a great deal more work than I was ever able to do before. At the end of the two years, I had earned three hundred dollars, besides feeding and clothing myself. I now bought my time for eighteen months longer, and went two hundred and fifty miles west, nearly into Texas, where I could make more money. Here I earned enough to buy myself, which I did in 1833, about one year ago. I paid for myself, including what I gave for my time, about seven hundred dollars.

== Freedom ==
Upon achieving his freedom, he headed for a free state. He visited for a time in Northern Kentucky and went to Covington, Kentucky, where he crossed the Ohio River that divided the slave states and the free states. He arrived at Cincinnati, Ohio.

== Education and anti-slavery efforts ==
=== Lane Seminary ===
Desiring to become a minister, Bradley was admitted to Lane Seminary on May 28, 1833. (Note: The source states that Bradley was admitted to the Literary department. Bradley probably attended the preparatory classes as he was not ready for college level courses. Bradley states, "I asked for admission into the Seminary. They pitied me, and granted my request, though I knew nothing of the studies which were required for admission. I am so ignorant, that I suppose it will take me two years to get up with the lowest class in the institution." Lane Seminary had three departments: literary, preparatory, and theological departments. The Walnut Hills School, located on the property of the seminary, offered preparatory courses from 1829 to 1834.) The first African-American student at Lane, he said that he was not treated differently because of the color of his skin. Lyman Beecher, the president of Lane, had instructed students at the seminary to be careful in the way that they interacted with black people. There were some students who did not believe in abolition of slavery, so when Lyman Beecher invited students to his home, Bradley felt it wiser not to attend. Beecher did not understand it was not enough to model careful behavior; he thought that Bradley did not come to the event because he was timid.

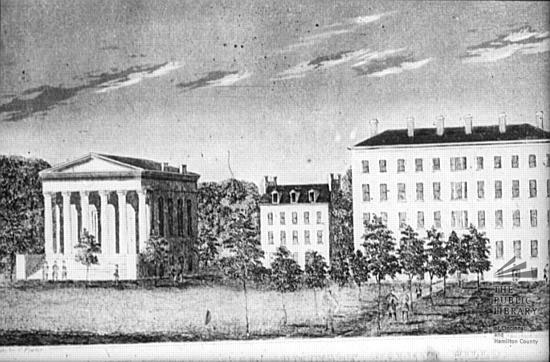
Lane Theological Seminary, Cincinnati, Ohio

When I arrived in Cincinnati, I heard of Lane Seminary, about two miles out of the city. I had for years been praying to God that my dark mind might see the light of knowledge... But in all respects I am treated just as kindly, and as much like a brother by the students, as if my skin were as white, and my education as good as their own. Thanks to the Lord, prejudice against color does not exist in Lane Seminary! If my life is spared, I shall probably spend several years here, and prepare to preach the gospel.

While at Lane, Bradley was the institute's coordinator for rescuing slaves in their quest to be free. He helped them cross the Ohio River and make their way towards Ontario, Canada. In 1834, his testimonial was printed in The Oasis, an annual edited by Lydia Maria Child.

=== Lane Seminary debates ===
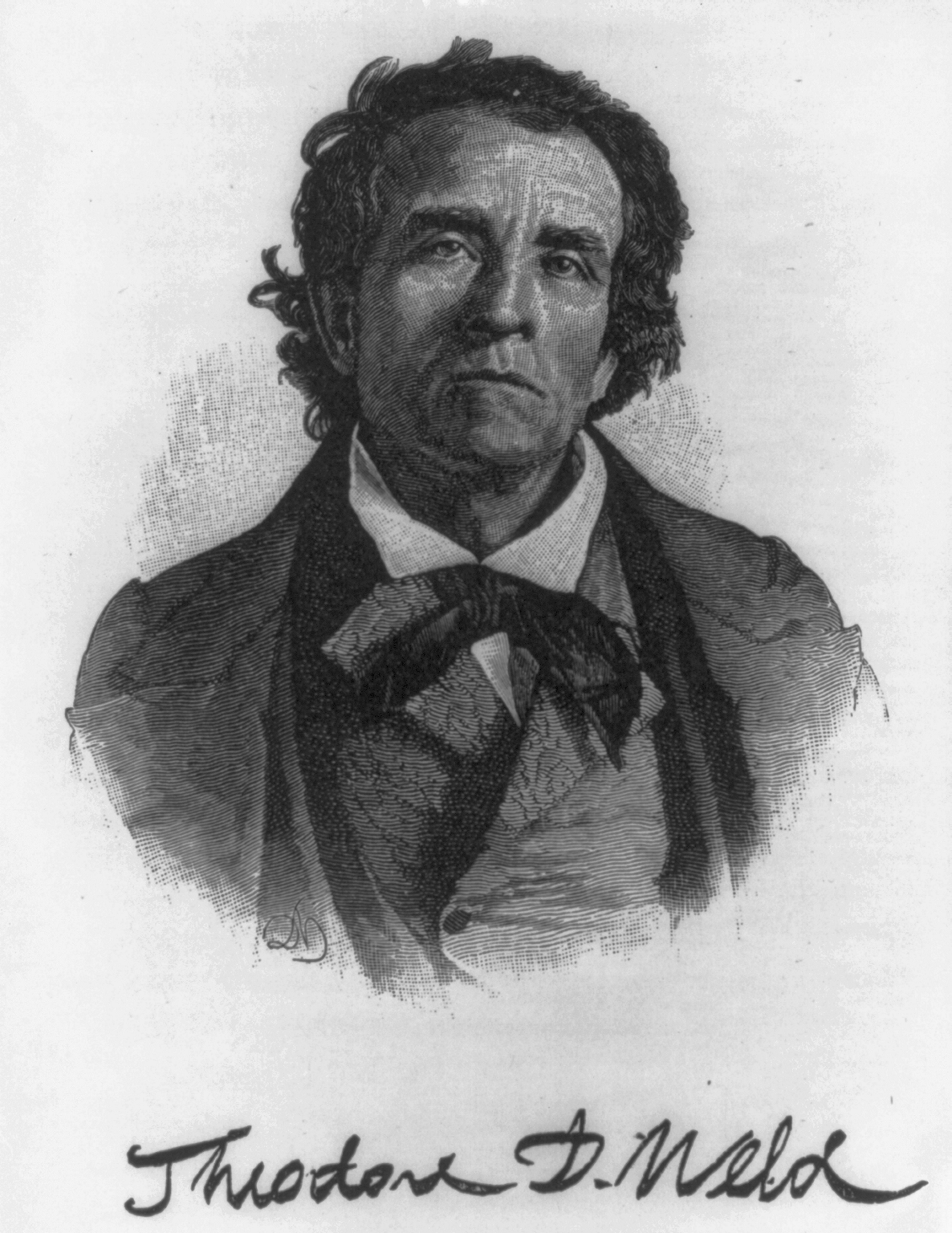
Theodore Dwight Weld, leader of the Lane Rebels.

William Garrison, publisher the anti-slavery newspaper, The Liberator, published a book in 1832 that offered Thoughts on African Colonization, Or, An Impartial Exhibition of the Doctrines, Principles and Purposes of the American Colonization Society. In both, he attacks the American Colonization Society and its intended strategy to send free blacks to Africa. Garrison said the Society was "pernicious, cruel, and delusive". At the time, most white Americans believed that whites and blacks could not live together as equals. They thought that it would be better to establish colonies in Africa for former slaves and convey them to the colonies on ships. Liberia was created by those believing in colonization for repatriated slaves. On the other hand, abolitionists saw slavery as morally wrong and that slaves should be emancipated as soon as possible.

Theodore Dwight Weld, an abolitionist and former student at the Oneida Institute, near Utica, New York, led debates at Oneida in 1833. Weld arrived at Lane Seminary and became the leader of the school's student body. He helped organize a debate about slavery and trained people to deliver "spirited" speeches. The debate represented the views of the abolitionists who were against slavery and believed in emancipation against others who thought that slaves should be sent to a colony in Africa. Harriet Beecher (Stowe), the daughter of Lane's president Lyman Beecher, was among those in attendance, according to historian Gilbert Barnes.

Bradley, who supported abolition of slavery, participated in the debates, and he was the only black person to speak. Some Southern students brought their slaves to the debates, but none of them were asked to comment. It is remarkable that not only would he speak, but people listened to him. He described what it was like to be a slave and brought his audience to tears when he described being on the slave ship. He stressed the need for equality, education, and freedom for all. Bradley's classmate, Henry B. Stanton (future husband of Elizabeth Cady Stanton), remarked that Bradley had thoroughly, intelligently, and thoughtfully addressed all the issues that are raised against immediate emancipation, such as "it would be unsafe to the community" or that "the condition of the emancipated negroes would be worse than it now is — that they are incompetent to provide for themselves — that they would become paupers and vagrants, and would rather steal than work for wages." Bradley also integrated humor in his speech. Both abolitionists and those who argued for colonization listened intently to the discussion, and a number of times the entire audience would respond with laughter. He made it clear that there was an innate desire of slaves to take care of themselves and others and what they most desired was freedom and education. Attendees found his speech to be very emotional and the most important one of the debates. The event was more like a revival than a debate, according to historian Donald M. Scott.

By the end of the speech many students were radicalized against slavery and students voted that they supported an end to slavery—immediately. The Colonization Society was voted out of existence. Some students formed an anti-slavery group, organized their efforts to establish a library, conducted Bible classes, and opened free schools in black neighborhoods. The classes became so full that potential students were turned away. At that time, one third of the state's blacks lived in Cincinnati. Bradley became a manager of the newly formed student anti-slavery society. Some of the members of the anti-slavery group went to New York to speak to the American Anti-Slavery Society about the debates and the resulting activities. Weld and the Lane Rebels integrated themselves within the black community, by renting rooms from boarding houses, attending weddings and funerals, and going to Prayer Meetings.

Local leaders and most of the trustees had Southern clients, and were concerned that their businesses would be affected as the result of the students' efforts. Many complained to Lane Seminary, while Beecher was out of town. The Board of Trustees put a stop to any anti-slavery efforts, condemned the debates, and issued a gag order against discussion of slavery. This caused many students, particularly those affiliated with Weld, to leave the school. They went to Oberlin College, making that school and town racially diverse and a center for leadership of the abolitionist movement.

=== Sheffield Manual Labor Institute ===
Bradley went with the other Lane Rebels to Oberlin Collegiate Institute (later Oberlin College) in 1835. He enrolled in 1836 in a satellite school Oberlin set up to handle the great influx of students: the Sheffield Manual Labor Institute, in Sheffield, Ohio, 17 miles (27 km) northeast of Oberlin. Sheffield had a high school level curriculum combined with manual labor. There was a plan to raise silkworms to create silk. The plan was not successful and the school closed after a year, in part because it refused to be a segregated school as required by recent Ohio legislation.

Unfortunately, nothing is known about Bradley's life after 1837. The final reference to him is in a letter that year of another Lane Rebel, C. Stewart Renshaw, who refers to him as "our dear brother". He may be the "negro, late of Sheffield College", who helped in the liberation of fourteen slaves from one plantation.

== Legacy ==
Bradley's speech was an example of the power of including people who are directly involved in a situation to speak to their issues and desires. It is generally people who have power—due to education, their profession, or wealth—that speak to social issues and potential solutions. Bradley showed that people who are directly involved should be part of the discourse.

The controversy surrounding the debates—due to Bradley's effectiveness as a speaker—"gave voice" to the anti-slavery movement, particularly as Weld and about 40 other Lane Rebels moved to Oberlin and the college became a leader in the abolitionist movement. Students at other colleges and universities initiated discussions about free speech at their campuses.

== Statue and plaque ==
External images
- Photo of statue of James Bradley
- Another photo of statue
- Photo of accompanying plaque

A statue of Bradley was erected in 1988 by the Greater Cincinnati Bicentennial Commission in Covington, Kentucky at roughly the place that Bradley crossed the Ohio River to Cincinnati. The statue, made by George Danhires, shows Bradley sitting on a riverfront bench, facing north across the Ohio River to Cincinnati, while reading a book. It was voted one of the top five interesting statues in the greater Cincinnati area in 2014. In 2016, the statue was restored.

== Media portrayal ==
Bradley appears as a character in the 2019 movie Sons & Daughters of Thunder, about the Lane Debates, based on a play by Earlene Hawley and Curtis Heeter.
