= Baxter Dickinson =

American minister

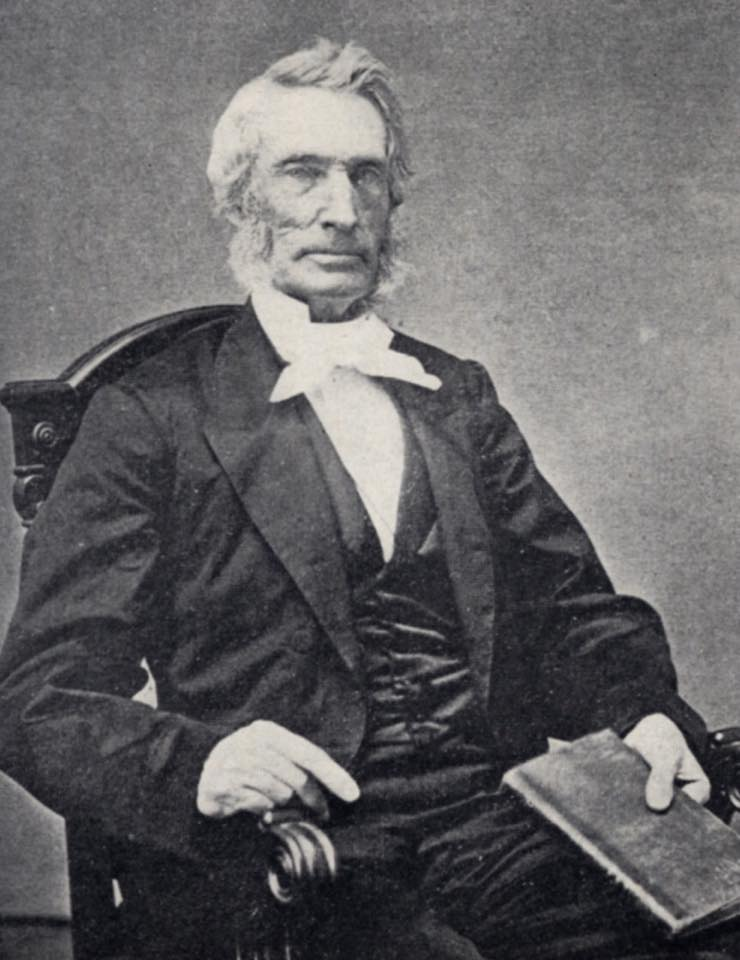
Baxter Dickinson

Baxter Dickinson (April 14, 1795 – December 5, 1875) was an American minister.

Dickinson, youngest son of Azariah and Mary (Eastman) Dickinson, was born in Amherst, Mass., April 14, 1795. He graduated from Yale College in 1817. He spent a year in teaching in Virginia, and in 1818 entered Andover Theological Seminary, where he completed the course in 1821. He was ordained and installed pastor of the Congregational Church in Longmeadow, Mass., March 5, 1823, and there remained until called to the 3rd Presbyterian Church in Newark, N.J., where he was installed November 17, 1829. He labored successfully for six years in that relation, and then accepted an invitation to the Professorship of Sacred Rhetoric and Pastoral Theology in Lane Seminary, Cincinnati. After four years of active devotion to the interests of that institution, he accepted an appointment to the corresponding chair in the seminary in Auburn, N.Y., and held the position eight years. For ten years he served the American and Foreign Christian Union as one of its District Secretaries at New York and Boston, and then removed with his family to Lake Forest, near Chicago, where with them he opened a Young Ladies' Seminary, which was successfully maintained until 1867. The infirmities of age rendering necessary a retirement from all labor, he removed in 1868 to Brooklyn, N. Y., to spend his closing years, and died in that city, December 5, 1875.

In 1838 he received the degree of Doctor of Divinity from Amherst College. He was the author of the paper known as the "True Doctrines," which was adopted in 1837 as the exponent of the doctrinal beliefs of the New School branch of the Presbyterian Church, and received the endorsement of both branches at the late Reunion. In 1839 he was the moderator of the New School General Assembly. He published several sermons, and some of these, as well as a volume of Letters to Students, were republished in England.

Dr. Dickinson was married, June 4, 1823, to Martha Bush, of Boylston, Mass., who survived him. Of their nine children, one son and three daughters survived him. Two of the sons graduated at Amherst College, Rev. Richard Salter Storrs Dickinson in 1844 and Rev. William Cowper Dickinson in 1848. William Cowper Dickinson's son was organist Clarence Dickinson.
