= Sons & Daughters of Thunder =

- Directed by: Kelly Rundle
- Screenplay by: Kelly and Tammy Rundle
- Based on: Sons & Daughters of Thunder by: Earlene Hawley; Curtis Heeter
- Produced by: Kimberly Kurtenbach
- Production company: Fourth Wall Films
- Release date: 2019
- Running time: 85 minutes
- Country: United States

Sons & Daughters of Thunder is a docudrama that portrays the true story of the Lane Seminary Debates on Slavery of 1834. Based upon a play from the 1970s by Earlene Hawley and Curtis Heeter, the film is the product of Kelly and Tammy Rundle of Fourth Wall Films of Moline, Illinois. The name Sons & Daughters of Thunder is based upon a Biblical phrase, Mark 3:17.

It was shown at the Harriet Beecher Stowe Center in Hartford, Connecticut, on September 12, 2019. The premiere was at the Putnam Museum's Giant Screen in Davenport, Iowa, on March 16, 2019, and it was scheduled for release across the country in May of that same year.

The film provides insight into events that preceded the end of slavery in the United States, including the anti-slavery novel Uncle Tom's Cabin (1852) by Harriet Beecher Stowe. Lane Seminary students conducted 18 days of debates about slavery. Theodore Dwight Weld was a co-founder of and a student at Lane Seminary. The debates, addressed colonization, which would remove every free American black to a colony in Africa. The debates also spoke of the horrors of slavery and were considered controversial and scandalous. James Bradley, a former slave, was one of the speakers during the debates, and he is portrayed in the movie as a speaker. There are also excerpts from a speech which Frederick Douglass, a social reformer and abolitionist, delivered on July 4, 1852.

Lane's board of trustees prohibited students from talking about slavery and put a gag order on anti-slavery students. Most of the students left Lane Seminary and enrolled at Oberlin College, where the students were free to discuss slavery.

Lyman Beecher, the president of Lane, was a colonizationist. Until the debates, Lyman's daughter Harriet Beecher [Stowe], was not aware of how horrible the conditions and treatment were for slaves. She got to know people who were on the Underground Railroad in Cincinnati and saw a slave auction in Kentucky. In 1852, she published Uncle Tom's Cabin, which President Abraham Lincoln credited it for starting the Civil War.

Jessica and Tom Taylor, a married couple, portray Harriet Beecher and Theodore Weld, an abolitionist. Kimberly Kurtenbach portrays Catherine Beecher, Harriet's sister, she was also the casting director and executive producer. Part of the movie was filmed at the Harriet Beecher Stowe House in Cincinnati, Ohio. It is the only building of the Lane Seminary still standing. The original score is by Bill Campbell of St. Ambrose.
