= George Danhires =

American painter

- Education: Ohio University
- Known for: Sculpture, painting

George Danhires, from Kent, Ohio, has been a sculptor since the 1980s. He has received commissions from private and public organizations. He has made sculptures honoring veterans in several states. Education, humanity, and freedom are other themes of his work.

He is also an oil-based paint artist. Danhires was on the faculty of the Myers School of Art at the University of Akron, Kent State University, and East Carolina University.

== Education ==
Danhires attended graduate school at Ohio University in the 1970s.

== Military ==
Danhires joined the United States Marine Corps (USMC) in 1959 and served for four years, without seeing combat. His brothers served during the Vietnam War and Korean conflict. He believes in the importance of public monuments to recognize veterans.

== Career ==
=== Artist ===
In 1987, he completed the bronze Vietnam Memorial sculpture for Pittsburgh, Pennsylvania. Danhires was the architect on the project and Ron Bennett was the artist. Other states have memorials to soldiers made by Danhires. The Ohio Statehouse has his works in its collection, including representations of the school of yesterday and the school of today in the Map Room.

A statue of James Bradley, a former slave, was erected in 1988 by Danhires, who was commissioned by the Greater Cincinnati Bicentennial Commission. The statue shows Bradley sitting on a riverfront bench, facing north across the Ohio River to Cincinnati, while reading a book. Located in Covington, Kentucky, it represents the journey of slaves along the Underground Railroad. Bradley was a slave and free man who taught himself to read. The statue was restored in 2016.

He created the Journey to Learning sculpture in Franklin County, Ohio, in 2000. It depicts children and two teachers. One of the children sits on a sculpture of alphabet letters and numbers. He created Claudia in Striped Dress. In 2010, he worked with fellow Ohio University alumni Robert Peppers and Tyrone Geter to create the Transitions: The Culture from Within exhibit for the school's Multicultural Center. The exhibit included their mixed media works, sculptures, paintings, and assemblages with spirituality and humanity as the theme.

He installed relief sculptures on Franklin Avenue in Kent, Ohio, for its bicentennial. Danhires was commissioned to create a 7 feet (2.1 m)-tall sculpture with three panels at the Veterans' Memorial at the Kent Central Gateway transit center, for a Veterans Day installation on November 11, 2013. He was hired by the Portage Area Regional Transportation Authority. The sculpture, created using the lost-wax casting method, is intended to honor all former soldiers, whether they died during war or are veterans. Each panel has the phrase "To honor all the men and women who serve" at the top of the work. Cutouts in the panels represent soldiers who have died. It is also a relief sculpture of veterans, one of which has a woman stepping forward to represent the increasing role of women in the military. A man in a wheelchair represents disabled veterans. Also in Kent, Ohio, is Danhire's Firefighter Memorial #4 sculpture.

=== Educator ===
He was on the faculty of the University of Akron's Myers School of Art. In 2017, his works and those of 12 others were shown in an exhibition of emeritus faculty of the Myers School of Art entitled "Continuity: Recent Works by Emeritus Faculty." He has also taught art at Kent State University and East Carolina University.
