= Farmington, Ohio =

Unincorporated community in Belmont County, Ohio

Coordinates: 40°6′32″N 80°49′12″W

Farmington is an unincorporated community in Belmont County, in the U.S. state of Ohio.

== History ==
Farmington was laid out in 1818. A former variant name of Farmington was Cope. A post office called Cope was established in 1874, and remained in operation until 1895.
