= Lane Seminary =

Theological college in Ohio, United States

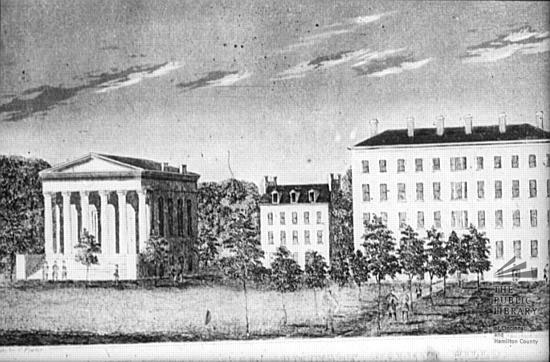
- Campus of Lane Seminary
- Other name: Lane Theological Seminary
- Type: Private seminary
- Active: 1829–1932
- Affiliations: Presbyterian
- President: Lyman Beecher (1832–1852)
- Academic staff: Calvin Stowe, Baxter Dickinson
- Location: Walnut Hills, Cincinnati, Ohio, 45206, United States; 39°7′48.62″N 84°29′17.84″W

Lane Seminary, sometimes called Cincinnati Lane Seminary, and later renamed Lane Theological Seminary, was a Presbyterian theological college that operated from 1829 to 1932 in Walnut Hills, Ohio, today a neighborhood in Cincinnati. Its campus was bounded by today's Gilbert, Yale, Park, and Chapel Streets.

Its board intended it to be "a great central theological institution at Cincinnati — soon to become the great Andover or Princeton of the West." However, the founding and first years of Lane were difficult and contentious, culminating in a mass student exodus over the issue of slavery, or more specifically whether students were permitted to discuss the topic publicly, the first major academic freedom incident in America. There was strong pro-slavery sentiment in Cincinnati, and the trustees immediately prohibited further discussion of the topic, to avoid repercussions. With the city being on the border of the South, a lot of fugitive slaves and freedmen went through Cincinnati, including James Bradley, who would participate in the pivotal Lane slavery debates in the 1830s. Their competition for jobs had led to the anti-abolitionist Cincinnati riots of 1829 and would soon produce the Cincinnati riots of 1836.

== Inauguration ==
"The founding of Lane Seminary was accomplished after years of sometimes disparate efforts on the part of a large number of people." The Presbyterian tradition was to have educated clergy, and there was no seminary serving the vast and increasingly populated lands west of the Allegheny Mountains. As early as 1825, the denomination was on record as saying such a seminary was needed. In 1829 there were only 8,000 ministers to serve a population of 12,000,000, two thousand more churches than ministers, and only 200 ministers per year being trained. While there were local efforts to have the new seminary in Cincinnati, the Presbyterian General Assembly decided in 1827 to locate it in Allegheny, Pennsylvania, near Pittsburgh. The western synods refused to accept this, finding it too far away.

In the summer of 1828 Ebenezer Lane, a New Orleans businessman, "made known his interest in setting up a theological seminary near Cincinnati based on the manual labor system." He and his brother Lane pledged $4,000 for the new school, on condition that it be in Cincinnati and follow the manual labor model. After this, their connection with the Seminary was minimal; Ebenezer was not even happy that it carried his name. The land was donated by Kemper Seminary. "Walnut Hill was a pretty little village, quite distant from Cincinnati, the first stopping-place for the stage on the Madisonville or some other northern Ohio route." "The location of Lane Seminary is in the midst of a most beautiful landscape. There is just enough, and just the right admixture of hills and dale, forest and field, to give it the effect we love in gazing upon a calm and quiet scene of beauty," wrote a visiting minister in 1842.

A board was set up in October 1828, and the Ohio General Assembly issued a charter on February 11, 1829, specifying that the manual labor system would be "the fundamental principle" of the Seminary. The Rev. George C. Beckwith was appointed to a professorship in April, accepted in August, and he arrived in Cincinnati in the following November. He "had 3 or 4 students during the winter." In July, 1830, Beckwith visited the Oneida Institute and wrote back to Cincinnati that manual labor worked well and that the farmers and mechanics of the neighborhood approved of it. He resigned in August 1830. "At that time [1830], the seminary consisted of some woods and one foundation for a building."

In January, 1831, George Washington Gale, president of the Oneida Institute, recommended a steward to supervise the Seminary farm; in February the trustees made the appointment. But in the winter of 1830–31, "Lane Seminary was in a state of suspended animation. There were no teachers and apparently only two students, Amos Dresser and Horace Bushnell, who had come out from the Oneida Institute and had been given special permission by the trustees to occupy rooms in the lonesome Seminary building." Bushnell, who on his arrival in 1830 "found [at the embryonic Lane] no theology", slept "on a study-table, with his books for a pillow".

In 1834, the manual labor department contained six printing presses, operated by 20 students, and had printed 150,000 copies of "Webster's spelling books", for a bookstore. 30 students were employed in cabinet making, and total enrollment before the mass walkout was about 100.

== The Oneida Institute and Lane ==
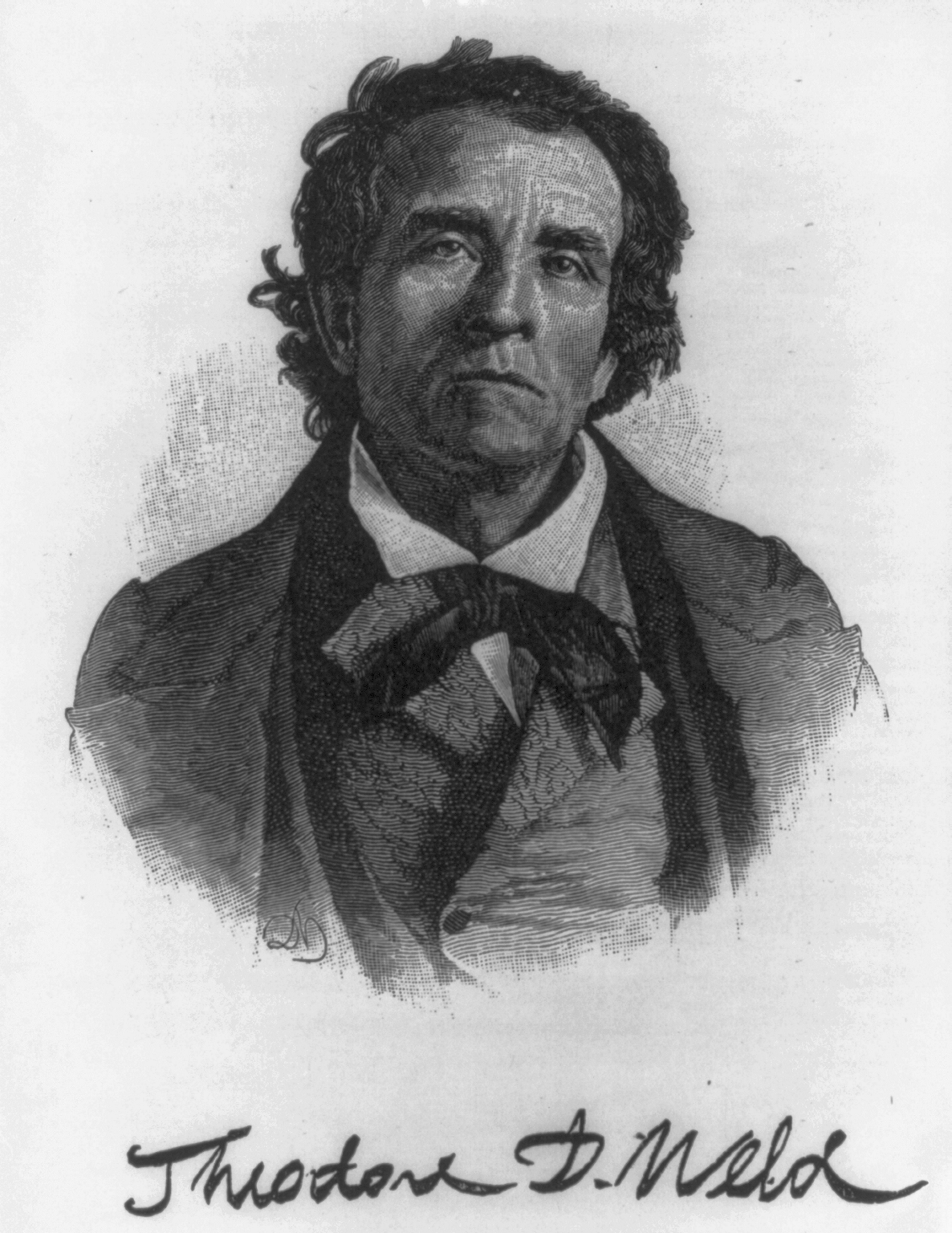
Theodore Dwight Weld, leader of the Lane Rebels

By coincidence, the local efforts to set up a seminary fit with the desires of the Tappan philanthropists, Arthur and Lewis, to found a seminary in what was then the growing west of the new country.

The charismatic Theodore D. Weld had been one of the first Oneida students, first studying and working on George Washington Gale's farm, then at Gale's Oneida Institute of Science and Industry from its opening in 1827 through 1830. When he left Oneida, he was hired by the new Manual Labor Society, an institution created to employ Weld, its only employee ever. Funded by the same Tappan brothers that had funded Oneida, his charge was "to find a site for a great national manual labor institution...where training for the western ministry could be provided for poor but earnest young men who had dedicated their lives to the home missionary cause in the 'vast valley of the Mississippi'". Weld himself was seeking to continue his preparation for a career as a minister. As he put it in his report, "though I can no longer publicly advocate it as the agent of your society, I hope soon to plead its cause in the humbler sphere of personal example, while pursuing my professional studies, in a rising institution at the west, in which manual labor is a DAILY REQUISITION."

"Cincinnati was the logical location. Cincinnati was the focal center of population and commerce in the Ohio valley." In the pre-railroad era, Cincinnati was the most accessible city in what was then the west of the United States.

Weld stopped at Cincinnati twice on his manual labor lecture and scouting tour: in February and March 1832, and in the following September. On the earlier visit, when the campus was run by F. Y. Vail, who spent more time fundraising than teaching, he delivered several lectures and supported the call to famous revivalist Charles Grandison Finney to come west; Finney declined, though he did come three years later, as professor and later president of the new Oberlin Collegiate Institute. Weld's second choice—and it was his choice, because the Tappans relied on his recommendations—was Lyman Beecher, father of Henry Ward Beecher, who would graduate from Lane, and Harriet Beecher Stowe; Lane had been trying to recruit him since February 1831. Lane, Weld concluded, would do as a manual labor theological school, if Beecher would come. "Such an institution would undoubtedly attract many of Weld's associates who had been disappointed in the failure to establish theological instruction at the Oneida Institute." Beecher did come, as president and as "Chair of Systematic Theology", motivated by the promise of a $20,000 subvention for Lane from "Tappan". Beecher, along with professor Thomas J. Biggs, future president of Cincinnati College, began as president December 26, 1832; this is when "Lane actually began operation.... Before that time, staff was slight and housing meager." The house the Beecher family lived in is now known as the Harriet Beecher Stowe House.

The students at Lane took the initiative in the affairs of the seminary and practiced piety mixed with practicality in the Oneida manner. In March of 1833 thirty-two students, including apparently all the Oneida Institute "alumni" then present, petitioned against the serving of that harmful and expensive drink, coffee, at the boarding house.

"Lane was Oneida moved west." Early in June 1833, Weld, Robert L. Stanton, and "six other young Finneyites" arrived in Cincinnati, having completed their journey by river from Rochester and Oneida. "They were promptly admitted to the seminary on the recommendation of two other 'Oneidas' [Porter and Weed] already in attendance." However, although technically enrolled as a student, and having declined the chair of Sacred Rhetoric and Oratory, Weld was the de facto head of Lane; "He...told the trustees what appointments to make." "Many of the students considered him the real leader of Lane", their "patron saint". "In the estimation of the class, he was president. He took the lead of the whole institution. The young men had, many of them, been under his care, and they thought he was a god."

The tempo of the seminary was sharply stepped up, its real head now being on the ground. "Weld is here & we are glad," wrote Professor Biggs on July 2.

According to Beecher, "among those students was an embodiment of a greater piety and talent than he had ever known to be collected in any other institution."

The self-assembling at Lane of men from very diverse places, called by a modern writer an invasion, was so colorful that multiple authors have described it. The earliest is from Weld himself; he is one of the "two members":

Resolved, that the smoking of segars will, in no case, be allowed in any building of the Seminary, —November 30, 1832

A few months since, two members of the same institution, who had enjoyed the benefits of the manual labor system for some years, and who wished soon to enter upon their professional studies, left the Institute with their packs upon their backs, and shaped their course for the Lane Seminary, at Cincinnati, Ohio, the nearest theological institution where manual labor was made a requisition, and incorporated into the system. They traveled on foot to Olean, in the state of New-York, at the head of the Allegany river, hired themselves out to work a raft, descended the river three hundred miles to its junction with the Ohio, at Pittsburg[h], and thence five hundred miles farther to Cincinnati. Upon their arrival, they received each twenty-two dollars for their services as raftsmen. A few months after four other students of the same institution, upon the same errand, traveled the same route, in the same way. A number more expect soon to start for the same destination, and if rafts are to be found they hope to enjoy the privilege of working their passage."

A contemporary commentator points to the work on rafts as reflecting the students' experience with manual labor at Oneida.

A modern retelling of the same incident:

Meanwhile, young men gathered in Cincinnati "as from the hives of the north". Most of them were from western New York. H[enry] B. Stanton and a few others from Rochester floated down the Ohio from Pittsburgh on a raft. More than a score came from Oneida Institute. Even more arrived from Utica and Auburn, Finney's converts all. From Tennessee came Weld's disciple, Marius Robinson, and across the Ohio from Kentucky came James Thome, scion of a wealthy planting family. Up from Alabama journeyed two others of Weld's disciples, the sons of the Rev. Dr. Allan. From Virginia came young Hedges; and from Missouri, Andrew, of the famous family of Benton. From the South came another, James Bradley, a Negro who had bought his freedom from slavery with the earnings of his own hands. Most of these students were mature; only eleven were less than twenty-one years old; twelve of them had been agents for the national benevolent societies, and six were married men with families. The theological class was the largest that had ever gathered in America, and its members were deeply conscious of their importance.

Resolved, that it is inexpedient for students, during their continuance in this institution, to form connections by marriage, and that forming such connection is a sufficient ground for dismission from the Seminary. —June 25, 1834

"[T]he institution itself is second in importance to no other in the United States." Beecher "assured us that he had more brains in this theological camp than could be found in any other in the United States."

In 1831, when the Rev. Lewis D. Howell, a student at Auburn Seminary at the time of Finney's revival there, was interim teacher of the Literary Department, there were fifty young men attending the seminary. Amos Dresser was the only New Yorker among them, but this was not to last long. Three Oneida students went west to teach country schools in the winter of 1831–32. George Whipple and J. L. Tracy went to Kentucky; Calvin Waterbury got a school at Newark on the Licking River in Ohio. When in the spring Waterbury talked too much temperance, the inhabitants threatened to ride him out of town on a rail. He prudently climbed aboard a raft and floated down to Cincinnati. There, he and Dresser were soon joined by two other Oneidas, Sereno W. Streeter and Edward Weed.

Beecher, in his autobiography, takes a dig at Oberlin, while claiming that there were already "colored students" at Lane: "It was with great difficulty, and only in the prospect of rich endowments and of securing a large class of students, that the principle of admission irrespective of color, already in practice at Lane, received from the trustees of Oberlin a cold and ambiguous sanction." What he says about Oberlin is roughly correct, but none of the black students at Oneida moved to Lane. The one black student currently known of at Lane, James Bradley, by his own description "so ignorant, that I suppose it will take me two years to get up with the lowest class in the institution," despite Beecher's regret felt it wiser not to attend a student gathering at Beecher's home.

== The slavery debates ==
Lane Seminary
- Part of Abolitionism in the United States
- Date: February 1834
- Location: Lane Theological Seminary, Walnut Hills, Cincinnati, Ohio, U.S.
- Participants: Theodore Dwight Weld (Student leader); James Bradley (Student and former slave); Henry B. Stanton (Student organizer); Lyman Beecher (Seminary President)
- Outcome: Majority vote favoring immediate emancipation of slaves; Trustee gag order on anti-slavery organizing; Mass exodus of students (the "Lane Rebels") to Oberlin College; Early milestone for American academic freedom

Lane Seminary is known primarily for the debates held there over 18 evenings in February 1834; John Rankin was in attendance, as was Harriet Beecher Stowe, daughter of Lane's president. They were nominally on the topic of colonization of freed slaves, on sending them to (not "back to") Africa.

They were publicized nationally and influenced the nation's thinking about slavery, creating support for abolition. A four-page report by H. B. Stanton appeared in March in both The Liberator and the New York Evangelist, and Garrison and Knapp, printers of The Liberator and most books on slavery in the U.S. in the early 1830s, issued it in pamphlet form. A seven-page response, under the title "Education and slavery", appeared in the Cincinnati-based Western Monthly Magazine; Weld published a lengthy reply. The affair got further publicity late in 1834, when 51 of the Lane students — the vast majority — published a 28-page pamphlet, A statement of the reasons which induced the students of Lane Seminary, to dissolve their connection with that institution (Cincinnati, 1834).

=== Background ===
==== The abolition–colonization controversy ====
Part of "the negro problem", as it was seen in the antebellum United States, was the question of what to do with former slaves who had become free. Since the eighteenth century, Quakers and others had preached the sinfulness of slave ownership, and the number of freedmen (and freed women) was rising and showed every sign that it would continue to grow. The freed slaves married and had children, so the number of free people of color (Blacks born free) was rising even faster. Some owners freed their slaves in their wills. Philanthropic societies and individuals raised or donated funds to purchase slaves' freedom; freedmen sometimes were able to purchase the freedom of family members. In some Northern cities there were more than a handful of escaped slaves.

The status of these free blacks was anything but comfortable. They were not citizens and in most states could not vote. They had no access to the courts or protection by the police. In no state could their children attend the public schools. They were subject to discriminatory treatment in everyday life.

The original "remedy" for this problem was to help them go "back to Africa". The British had been doing this, in Sierra Leone, moving former American slaves there who had gained their freedom by escaping to British lines during the American Revolution, and who found Nova Scotia, where the British took many of them, too cold. (Note: See Black Nova Scotians.) The British also took to Sierra Leone slaves captured from slaving ships who were being smuggled illegally across the Atlantic to North America. A well-to-do African-American shipowner, Paul Cuffe, transported some former slaves to Sierra Leone.

However, sending former slaves to a British colony as a policy was politically unacceptable. The American Colonization Society was formed to help found a new, American colony of freed blacks. Although there was some talk of locating the colony in the American territories of the Midwest, or on the Pacific coast—a sort of reservation for Blacks—what was decided was to follow the English example and start an African colony. The closest available land was what became Liberia.

==== The rejection of colonization ====
The colonization project got off to a promising start, with various governmental and private donations and the participation of distinguished individuals: U.S. presidents Jefferson, Monroe, and Madison; Senator Henry Clay, who presided over its first meeting; as well as most of the future white abolitionists. The problem had been solved, and in an honorable way; the former slaves would fare better in Africa, it was argued, among other blacks.

The situation quickly started to unravel. First of all, the disease rates among the new colonists were the highest since accurate record-keeping began. Over 50% of them died of malaria and other diseases.

Particularly telling to Gerrit Smith, an abolitionist philanthropist, was that the American Colonization Society allowed the sale of alcohol (as well as guns and chewing tobacco) in the colonies that became Liberia. He commented on it in the Society's African Repository magazine. Smith was for temperance, and according to him, the fact that blacks in Africa were allowed to import liquor from the United States revealed the true goals of many of the white members of the American Colonization Society: to get rid of the Blacks without having them up north.

=== Weld organizes "debates" ===
Lyman Beecher, head of the Seminary, was a colonizationist, and gave a speech on that topic to the Cincinnati Colonization Society on June 4, 1834. At Lane there was a "colonization society", supporting the efforts of the American Colonization Society to send free blacks to Africa, to Liberia. How it came to be is not known, but it was there when the Oneida contingent and friends arrived. There had been similar groups at Western Reserve and other colleges.

Weld read William Lloyd Garrison's new abolitionist newspaper The Liberator, begun in 1831, and his Thoughts on African Colonization, which appeared in 1832. These had a great influence at the other eastern Ohio college, Western Reserve College, leading to Beriah Green's four published sermons, and his relocation under pressure to Gale's school, Oneida. What Garrison desired, and he convinced Green, was "immediatism": immediate, complete, and uncompensated freeing of all slaves.

Over a period of several months Weld convinced nearly all of the students individually of the superiority of the abolitionist view. To generate publicity for the abolitionist cause, Weld announced a series of "debates". Weld "had no intention of holding a debate on the pros and cons of antislavery." "There was little opposition, little conflict, and consequently little debate." In his correspondence Weld informed friends that he was trying to get the anti-slavery (immediatist) argument and evidence out to as many people as possible. Nevertheless, what was announced was debates, on two points.

When the merits of the proposed solutions to slavery were debated over 18 days at the Seminary in February 1834, it was one of the first major public discussions of the topic, but it was more of an anti-slavery revival than a "debate". No speaker appeared to defend either American slavery or the colonization project.

=== The stated topics of the debates ===
The two specific questions addressed were:

- "Ought the people of the slaveholding states abolish slavery immediately?", and
- "Are the doctrines, tendencies, and measures of the American Colonization Society, and the influence of its principal supporters, such as render it worthy of the patronage of the Christian public?"

The debates were not transcribed, and there was no attempt afterwards, as there would be later with Pennsylvania Hall, to collect the texts which were written out — not all were — and make a booklet of them. However, Garrison promptly published a pamphlet, and there are excerpts in newspapers and books.

Each question was debated for two and a half hours a night for nine nights. Among the participants:

- Eleven had been born and brought up in slave states.
- Seven were sons of slaveowners.
- One had only recently ceased to be a slaveowner.
- One, Bradley, had been a slave and had bought his freedom.
- Ten had lived in slave states.
- One, Birney, had been an agent of the Colonization Society.

Arguments addressing the first question in favor of the immediate abolition of slavery included:

- Slaves long for freedom.
- When inspired with a promise of freedom, slaves will toil with incredible alacrity and faithfulness.
- No matter how kind their master is, slaves are dissatisfied and would rather be hired servants than slaves.
- Blacks are abundantly able to take care of and provide for themselves.
- Blacks would be kind and docile if immediately emancipated.

In response to the second question, the Reverend Samuel H. Cox, who had served as an agent for the Colonization Society, testified that his view of the Society's plan changed when he realized that no blacks, despite the claims of those who ventured to speak for them, would ever consent to be removed from their native country and transplanted to a foreign land. He reasoned, therefore, that the plan could only be enacted by a "national society of kidnappers".

=== Participants ===
==== Notable people present ====
"The President, and the members of the faculty, with one exception [Biggs, an "implacable foe" of abolitionism], were present during parts of the discussion."

- Gamaliel Bailey, physician, lecturer on physiology at Lane, who went on to become an abolitionist newspaper editor.
- Harriet Beecher Stowe, at that time simply Harriet Beecher, daughter of Lane's president; 18 years later published Uncle Tom's Cabin.
- Henry Ward Beecher, alumnus, minister, called, after his father Lyman, "the most noted minister of the nineteenth century". Supported sending rifles ("Beecher's Bibles") to emigrants trying to make Kansas a free state.
- Lyman Beecher, president of Lane, father of Henry and Harriet.
- James G. Birney, attorney, former American Colonization Society Agent, author of a lengthy published break with or attack on the Society. "His knowledge and pervasive influence informed the Lane Seminary debate, lifting it to the height of its subject."
- James Bradley (former slave), the only Black participant.
- Samuel Crothers (probable but unconfirmed)
- Amos Dresser, Lane student; would become famous for being publicly whipped in Nashville, Tennessee, for distributing abolitionist literature.
- Huntington Lyman
- Asa Mahan, minister, and the only Lane trustee who supported the students; resigned with the students and accompanied them to the Oberlin Collegiate Institute, becoming its first president.
- John Rankin (abolitionist), author of the first American anti-slavery book, and key figure on the Underground Railroad in Ohio. In 1835 Rankin published a pamphlet defending the students who debated.
- Henry Brewster Stanton, future abolitionist speaker and politician, and husband of Elizabeth Cady Stanton.
- Calvin Ellis Stowe, Lane professor, future husband of Harriet Beecher.
- Theodore Dwight Weld, former Oneida student, anti-slavery activist.
- Hiram Wilson, former Oneida student; moved to Canada and ran Canadian terminus for the Underground Railroad.

=== Speakers at the debates ===
- "Mr. Henry P. Thompson, a native and still a resident of Nicholasville, Kentucky, made the following statement at a public meeting in Lane Seminary, Ohio, in 1833 [1834]. He was at that time a slaveholder."

Cruelties, said he, are so common, I hardly know what to relate. But one fact occurs to me just at this time, that happened in the village where I live. The circumstances are these. A colored man, a slave, ran away. As he was crossing Kentucky river, a white man, who suspected him, attempted to stop him. The negro resisted. The white man procured help, and finally succeeded in securing him. He then wreaked his vengeance on him for resisting — flogging him till he was not able to walk. They then put him on a horse, and came on with him ten miles to Nicholasville. When they entered the village, it was noticed that he sat upon his horse like a drunken man. It was a very hot day; and whilst they were taking some refreshment, the negro sat down upon the ground, under the shade. When they ordered him to go, he made several efforts before he could get up; and when he attempted to mount the horse, his strength was entirely insufficient. One of the men struck him, and with an oath ordered him to get on the horse without any more fuss. The negro staggered back a few steps, fell down, and died. I do not know that any notice was ever taken of it.

- "Rev. Coleman S. Hodges, a resident of Western Virginia, gave the following testimony at the same meeting:"

I have frequently seen the mistress of a family in Virginia, with whom I was well acquainted, beat the woman who performed the kitchen work, with a stick two feet and a half long, and nearly as thick as my wrist; striking her over the head, and across the small of the back, as she was bent over at her work, with as much spite as you would a snake, and for what I should consider no offence at all. There lived in this same family a young man, a slave, who was in the habit of running away. He returned one time after a week’s absence. The master took him into the barn, stripped him entirely naked, tied him up by his hands so high that he could not reach the floor, tied his feet together, and put a small rail between his legs, so that he could not avoid the blows, and commenced whipping him. He told me that he gave him five hundred lashes. At any rate, he was covered with wounds from head to foot. Not a place as big as my hand but what was cut. Such things as these are perfectly common all over Virginia; at least so far as I am acquainted. Generally, planters avoid punishing their slaves before strangers.

- "Mr. Calvin H. Tate, of Missouri, whose father and brother were slaveholders, related the following at the same meeting. The plantation on which it occurred, was in the immediate neighborhood of his father's."

A young woman, who was generally very badly treated, after receiving a more severe whipping than usual, ran away. In a few days she came back, and was sent into the field to work. At this time the garment next her skin was stiff like a scab, from the running of the sores made by the whipping. Towards night, she told her master that she was sick, and wished to go to the house. She went, and as soon as she reached it, laid down on the floor exhausted. The mistress asked her what the matter was? She made no reply. She asked again; but received no answer. "I'll see," said she, "if I can’t make you speak." So taking the tongs, she heated them red hot, and put them upon the bottoms of her feet; then upon her legs and body; and, finally, in a rage, took hold of her throat. This had the desired effect. The poor girl faintly whispered, "Oh, misse, don't — I am most gone", and expired.

- The most notable speaker at the debates was James Bradley, as he was the only Black participant and so far as is known the only Black in attendance. This is the first instance in the history of the United States that a Black man addressed a white audience:

James Bradley, the emancipated slave above alluded to, addressed us nearly two hours; and I wish his speech could have been heard by every opponent of immediate emancipation, to wit: first, that "it would be unsafe to the community;" second, that "the condition of the emancipated negroes would be worse than it now is; that they are incompetent to provide for themselves; that they would become paupers and vagrants, and would rather steal than work for wages." This shrewd and intelligent black, cut up these white objections by the roots, and withered and scorched them under the sun of sarcastic argumentation, for nearly an hour, to which the assembly responded in repeated and spontaneous roars of laughter, which were heartily joined in by both Colonizationists and Abolitionists. Do not understand me as saying, that his speech was devoid of argument. No. It contained sound logic, enforced by apt illustrations. I wish the slanderers of negro intellect could have witnessed this unpremeditated effort. ..."They [the enslaved] have to take care of, and support themselves now, and their master, and his family into the bargain; and this being so, it would be strange if they could not provide for themselves, when disencumbered from this load." He said the great desire of the slaves was "liberty and education." "How strange it is that anybody should believe any human being could be a slave, and yet be contented! I do not believe there ever was a slave, who did not long for liberty. I know very well that slave-owners take a great deal of pains to make the people in the free States believe that the slaves are happy; but I know, likewise, that I was never acquainted with a slave, however well he was treated, who did not long to be free. There is one thing about this, that people in the free States do not understand. When they ask slaves whether they wish for their liberty, they answer, 'No;' and very likely they will go so far as to say they would not leave their masters for the world. But, at the same time, they desire liberty more than anything else, and have, perhaps, all along been laying plans to get free. The truth is, if a slave shows any discontent, he is sure to be treated worse, and worked the harder for it; and every slave knows this. This is why they are careful not to show any uneasiness when white men ask them about freedom. When they are alone by themselves, all their talk is about liberty — liberty! It is the great thought and feeling that fills the mind full all the time."

=== Sequelae (the following events) ===
The debates were closely followed by the national press and the religious community.

"The trustees soon expressed a determination to prevent all further discussion of the comparative merits of the policy of the Colonization Society, and the doctrine of immediate emancipation, either in the recitation rooms, the rooms of the students, or at the public table; although no objection had previously been made to the free discussion of any subject whatever. During the vacation that followed, in the absence of a majority of the professors, this purpose was framed into a law, or rule, of the seminary, and obedience to it required from all."

The trustees laid down the doctrine that "no associations or societies ought to be allowed in the seminary, except such as have for their immediate object, improvement in the prescribed course of studies." This was followed by an order in these words: "Ordered that the students be required to discontinue those societies [the Anti-slavery and Colonization societies] in the seminary."

The event resulted in the dismissal of a professor, John Morgan, and the departure of a group of 40 students and a trustee. It was one of the first significant tests in the United States of academic freedom and the right of students to participate in free discussion. It also marked the first organized student body in American history. Several of those involved went on to play an important role in the abolitionist movement and the buildup to the American Civil War.

At the end of the debate, many of the participants concluded not only that slavery was a sin, but also that the policy of the American Colonization Society to send blacks to Africa was wrong. As a result, these students formed an antislavery society and began organizing activities and outreach work among the black population of Cincinnati. They intended to attain the emancipation of blacks, not by rebellion or force, but by "approaching the minds of slave holders with the truth, in the spirit of the Gospel."

== After the debates ==
=== Activities in the black community ===
"We believe faith without works is dead," Weld wrote to Arthur Tappan in 1834. He, Augustus Wattles, and other students created a school out of three rooms, and raised hundreds of dollars to outfit a library and rent classrooms. Classes were run both days and evenings, and the school was soon at capacity. Inspired by Prudence Crandall's example, he also set up a school for black women, and Arthur Tappan paid $1,000 (equivalent to $32,250 in 2025) for four female teachers to relocate from New York to Cincinnati. As Lewis Tappan put it in his biography of his brother, "[T]he anti-slavery students of Lane Seminary established evening-schools for the adults, and day-schools for the children of the three thousand colored of Cincinnati."

Weld continued to Tappan:

We have formed a large and efficient organization for elevating the colored people in Cincinnati—have established a Lyceum among them, and lecture three or four evenings a week on grammar, geography, arithmetic, natural philosophy, &c. Besides this, an evening free school, for teaching them to read, is in operation every week day evening; and we are about establishing one or two more. We are also getting up a library for circulation among those who can read, and are about establishing a reading room. In addition to this two of our students, one theological and one literary [Augustus Wattles and Marius Robinson], have felt so deeply their degradation, and have been so affected by the intense desire to acquire knowledge which they exhibit, that they have taken a dismission from the institution, and commenced a school among the blacks in the city. They expect to teach a year, and them take up their course in the seminary again, when others will no doubt be ready to take their places. The first went down and opened a school, and it was filled the first day, and that mainly with adults, and those nearly grown. For a number of days he rejected from ten to twenty daily, because he could not teach them. This induced the other dear brother to leave his studies and join him. Both are now incessantly occupied.

Besides these two day schools, and the evening schools, and the lectures, we have three large Sabbath schools and Bible classes among the colored people. By sections in rotation, and teaching the evening reading schools in the same way, we can perform an immense amount of labor among them, without interference with our studies.

=== The threat of violence ===
Cincinnati was convulsed as never before. Rumors circulated during the summer of 1834 about mob violence against the Seminary; the threat of violence had caused Miami University of Ohio to ban the discussion of abolition. Cincinnati, largely pro-Southern, had already experienced the anti-black Cincinnati riot of 1829; and the huge anti-abolition riots in New York in July 1834, which specifically targeted the Tappans, were heavily reported in the Cincinnati newspapers. In 1835, after the whipping of Amos Dresser, a Lane student, in Nashville, newspapers of that city "warn[ed] the leaders of that institution to be cautious how they proceed."

=== Trustees ban the discussion of abolition ===
As Cincinnati businessmen, the members of the school's board of trustees were quite concerned about being associated with such a radical expression of abolitionism, which could have led to a physical attack on the Seminary. "A riot was very [narrowly] averted, probably only because of Lane's summer vacation."

President Beecher did not want to escalate the matter by overreacting, but when the press began to turn public opinion against the students that summer, he was fundraising in Boston. In his absence, the executive committee of the trustees issued a report ordering the abolishment of the school's antislavery society, stating that "no associations or Societies among the students ought to be allowed in the Seminary except such as have for their immediate object improvement in the prescribed course of studies." They also declared that they had the right to dismiss any student "when they shall think it necessary to do so." They further adopted a rule to "discourage...such discussions and conduct among the students as are calculated to divert their attention from their studies", meaning that students were not to discuss abolitionism even when dining (talking to students while they were eating was specifically prohibited in the Standing Rules enacted by the trustees on October 13, 1834.) The committee underlined their position by dismissing professor John Morgan for taking the side of the students. In October, without waiting for Beecher to return, the board ratified the committee's resolutions.

On his return, Beecher and two professors issued a statement intended to assuage the anger of the students regarding the action of the trustees, but it was regarded by the students as a faculty endorsement of the trustees' action.

=== The "Lane Rebels" resign ===
On October 21, most of the students resigned, as did trustee Asa Mahan (another member of Finney's contingent). (Technically, they requested dismissal from the school, which was granted.) In December they published a pamphlet of 28 pages, published anonymously but written by Weld, on "the reasons which induced the students of Lane Seminary, to dissolve their connection with that institution." The pamphlet received national attention, as it was reprinted in full in The Liberator.

Hostile press reports turned this incorrectly into the expulsion of the students, "in consequence of the dangerous principles they held in relation to slavery."

The Rebels were a loosely defined group, and different sources give different names and figures. The Statement had 51 signatures, but it adds that "several of our brethren, who coincide with us in sentiment, are not able to affix their names to this document, in consequence of being several hundred miles from the Seminary." According to Lane, there were 40, including the entirety of Lane's first class, the class of 1836 (which began in 1833). There were also prospective students who declined to enroll. Lawrence Lesick, author of the only book on the Lane Rebels, gives a figure of 75, but 19 more had left before the trustees took action, and only 8 students, out of 103, remained at Lane at the beginning of the next term. According to Oberlin, 32 of them enrolled, although some others who enrolled at the same time, though not students at Lane, are considered part of the Rebels. A few enrolled at other schools, such as Auburn Theological Seminary.

Weld and some other student leaders at Lane — William T. Allan, Weld's collaborator and president of Lane's new anti-slavery society; James A. Thome, a prominent speaker during the debates; and Henry B. Stanton — had been threatened with expulsion. Weld did not withdraw until the motion to expel him, which would have been nationally publicized, had been defeated.

=== The "seminary" at Cumminsville ===
About a dozen of the Lane Rebels, as they came to be called, established an informal seminary of their own in 1834–1835, in Cumminsville, Ohio. "We went out, not knowing whither we went. The Lord's hand was with us. Five miles from the seminary we found a deserted brick tavern, with many convenient rooms. Here we rallied. A gentleman of the vicinity offered us all necaessary fuel, a gentleman far off [Lewis Tappan] sent us a thousand dollars, and we set up a seminary of our own and became a law unto ourselves. George Whipple was competent in Hebrew, and William T. Allan in Greek. They were made professors in the intermediate state. It was desirable that we should remain near to Cincinnati for a season, as we were there teaching in evening schools for the colored people of that city."

A group of former students left Lane Seminary and lived four miles away in a village named Cumminsville. This group of students included William T. Allan, Huntington Lyman, John Tappan Pierce, Henry B. Stanton, and James A. Thome. These students lived, studied, and taught the local black community. The rebels also preached in local black and white churches. A few young men also joined the Cumminsville group who were prospective Lane students, but never attended the seminary. These three men that we know of are: Benjamin Foltz, Theodore J. Keep, and William Smith. They are considered by some scholars to be a part of the Lane rebels, though I do not formally include them in the group. Those individuals, along with the rest of the former Lane students at Cumminsville, attended Oberlin Collegiate Institute. Henry B. Stanton was one of the few at Cumminsville who did not attend Oberlin, instead, Stanton went to law school.

At Cumminsville, "the students continued their work in the black community. William T. Allan, Andrew Benton, Marius R. Robinson, Henry B. Stanton, and George Whipple taught in the Sabbath schools. John W. Alvord, Huntington Lyman, Henry B. Stanton, James A. Thome, and Samuel Wells gave lectures twice a week in the black community. The students also alternated in preaching at eight different churches, including two black churches. They helped support Augustus Wattles' teachers in schools, enlisted the cooperation of local black ministers, and kept Weld, now an anti-slavery agent, and Joshua Leavitt informed of local events."

This was the point at which the former Lane students came into contact with John J. Shipherd, founder of the new Oberlin Collegiate Institute, "a college in name only" that had been founded the previous year (1833). "The former Lane students literally took possession of the embryo institution."

=== The conditions of the Lane Rebels' enrollment at Oberlin ===
The students negotiated with Shipherd the installation of Asa Mahan, the Lane trustee who resigned, as Oberlin's president. Oberlin also agreed to hire Morgan, the discharged professor. The trustees would not have the power, as they did at Lane, to meddle in the affairs of professors and students. The most controversial condition insisted on by the Rebels was that Oberlin commit itself to accepting African-American students in general, and the very popular James Bradley in particular, equally. This was agreed to reluctantly, after a "dramatic" vote (4–4, tie broken by chair).

The Lane Rebels, with Weld at their head, could insist on these conditions because funding from the Tappans came with them. If the trustees did not agree they would lose this crucial funding, as well as Mahan, Finney, and Shipherd, who threatened to quit.

The conditions of the Rebels set limits, for the first time, on an American college's authority over students and faculty. They also were part of the shift in American antislavery efforts from colonization to abolition; many of the Rebels would become part of Oberlin's cadre of minister–abolitionists.

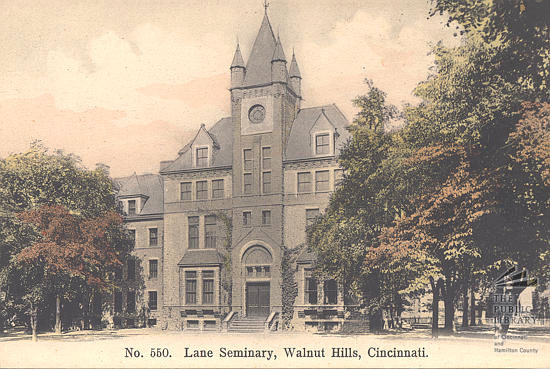
Postcard of Lane Seminary, Walnut Hills, Cincinnati. Late 19th century?

== The Seminary after 1834 ==
When the Rebels departed in October 1834, "they left behind them but two seminarians in a theological department that had boasted forty, and only five scholars of the sixty formerly enrolled for the literary curriculum."

"Of the several gloomy years that succeeded the abolition secession, I need only say, that the wonder is, that Lane did not perish. It had few students and little money." "The institution was disgraced and wrecked; it never recovered from the experience."

In 1837 "the seminary had no students", but Beecher went on a recruiting trip and persuaded some to enroll.

Following the slavery debates, Lane Seminary continued as a "New School" seminary, cooperating with Congregationalists and others in mission and education efforts and involved in social reform movements like abolition, temperance, and Sabbath legislation. The seminary admitted students from other denominations and pursued educational and evangelistic unity among Protestant churches in the West. In 1837 there were 41 students from 15 states, and 4 faculty: Beecher, Calvin Ellis Stowe, Thomas J. Biggs, and Baxter Dickinson.

After the Civil War, the New School and the Old School Presbyterians had reconciled, and Lane Seminary was reorganized along more conservative Presbyterian lines. In 1910, it became affiliated with the Presbyterian Seminary of the South, and the Seminary continued as a small but respected school, though financial pressures continued to increase. Following a brief period of growth in the 1920s, it became apparent that Lane could no longer survive as an independent school. In 1932 it suspended operations and transferred its library and other resources to McCormick Theological Seminary, in Chicago. While a permanent Board of Trustees for Lane Theological Seminary remained in service until the Seminary was legally merged out of existence in 2007, the faculty, library collections, and students were transferred to Chicago, and the last remnants of the Cincinnati campus, except for the house of president Lyman Beecher, were destroyed in 1956. A historical marker in front of an automobile dealership at 2820 Gilbert Ave. marks the site of the campus.

== Historical re-enactments ==
The Lane Debates have been re-enacted in recent years by historians from Yale University, the University of Connecticut, and Oberlin College.

== Media ==
A movie about the debates, Sons & Daughters of Thunder, was released in December 2019. It is based on a play by Earlene Hawley and Curtis Heeter.

== Archival material ==
Archival materials of Lane are located at the Presbyterian Historical Society in Philadelphia.

== Historical marker ==
Side A: The Lanes, Baptist merchants from New Orleans, and the Kempers, a Presbyterian family from Cincinnati, gave money and land respectively for Cincinnati's first manual labor theological seminary and high school, which opened in suburban Walnut Hills in 1829. The Reverend Lyman Beecher came from Boston as its first president. The president's house, now known as the Stowe House after Beecher's daughter Harriet Beecher Stowe, author of Uncle Tom's Cabin, still remains at Gilbert and Foraker. Lane Theological Seminary, bound by present day Gilbert, Chapel, Park, and Yale streets, continued to educate Presbyterian ministers until 1932, when it was merged with McCormick Theological Seminary in Chicago.

Side B: In the winter of 1834, the students of Lane Theological Seminary, including some southerners and one African-American former slave, organized an eighteen-night revival under the leadership of Theodore Dwight Weld. These antislavery debates over immediate abolition versus colonization effectively converted almost all the students to abolition. American newspapers publicized the debates, and women supporters, "the Cincinnati Sisters," organized local schools for African-American children. When the trustees prohibited the students from discussing controversial issues, most of the students withdrew, set up a seminary in exile in Cumminsville, and then moved it to Oberlin College. The Lane Seminary Debates marked the shift in American antislavery efforts from colonization to abolition, and the "Lane Rebels" became ministers, abolitionists, and social reformers across the country.

== Students who enrolled at Lane ==
24 of the 40 members of Lane's first theological class were from the Oneida Institute. So far as is known, none of Oneida's African-American students made the move. Those identified conclusively are the following. Those that left with the Lane Rebels (according to the table cited above) and enrolled at Oberlin are marked in bold.

- William T. Allan (1810–1882) did not study at Oneida. He met Weld when the latter stayed at his parents' house during his manual labor tour. He attended Centre College but moved to Lane, probably through Weld's influence. He graduated from Oberlin in 1836.
- **John Watson Alvord** (1807–1880), was one of the five students Weld enrolled to travel Ohio lecturing against slavery. Studied at Oneida; graduated from Oberlin; pastor in Connecticut and Massachusetts; superintendent of the schools of the Freedmen's Bureau, 1866–1870.
- George Bristol
- Charles P. Bush; Michigan politician
- Horace Bushnell
- **Amos Dresser**
- Alexander Duncan, not to be confused with Alexander Duncan (politician), from Cincinnati
- **Hiram Foote**
- Augustus Hopkins †1841
- Russell Jesse Judd
- John J. Miter
- **Joseph Hitchcock Payne**
- Ezra Abell Poole
- **Samuel Fuller Porter**
- **Charles Stewart Renshaw**
- Robert L. Stanton, worked in Lane's print shop
- Asa A. Stone, †1835 Stone published two lengthy letters reporting on Southern slavery.
- **Sereno Wright Streeter** (1810–1880) graduated from Oberlin and was ordained in 1836. After much organizing work and several ministerial positions, he was professor at Otterbein College from 1857 to 1860.
- **James A. Thome**, of Kentucky
- Calvin Waterbury
- Augustus Wattles
- Edward Weed. "There was a town gathering at Chillicothe on the same day of last week, when Mr. Weed arrived in town on some business; and being known as an abolitionist, some indignities were offered to him—such as shaving his horse, removing the wheels of his wagon, &c.; that Mr. Weed soon after left town, was followed by the mob, his wagon broken to pieces, his horse killed, and at length himself suspended to a tree by a rope of bark, until he was dead." (italics in original)
- Theodore Dwight Weld
- Samuel T. Wells, described as "student monitor-general" on Lane's farm
- **George Whipple** "abandoned his school in Kentucky to study theology and teach elementary courses at the seminary". Later he taught at Oberlin.
- **Hiram Wilson**

== Notable alumni ==
- Moses N. Adams, missionary to the Dakota people
- Edward H. Allen, Kansas City Mayor
- Henry Ward Beecher, 1837
- Jonathan Blanchard, abolitionist and founder of Wheaton College
- John Gregg Fee, abolitionist and founder of Berea College
- James C. White

== See also ==
- Walnut Hills United Presbyterian Church
