= Rockville, Ohio =

Unincorporated community in Ohio, U.S.

Coordinates: 38°37′2″N 83°16′18″W

Rockville is an unincorporated community in Adams County, in the U.S. state of Ohio.

== History ==
Rockville was laid out in 1830, and named for the quarries near the original town site.
