= Cottage Bible =

1824 study Bible compiled by Thomas Williams

The Cottage Bible And Family Expositor: Containing The Old And New Testaments, With Practical Expositions And Explanatory Notes was an 1824 study Bible, compiled by Thomas Williams (1755–1839).

The Cottage Bible printed text deemed unsuitable for family reading in smaller type, and exchanged "some phrases also exceptionable to females" for others "more suitable to the present state of our language and of society". The Quarterly Theological Review and Ecclesiastical Record objected to this as a "violation of the purity of the sacred text". The American edition of 1833 printed the whole text in uniform type.
