= Bates (surname) =

Bates is a common surname of English origin, derived from the name Bartholomew. The name could also originate from the Old English bat, meaning "boat", to identify a person whose occupation was boatman. Another origin is that which means "lush pasture", describing someone who lived near such a place.

At the time of the British Census of 1881, the relative frequency of the surname Bates was highest in Buckinghamshire (5.2 times the British average), followed by Leicestershire, Bedfordshire, Northamptonshire, Derbyshire, Staffordshire, Warwickshire, Huntingdonshire, Cambridgeshire and Oxfordshire.

== Notable people ==
=== A–D ===
- Aaron Bates (born 1984), American baseball player and coach
- Alan Bates (disambiguation), multiple people
  - Alan Bates (1934–2003), British actor
- Albert Bates (born 1947), U.S. environmentalist
- Allie Bates (born 1957), U.S. magazine writer
- Alta Bates (1879–1955), American nurse anesthetist and founder of Alta Bates Hospital
- Angelique Bates (born 1980), American actress
- Anna Haining Bates (1846–1888), Canadian woman who stood 2.41 m (7 ft 11 in)
- Anne Winship Bates (1896–1977), American heiress and philanthropist
- Arlo Bates (1850–1918), author and professor at Massachusetts Institute of Technology
- Arthur Laban Bates (1859–1934), U.S. Representative from Massachusetts, 1901–1913
- Audrey Bates (1922–2001), Welsh international in four sports
- Audrey Bates (programmer) (1928–2014), British-American computer programmer
- Barbara Bates (1925–1969), U.S. actress and singer
- Barrie Bates (born 1969), Welsh darts player
- Benjamin Bates (disambiguation), multiple people
  - Benjamin Bates IV (1808–1878), philanthropist, founder of Bates College in Lewiston, Maine
- Bill Bates (born 1961), U.S. player of American football
- Billy Bates (1855–1900), English cricketer
- Blanche Bates (1873–1941), American stage actress
- Blaster Bates (1923–2006), British demolition expert
- Bob Bates (musician) (1923–1981), first bassist of The Dave Brubeck Quartet, 1951–58
- Bob Bates (born 1953), U.S. game designer
- Brenden Bates (born 1999), American football player
- Carl S. Bates (1884–1956), American aviation pioneer
- Cary Bates (born 1948), American comic book writer
- Cat Bates (born 1986), child model for Jamie Wyeth and younger brother of Orca Bates
- Charles Bates (disambiguation), multiple people
- Charlotte Fiske Bates (1838–1916), American author
- Cheri Jo Bates (1948–1966), American murder victim
- Chic Bates (1949–2025), English football player and manager
- Clara Doty Bates (1838–1895), American author
- Clara Nettie Bates (1876–1966), American editor, writer, clubwoman
- Clayton Peg Leg Bates (1907–1998), American entertainer
- Daisy Bates (disambiguation), multiple people
  - Daisy Bates (civil rights activist) (Daisy Lee Gatson Bates, 1914–1999), U.S. civil rights activist
  - Daisy Bates (Australia) (Daisy May Bates, 1859–1951), Australian journalist
- David Bates (disambiguation), multiple people
  - David Bates (historian) (born 1945), British historian, writer of books about William I of England and Odo of Bayeux
  - David Bates (physicist) (1916–1994), Irish physicist, winner of the 1970 Hughes Medal
  - David Bates (poet) (1809–1870), U.S. poet
- Dick Bates (born 1945), Major League Baseball pitcher
- D'Wayne Bates (born 1975), U.S. player of American football
- Dustin Bates (born 1986) Starset singer

=== E–J ===
- Edward Bates (1793–1869), U.S. jurist and politician, candidate for US president, 1860, and US Attorney General, 1861–1864
- Elizabeth Bates (1947–2003), Professor of psychology and cognitive science at the University of California, San Diego
- Emma Bates (disambiguation), multiple people
- Emily Bates (born 1995), Australian rules footballer
- Emoni Bates (born 2004), American basketball player
- Erastus Newton Bates (1828–1898), American politician
- Evan Bates (born 1989), American ice dancer
- Frank Amasa Bates (1858–1915), American author, naturalist and ornithologist
- Frederick Bates (disambiguation), several people
- George Joseph Bates (1891–1949), U.S. Representative from Massachusetts, 1937–49
- George Latimer Bates (1863–1940), American naturalist
- Gilbert Bates (1836–1917), Wisconsin Civil War veteran
- Gladys Noel Bates (1920–2010), American civil rights pioneer and teacher
- Granville Bates (1882–1940), American actor
- Guy Bates (born 1985), English footballer
- H. E. Bates (Herbert Ernest Bates, 1905–1974), English writer and author
- Harriet Bates (1856–1886), American writer
- Harry Bates (disambiguation), multiple people
  - Harry Bates (sculptor) (1850–1899), British sculptor
  - Harry Bates (author) (1900–1981), U.S. science fiction writer
- Henry Bates (disambiguation), multiple people
  - Henry Bates (politician), U.S. politician
  - Henry Moore Bates (1869–1949), American lawyer and president of the Order of the Coif
  - Henry Walter Bates (1825–1892), British zoologist
  - Henry Bates (British Army officer) (1813–1893), British general
- Isaac Chapman Bates (1779–1845), U.S. Representative, 1827–35, and U.S. Senator 1841–45, from Massachusetts
- James Bates (disambiguation), one of several people
- Jamie Bates (born 1989), English welterweight kickboxer
- Jamie Bates (footballer) (born 1968), English footballer
- Jason Bates (born 1971), U.S. professional baseball player
- Jeanne Bates (1918–2007), U.S. actress
- Jeff Bates (born 1963), U.S. country singer
- Jeff Bates (technologist) (born 1976), U.S. businessman
- Jennifer Bates (labor activist), American labor organizer
- Jeremy Bates (disambiguation), multiple people
  - Jeremy Bates (American football) (born 1976), American football coach
  - Jeremy Bates (boxer) (born 1974), American boxer
  - Jeremy Bates (tennis) (born 1962), British tennis player
- Jessie Bates (born 1997), American football player
- Jim Bates (disambiguation), multiple people
  - Jim Bates (politician) (born 1941), U.S. Representative from California, 1983–91
  - Jim Bates (American football) (born 1946), U.S. coach of American football
- John Bates (disambiguation), multiple people
  - Johnny Bates (baseball) (1882–1949), baseball player
- Joseph Bates (disambiguation), multiple people
  - Joseph E. Bates (1837–1900), 19th-century mayor of Denver, Colorado
  - Joseph Bates (Adventist) (1792–1872), U.S. Adventist and health reformist
- Josephine White Bates (1862–1934), Canadian-born American author
- Joshua Bates (disambiguation), multiple people
  - Joshua Bates (educator) (1776–1854), American minister and teacher
  - Joshua Bates (financier) (1788–1864), benefactor of Boston Public Library
  - Joshua Hall Bates (1817–1908), American Civil War general
- Juanita Breckenridge Bates (1860–1946), American Congregationalist minister and suffragette

=== K–R ===
- Katharine Lee Bates (1859–1929), U.S. poet
- Kathy Bates (born 1948), U.S. actor
- Ken Bates (Kenneth William Bates, born 1931), British businessman and football club owner/chairman
- Lindon Wallace Bates (1858–1924), American civil engineer who designed the "three-lakes" of the Panama Canal
- L. C. Bates (1904–1980), African-American civil rights activist
- Lefty Bates (1920–2007), American Chicago blues guitarist
- Leon Bates (pianist) (born 1949), American pianist
- Leon Bates (labor leader) (1899–1972), American UAW union organizer
- Leonard Bates (1895–1971), English cricketer
- Madeleine Bates (born c. 1948), American computational linguistics researcher
- Margret Holmes Bates (1844–1927), American author
- Mario Bates (born 1973), U.S. player of American football
- Marston Bates (1906–1974), U.S. zoologist
- Martha E. Cram Bates (1839–1905), writer, journalist, newspaper editor
- Martin Bates (disambiguation), multiple people
  - Martin Van Buren Bates (1837–1919), U.S. politician
  - Martin W. Bates (1786–1869), U.S. Senator from Delaware
- Mason Bates (born 1977), American composer
- Matthew Bates (born 1986), English footballer
- Maxwell Bates (1906–1980), Canadian architect and artist
- Michael Bates (disambiguation), one of several people
- Mick Bates (disambiguation), one of several people
- Morris Bates (1864–1905), English footballer
- Nancy Bates (statistician), statistician with the US Census
- Nicholas James Bates (born 1962), British musician known as Nick Rhodes
- Orca Bates (born 1976), child model for Jamie Wyeth
- Paddy Roy Bates (1921–2012), pirate radio broadcaster and Sealand founder
- Patricia Martin Bates (born 1927), Canadian artist
- Paul L. Bates (1908–1995), Colonel, United States Army
- Phil Bates (born 1953), guitarist and vocalist with the Orchestra (former members of ELO and ELO Part II)
- Ralph Bates (writer) (1899–2000), English writer
- Ralph Bates (1940–1991), English actor
- Richard Dawson Bates (1876–1949), Northern Irish politician
- Robert Bates (disambiguation), several people
- Roger Bates (born 1947), American bridge player
- Ronald Bates (1932–1986), New York City Ballet production stage manager
- Ryan Bates (born 1997), American football player

=== S–Z ===
- Samuel Penniman Bates (1827–1902), American educator
- Sandra Bates, director of the Ensemble Theatre in Sydney, Australia, from 1986 to 2015
- Sara Bates (born 1944), U.S. artist
- Shawn Bates (born 1975), U.S. hockey player
- Sidney Bates (1921–1944), British soldier
- Simon Bates (born 1946), British radio presenter
- Stuart 'Pinkie' Bates, organ/synthesizer player
- Stephen Bates (born 1992), Australian politician
- Stephen Bates (sheriff) (1842–1907), American law enforcement officer
- Stephen Bates Baltes (1953–2003), American musical director for "Barney and the Backyard Gang" (1988–89)
- Suzie Bates (born 1987), New Zealand cricketer
- Ted Bates (footballer) (1918–2003), English footballer
- Thomas Bates (1567–1606), English servant, conspirator in the Gunpowder Plot of 1605
- Thomas Herbert Bates (1873–1954), New Zealand architect
- Tom Bates (born 1938), U.S. politician
- Tyler Bates (born 1965), U.S. musician
- Tryphosa Bates-Batcheller (1876–1952), U.S. singer
- William Bates (disambiguation), multiple people
  - William Henry Bates (1917–1969), U.S. Representative from Massachusetts, 1949–70
  - William Bates (physician) (1860–1931), American ophthalmologist, creator of the "Bates Method for Better Eyesight"
- Willis Bates (1880–1939), American college sports coach

=== Fictional characters ===
- Bates (Stargate), a character in Stargate
- Kid Marvelman, a Marvel Comics character whose original name was Johnny Bates
- Eric, U.S. and Fancy Bates, characters in the 1982 film The Toy
- John Bates, a character from Downton Abbey, married to Anna
- Anna Bates, a character from Downton Abbey, married to John
- Joshua T. Bates, a character of Susan Shreve
- Nigel Bates, a character from the soap opera EastEnders
- Norman Bates, a character from the 1960 film Psycho
- Paul Bates, a character in the 2011 fantasy comedy movie Midnight in Paris
- Tom, Amy, and Pattie Bates, characters in Dennis Potter's play Brimstone and Treacle

== See also ==
- Bates (disambiguation)
