= Henry Bates =

Henry Bates is the name of:

- Henry Walter Bates (1825–1892), English naturalist and explorer
- Henry Bates (cricketer) (1880–1942), English cricketer
- Henry Bates (politician), American politician in the 1850s who was impeached
- Henry C. Bates (1843–1909), American lawyer and politician
- Henry Moore Bates (1869–1949), American lawyer and dean of the University of Michigan Law School
- Henry Bates (British Army officer) (1813–1893), British general
- Henry M. Bates (1808–1865), American banker and politician

== See also ==
- Harry Bates (disambiguation)
- Henry Bates Fitz (1817–1880), Australian politician
- Henry Bates Grubb (1774–1823), American businessman
- Henry Bates Joel (1875–1922), British landscape painter
