= Bates School =

Bates School may refer to:

== United States ==
- Bates School (Bates, Arkansas), in the List of RHPs in AR
- Bates College, a private college in Lewiston, Maine
- Wiley H. Bates High School, Annapolis, MD, listed on the NRHP in Maryland
- Joshua Bates School, Boston, MA
