= James Bate =

James Bate may refer to:

- James Bate (writer) (1703–1775), English scholar and writer
- James Bate (actor) (1945–1992), British television, film and stage actor

== See also ==
- James Bates (disambiguation)
