= General Bates =

General Bates may refer to:

- Charles Loftus Bates (1863–1951), British Army brigadier general
- Erastus Newton Bates (1828–1898), Union Army brevet brigadier general
- Henry Bates (British Army officer) (1813–1893), British Army general
- John C. Bates (1842–1919), U.S. Army lieutenant general
- Joshua Hall Bates (1817–1908), Ohio State Militia brigadier general in the American Civil War
