= David Bates =

David Bates may refer to:

- David Bates (English artist) (1840–1921), English landscape artist
- David Bates (American artist) (born 1952), American modernist artist
- David Bates (footballer) (born 1996), Scottish footballer
- David Bates (historian) (born 1945), British historian and writer
- David Bates (physicist) (1916–1994), Northern Irish mathematician and physicist
- David Bates (poet) (1809–1870), American poet
- David Bates (rugby league) (born 1980), Irish rugby league footballer
- David Bates (swimmer) (born 1976), Australian open water swimmer
- David Bates (Rhode Island politician) (1941–2017), American politician
- David Bates (New Hampshire politician), American politician
- David W. Bates (born 1957), American-born physician, biomedical informatician and professor
