= John Bate =

John Bate may refer to:

- John Bate (theologian) (died 1429), English or Welsh theologian and philosopher
- John Bate (politician), 1959 and 1962 Manitoba general election
- John Bate (railway engineer), former chief engineer of the Talyllyn Railway

== See also ==
- John Bate Cardale (1802–1877), English religious leader
- John Bates (disambiguation)
