= General Hope =

General Hope may refer to:

- Alexander Hope (British Army officer) (1769–1837), British Army general
- Charles Hope (British Army officer) (1768–1828), British Army general
- James Archibald Hope (1786–1871), British Army general
- John Hope (British Army officer, born 1765) (1765–1836), British Army lieutenant general
- John Bruce Hope (c. 1684–1766), British Army lieutenant general
- John Hope, 4th Earl of Hopetoun (1765–1823), British Army general
- Sir William Hope, 14th Baronet (1819–1898), British Army general
