= Frederic Vinton (bibliographer) =

American bibliographer (1817–1890)

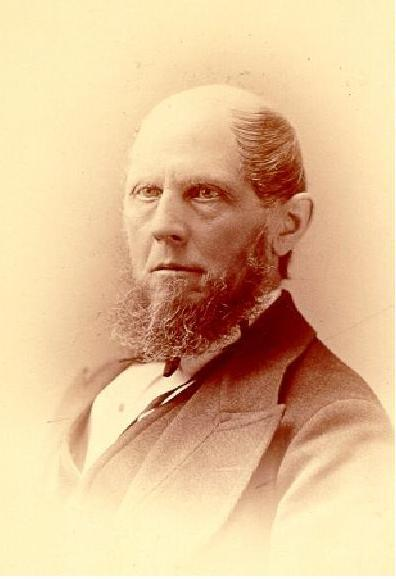
- Born: October 9, 1817; Boston
- Died: January 1, 1890 (aged 72)
- Alma mater: Amherst College
- Occupation: Librarian

Frederic Vinton (October 9, 1817 – January 1, 1890) was an American bibliographer. He graduated from Amherst in 1837, and studied theology at Andover and New Haven, but was never ordained.

After training himself in a private library during five years, he entered the service of the Boston Public Library in 1856 as first assistant. The library at the time was located in its new building on Boylston Street, with the 30,000 volumes that had been given by Joshua Bates. He organized the arrangement that was to persist for many years. He assisted in preparing the Index to the Catalogue of Books in the Bates Hall (1861) and the First Supplement to it (1866). He moved to Washington, in January 1865, to become first assistant in the Library of Congress, and held the post eight years. He there prepared six annual supplements to the Alphabetical Catalogue of the Library of Congress and the Index of Subjects (2 vols., Washington, 1869). In 1873, he became librarian of Princeton College, and printed the Subject Catalogue (New York, 1884) of that library.
