= Joshua Bates =

Joshua Bates may refer to:

- Joshua Bates (educator) (1776–1854), American educator and clergyman
- Joshua Bates (financier) (1788–1864), American international financier
- Joshua Hall Bates (1817–1908), lawyer, politician, and general in the Union Army
- Joshua T. Bates, a fictional character from the series of books
- Joshua Bates School, a school in Boston, Massachusetts
- Josh Bates (speedway rider) (born 1996), British motorcycle speedway rider
- Joshua Barton Bates (1824–1892), justice of the Supreme Court of Missouri
