= Lindon Bates Jr. =

American politician

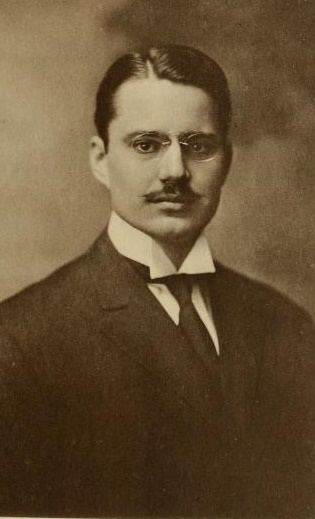
- Born: July 17, 1883; Portland, Oregon
- Died: May 7, 1915 (aged 31); Celtic Sea
- Education: Harrow School; Sheffield Scientific School; Yale University
- Occupations: Engineer, politician
- Years active: 1902-1915

Lindon Wallace Bates Jr. (July 17, 1883 – May 7, 1915) was an American engineer and politician from New York who died on the Lusitania.

== Life ==
Bates was born on July 17, 1883, in Portland, Oregon, the son of engineer Lindon Wallace Bates and Josephine White. His paternal grandfather, William Wallace Bates, was the United States Commissioner of Navigation from 1889 to 1892.

Bates attended the Harrow School. He then went to the Sheffield Scientific School at Yale University, graduating from there in 1902 and later took a post-graduate course. He then began working as an engineer for the New York Barge Canal and as secretary of the United States Engineering Company. He also supervised grade raising in Galveston, Texas, to protect it from flooding. He travelled extensively to examine and supervise construction all over the world. He also wrote a number of books on technical, economic, and sociological subjects.

In 1908, Bates was elected to the New York State Assembly as a Republican, representing the New York County 29th District. He served in the Assembly in 1909 and 1910. In the 1912 United States House of Representatives election, he was a candidate the New York's 17th congressional district as a Progressive and Independence League, but lost to John F. Carew. He ran again in the 1914 United States House of Representatives election for the same district, this time under the Republican, Progressive, and Independence League ticket, but he lost to Carew again.

In 1909, Bates was appointed a member of the General Commission of Water Supply by Mayor McClellan. He was also a member of the National Conservation Congress and vice president of the Bates Engineering Company of New York City. He was a consulting engineer for a number of companies, including the Western Engineering Corporation, the Denver Mining Investment Company, the Laguintos Oil Company, the Maikop Areas, and the Trinidad Cedros Oil Company. He was a member of the Western Society of Engineers, the Société Belge des Ingénieurs et des Industriels, and the American Society of Civil Engineers.

Bates was one of the original 32 founders of the New York Young Republican Club.

Bates was unmarried. He was a trustee of the Fifth Avenue Presbyterian Church.

When World War I broke out, Bates was involved in organizing relief efforts. His father was vice chairman of the American Commission for Relief in Belgium, while he was a member of the executive committee of the London board. In 1915, he was planning on going to Belgium to help the commission and boarded the RMS Lusitania, where he was a first class passenger. He was on deck with Amy Lea Pearl, a friend of his, when the ship was struck. He spent the last moments prior to the ship sinking helping Amy and her husband Warren find their children. He died with the ship on May 7, 1915. His body was later recovered. He was buried in the Bates Family Cemetery in Hancock, Massachusetts.

New York State Assembly
| Preceded by Walter H. Liebmann | New York State Assembly; New York County, 29th District; 1909-1910 | Succeeded by Harold J. Friedman |
