= Prakasha amariformis =

Scientific classification
- Domain: Eukaryota
- Kingdom: Animalia
- Phylum: Arthropoda
- Class: Insecta
- Order: Coleoptera
- Suborder: Adephaga
- Family: Carabidae
- Subfamily: Harpalinae
- Tribe: Harpalini
- Subtribe: Harpalina
- Genus: Prakasha; Andrewes, 1919
- Species: P. amariformis

Binomial name
- Prakasha amariformis (Bates, 1892)

Species of beetle

Prakasha amariformis is a species of harp beetle in the family Carabidae, the only species in the genus Prakasha. It is found in Afghanistan, Bhutan, India, Myanmar, Nepal, and Pakistan.
