= Martin Bates =

Martin Bates may refer to:

- Martin Van Buren Bates (1837–1919), American giant
- Martin W. Bates (1786–1869), U.S. Senator from Delaware

== See also ==
- Martin Bate, British D.J.
