= Frederick Bates =

Frederick Bates may refer to:

- Frederick Bates (politician) (1777–1825), American politician
- Frederick Bates (cricketer) (1899–1969), English cricketer
- Frederick Bates (entomologist) (1829–1903), English entomologist
