= James Bate (writer) =

English scholar and writer

James Bate (1703–1775) was an English scholar and writer.

== Life ==
Bate, the elder brother of Julius Bate, was the son of the Rev. Richard Bate, vicar of Chilham and rector of Wareham. He was born at Boughton Malherbe in Kent in 1703. His education was received at the King's School, Canterbury, and at Corpus Christi College, Cambridge, where he entered 4 July 1720, with Mr. Denne for his tutor. He passed B.A. 1723, and was elected fellow shortly after; but he accepted later from the Bishop of Ely a fellowship in St John's College. He commenced M.A. in 1727.

In 1730 Bate became moderator of the university, and in 1731 one of the taxers. Bate accompanied Horace Walpole as chaplain when the latter went to Paris as ambassador. Upon his return home he was presented to the good living of St. Paul's, Deptford, on 23 June 1731, where he studied hard. He had a solid command of Hebrew, but his research and speculations bore little fruit.

Bate died in 1775. The funeral sermon, preached by the Rev. Colin Milne at St. Paul's, Deptford, was published.

== Works ==
Bate wrote:

- An Address to his Parishioners on the Rebellion of 1745.
- Infidelity scourged, or Christianity vindicated against Chubb, &c. (1746).
- An Essay towards a Rationale of the literal Doctrine of Original Sin … occasioned by some of Dr. Middleton's Writings (1752; 2nd ed. 1766).

There are also occasional sermons, with some scholarly notes introduced.
