= Bates, Arkansas =

Unincorporated community in Arkansas, US

Bates
- Unincorporated community
- Location within Arkansas Location within the United States
- Coordinates: 34°54′29″N 94°23′13″W
- Country: United States
- State: Arkansas
- County: Scott
- Elevation: 623 ft (190 m)
- Time zone: UTC-6 (Central (CST))
  - Summer (DST): UTC-5 (CDT)
- Area code: 479
- GNIS feature ID: 70534

Bates is an unincorporated community in Scott County, Arkansas, United States. It is the location or nearest community of Bates School, at 1074 Bates School Rd., which is listed on the U.S. National Register of Historic Places.

== History ==
Settlers appeared in the area in the late 1820s, with the eponym, Thompson G. Bates Sr., arriving in the 1840s. The Bates post office began in 1902 soon after the railroad was extended to that point. The town of Bates and Bates School District were established in 1907.
