= Frederick Bates (entomologist) =

British brewer and naturalist (1829–1903)

- Born: 18 November 1829; Leicester, England
- Died: 6 October 1903 (aged 73); Chiswick, England

Frederick Bates (18 November 1829 – 6 October 1903) was a British brewer and entomologist. He specialized in beetles and is known for his substantial collection of Tenebrionoidea (Heteromera). Frederick DuCane Godman purchased this collection of 22,390 specimens; the collection was subsequently sold to the Natural History Museum, London in 1881 and 1897. Until the 1890s, he collected beetle specimens from Great Britain; this collection was later owned by Basil Samuel Williams (nephew of Benjamin Samuel Williams). Bates managed the Eagle Brewery in Leicester before co-founding the Leicester Brewing & Malting Co. in June 1890.

Bates was born in Leicester, on 18 November 1829, and died in Chiswick, on 6 October 1903, aged 73. His eldest brother was Henry Walter Bates.

== Taxonomy ==
- Prakasha amariformis (1892)
