= Jeremy Bates =

Jeremy Bates may refer to:

- Jeremy Bates (American football) (born 1976), American football coach
- Jeremy Bates (boxer) (born 1974), American boxer
- Jeremy Bates (tennis) (born 1962), British tennis player
- Jeremy Bates (author) (born 1978), Canadian/Australian author
