= Alan Bates (disambiguation) =

Alan Bates (1934–2003) was a British actor of stage, screen, and television.

Alan Bates may also refer to:

- Alan Bates (politician) (1945–2016), doctor and a Democratic politician from the U.S. state of Oregon
- Alan Bates (rugby league) (born 1944), British rugby league footballer
- Alan Bates (subpostmaster) (born 1954), campaigner for the Justice for Subpostmasters Alliance (JFSA) in the British Post Office scandal
