= John Bate (theologian) =

English or Welsh theologian (died 1429)

John Bate (died 1429) was an English or Welsh theologian and philosopher.

== Life ==
Bate was, according to Leland's account, born west of the River Severn (inter Transabrinos), but seems to have been brought up in the Carmelite monastery at York, where his progress in learning was so great that he was dispatched to complete his studies at Oxford. Philosophy and theology seem to have divided his attention, and on asking his master's degree in both these subjects he proceeded to add to his reputation by authorship. He was acknowledged to be an authority in his own university and the news of his acquirements soon spread abroad. His name became known to the heads of his order and at last his fellow Carmelites of York elected him their prior.

It was probably somewhat earlier than this that he was ordained sub-deacon and deacon in March and May 1415 by Clifford, Bishop of London. Bate appears to have continued in his new office until February 1429, when he died ‘weighed down by a violent disease.’ According to John Bale, Thomas Netter of Walden spoke of him with praise.

When Bate died he was buried at York, where his tomb seems to have been extant in the days of Bale, who quotes one verse from the Latin epitaph inscribed upon it: Bati doctoris hæc condit petra cadaver.

== Works ==
The main works of Bate whose titles have survived are treatises on the ‘Parts of Speech,’ on Porphyry's ‘Universals,’ and on Aristotle's ‘Ethics.’ Other works were on Aristotle, and on Gilbert de la Porée's Sex Prædicamenta.’

Bate was a Greek scholar; but Bale claimed that Bate devoted his talents to propping up the blasphemies of the Antichrist and disseminating evil dogmas.
