= Nancy Bates (statistician) =

American census statistician

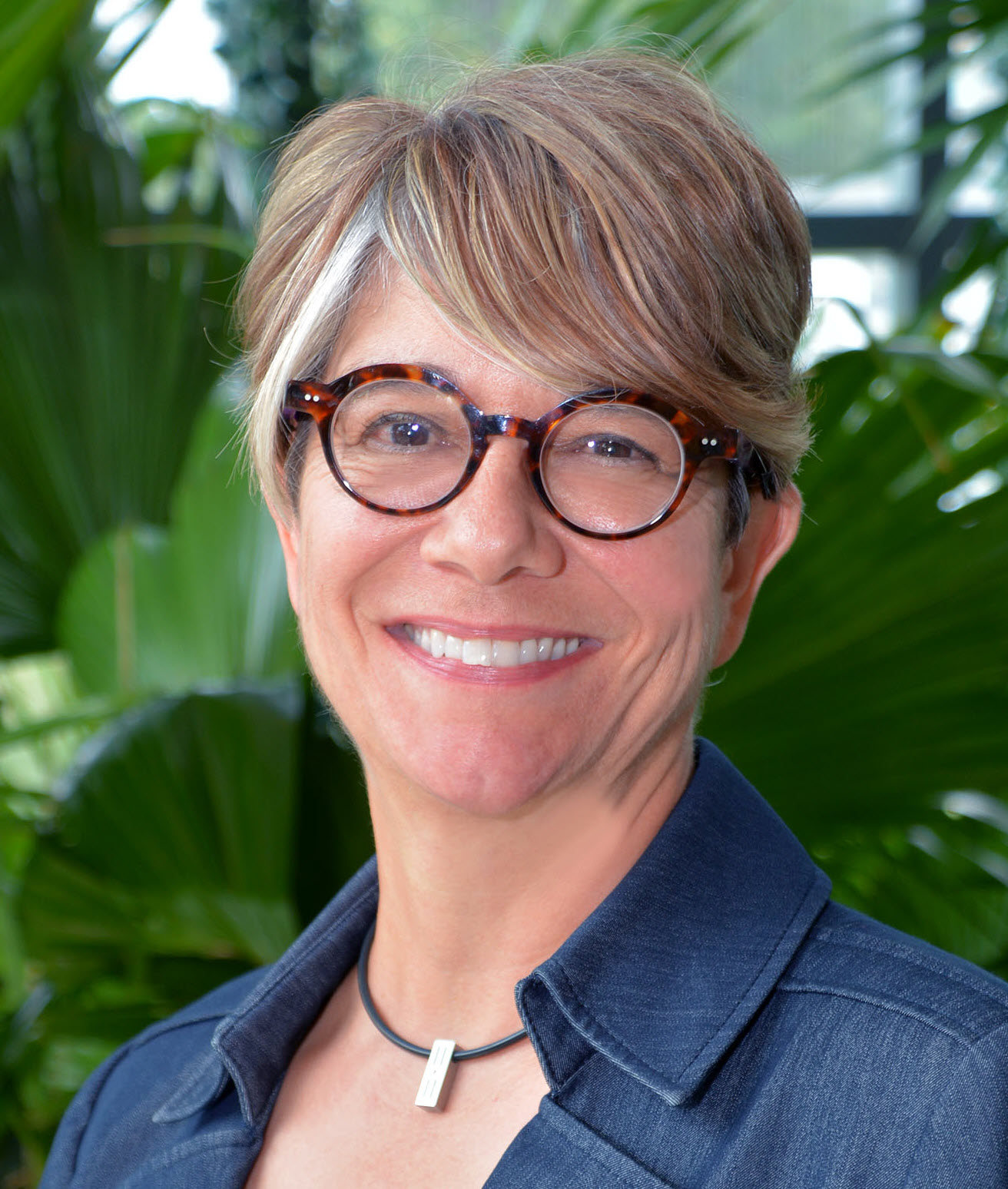
- Education: University of Oklahoma
- Occupation: Statistician

Nancy A. Bates is a retired statistician who served as a senior researcher at the United States Census Bureau. Bates earned bachelor's and master's degrees from the University of Oklahoma in 1985 and 1987, and began working for the census bureau in 1988.

In 2013 the University of Oklahoma named her as a Distinguished Alumna. In 2014 she was elected as a Fellow of the American Statistical Association "for outstanding contributions to the federal statistical system in survey methodology; for improving the measurement of same-sex couples in federal surveys; for leadership in the census to increase response rates in hard-to-count populations; and for outstanding service to the profession." Bates is past president of the Washington Statistical Society and founder of the Delta Mike chapter of the League of Lady Statisticians. In 2019 Bates was awarded the American Association for Public Opinion Research Public Service Award.
