= Lindon Wallace Bates =

American civil engineer

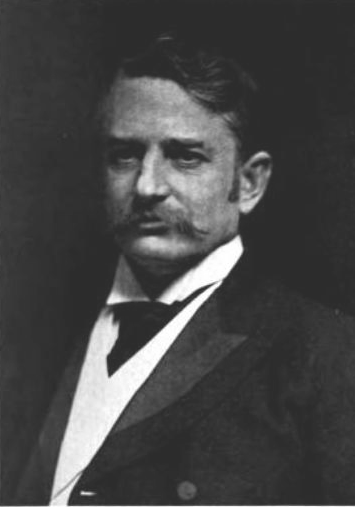
- Born: November 19, 1858; Marshfield, Vermont
- Died: April 22, 1924 (aged 65); London, England
- Education: Yale College
- Occupation: Civil engineer
- Spouse: Josephine White (m. 1881)
- Children: 2

Lindon Wallace Bates (1858–1924) was an American civil engineer.

== Early years and education ==
Bates was born at Marshfield, Vermont on November 19, 1858, and educated at Yale College.

== Career ==
After the completion of engineering studies he was appointed assistant engineer for the Northern Pacific and Oregon Pacific railways, and subsequently was contracting engineer or manager of a number of important contracts in connection with the building of transcontinental railways. His advisory services were employed by the governments of Belgium, Great Britain, and Russia in such large undertakings as the improvement of the port of Antwerp, the enlargement of the Suez Canal, and the increasing of Black Sea harbor efficiency. For the authorities of Queensland, South Australia, and India he designed a number of harbors and planned the regulation of several rivers. A scheme for the improvement of the port of Shanghai was also prepared by him, working in cooperation with other engineers of international reputation.

In the United States one of Bates's big contracts was the raising of the grade of Galveston after the flood there, and it was he who designed the "three-lake" plan for the Panama Canal. In 1900 the French government conferred on him a Grand Prix and decoration for "distinguished services to science"; and he was chosen to membership in various foreign as well as American engineering societies. He wrote:

- The Navigation Interests of Nations in Ports and Waterways (1900; French translation, 1900)
- The Panama Canal (1905)
- Retrieval at Panama (1907)

Bates was chairman of the Engineering Committee of the Submarine Defense Association in 1917.

== Personal life ==
Bates married Josephine White in Portland, Oregon on April 6, 1881, and they had two sons. One was Lindon Wallace Bates, Jr. (1883–1915), a renowned engineer who wrote several books on technical and economic subjects and perished in the sinking of the RMS Lusitania.

Lindon Wallace Bates died at London on April 22, 1924.
