= John Bates =

John Bates may refer to:

== Sportspeople ==
- John Bates (American football) (born 1997), American football player
- John Bates (baseball) (1868–1919), American baseball player
- Johnny Bates (baseball) (1882–1949), American baseball player
- John Bates (basketball) (1938–2015), American college basketball coach

== Other people ==
- John Bates (technology executive), British computer scientist and businessman
- John Bates (designer) (1935–2022), English fashion designer
- John C. Bates (1842–1919), U.S. general and army chief of staff 1906
- John L. Bates (1859–1946), U.S. political figure and governor of Massachusetts 1903–1905
- John D. Bates (born 1946), federal judge appointed by George W. Bush
- John Bates (rector), eighteenth-century Senior Wrangler; see List of Wranglers of the University of Cambridge
- Big John Bates, Canadian guitarist and singer
- John Bates (neurophysiologist) (1918–1993), English neurophysiologist
- John Grenville Bates (1880–1944), co-founder of the American Kennel Club

== Fictional characters ==
- John Bates, a character from the period drama soap opera Downton Abbey
- Johnny Bates, alter ego of Kid Marvelman

== See also ==
- John Bates Clark (1847–1938), American economist
- John Bates Thurston (1836–1897), British colonial in Fiji
- Jonathan Bates (1939–2008), English sound editor
- Jack Bates (born 2001), English rugby union player
- Jackie Bates (born 1986), American football player
- John Bate (disambiguation)
