= Harry Bates =

Harry Bates may refer to:

- Harry Bates (sculptor) (1850–1899), English sculptor
- Harry C. Bates (1882–1969), American labor union leader
- Harry Bates (footballer) (1890–after 1912), English footballer
- Harry Bates (writer) (1900–1981), American science fiction editor and writer
- Harry Bates (priest) (1912–1980), English archdeacon of Lindisfarne
- Harry Bates (architect) (1927–2022). American architect
- Harry Bates (rally driver) (born 1995), Australian rally driver
- Harry Bates (Coronation Street), fictional character on British television

== See also ==
- Harry Bates Thayer (1858–1936), American electrical and telephone businessman
- Henry Bates (disambiguation)
