= Robert Bates =

Robert Bates may refer to:

- Robert Makin Bates, partner in the Strahan, Paul & Bates bank which collapsed in 1855
- Bob Bates (born 1953), American computer game designer
- Bob Bates (musician) (1923–1981), musician in the 1950s Dave Brubeck Quartet
- Robert Bates (political scientist) (born 1942), professor of government at Harvard University
- Robert Bates (mountaineer) (1911–2007), American mountaineer and author
- Robert Bates (loyalist) (1948–1997), Ulster loyalist, member Shankill Butchers gang
- Robert B. Bates (1789–1841), Speaker of the Vermont House of Representatives
- Robert C. Bates, Tulsa deputy convicted for the shooting of Eric Harris
- Robert Charles Bates (1869–1950), African-American architect, teacher, and textbook author
- Robert John Bates (born 1946), Australian botanist
