= Charles Bates =

Charles or Charlie Bates may refer to:

- Charles Bates (American football) (born c. 1934), American football coach
- Charles Bates (actor) (1934–2023), American child actor
- Charles Loftus Bates (1871–1946), British Army officer
- Charles J. Bates (1930–2006), American food scientist
- Charles W. Bates (1879–1929), American architect
- Charlie Bates (footballer) (Charles Bates, 1889–1937), English footballer
- Charlie Bates (baseball) (Charles William Bates, 1907–1980), American Major League Baseball outfielder

In fiction:

- Charley Bates, character from Charles Dickens' Oliver Twist
