= Josephine White Bates =

American novelist

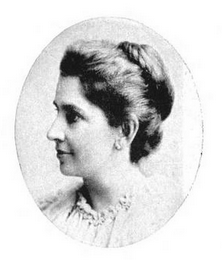
- Born: Josephine White; 8 July 1857; Portage-du-Fort, Canada East
- Died: 20 October 1934 (aged 72); Yorktown, New York, U.S.
- Citizenship: Canadian, American (after marriage)
- Education: Lake Forest College
- Occupation: Author
- Spouse: Lindon Wallace Bates (m. 1881)
- Children: Lindon Bates, Jr.
- Writing career
- Pen name: Mrs. E. Lindon Bates
- Language: English

Josephine White Bates (8 July 1862 – 20 October 1934) was a Canadian-American author who preferred to use her married name Mrs. E. Lindon Bates. She was the author of several works including A Blind Lead (1886), Bunch-Grass Stories (1892), and Mercury Poisoning in the Industries of New York City and Vicinity (1912).

== Early years and education ==
Josephine White was born 8 July 1857 at Portage-du-Fort, Canada East near Ottawa, Canada West, the daughter of George E. and Mary White. She was a student in Lake Forest, Illinois, and at the Lake Forest College, 1876–80.

== Career ==
She married Lindon Wallace Bates (born 1858), a hydraulic engineer, of New York City, on April 6, 1881, becoming a U.S. citizen by marriage. The couple lived in Portland, Oregon for a number of years. She was active in the Preparedness Movement; in 1916, she published a pamphlet "Keep America Safe". In 1908, she became a member of the Lyceum Club, having been sponsored by Lou Henry Hoover. She was also a member of Colony (New York); as well as Fortnightly, and Friday (Chicago). Bates visited with Herbert Hoover and his wife at their Red House in London for several weeks in 1911.

== Personal life ==
Bates' summer home was at Lebanon Park, in Mount Lebanon, New York, while the rest of the year, her address was 615 Fifth Avenue, in New York City. Her son Lindon Bates, Jr. also became an engineer; he later perished in the sinking of the RMS Lusitania.

Bates died in Yorktown, New York.

== Selected works ==
- A Blind Lead: The Story of a Mine (1888)
- A Nameless Wrestler (1889)
- Armaïs and others (1892)
- Bunch-grass Stories (1895)
