= Frank Amasa Bates =

American author, naturalist, and ornithologist (1858-1915)

Frank A. Bates
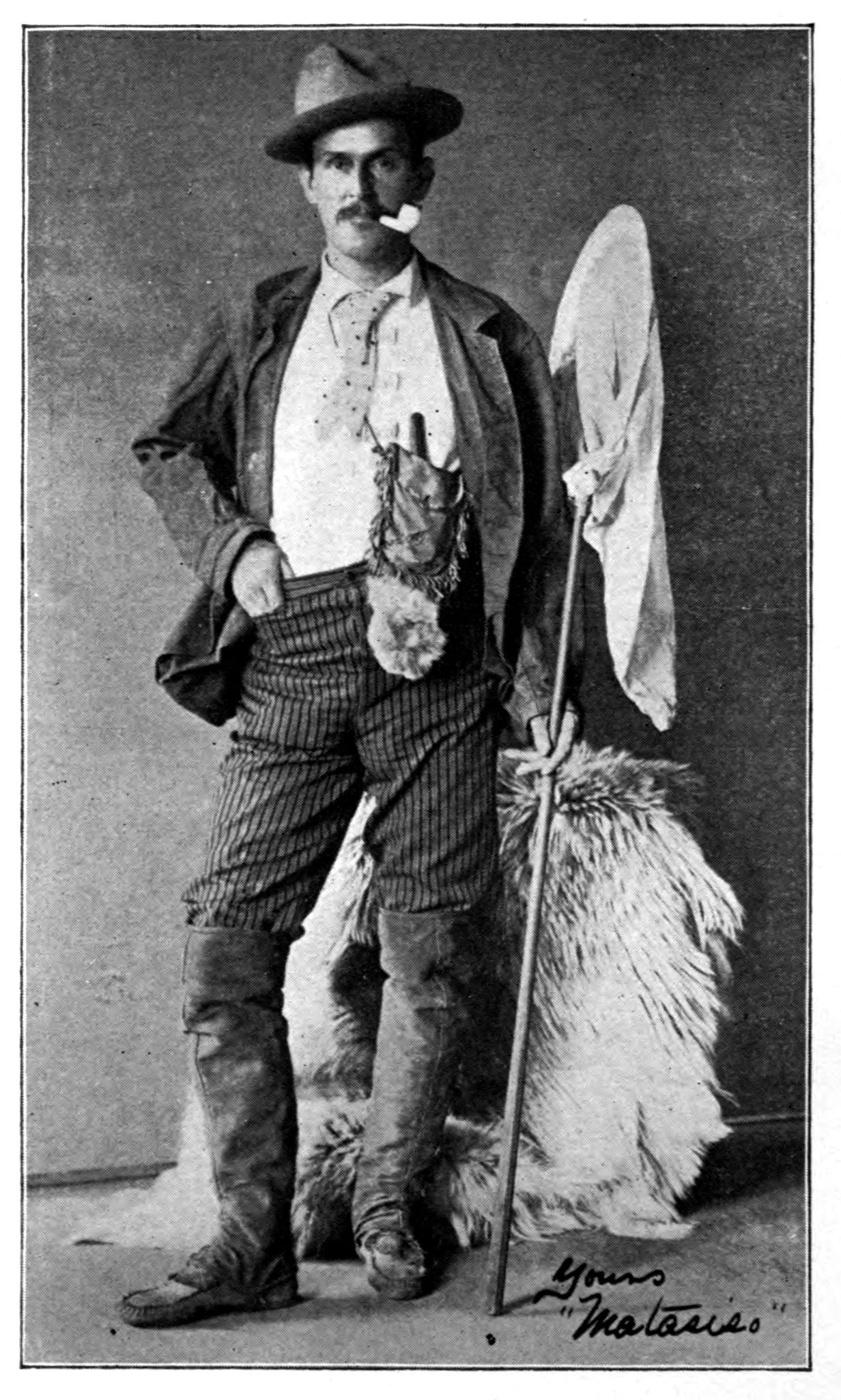
- Born: Frank Amasa Bates; March 5, 1858; Braintree, Massachusetts, United States
- Died: December 20, 1915 (aged 57); Braintree, Massachusetts, United States
- Resting place: Pond Street Cemetery
- Other name: Matasiso Bates
- Occupations: Author; Naturalist

Frank A. Bates (March 5, 1858 – December 20, 1915) was an American author, naturalist, ornithologist, and historian.

== Early life ==
Frank Amasa Bates was born on March 5, 1858, in Braintree, Massachusetts, United States. He was the son of Mary Harvey (née Kittrell) Bates and Samuel Austin Bates. His father held the position of town clerk in Braintree and was its historian for 25 years. Frank Bates was a 9th-generation descendant of Edward Bates of Weymouth.

Educated in Braintree's public schools, Bates completed high school in 1875.

== Career ==
After 1887, Frank Bates focused on his work as a naturalist. Specializing in natural history research work, he regularly wrote for magazines and gave lectures across the country. His natural history articles were seen as authoritative by government officials, and he provided frequent advice to United States officials. From 1888 to 1892, Bates was associate editor of the Ornithologist and Oölogist.

Bates was also appointed secretary of the League of Massachusetts Ornithologists, formed on June 25, 1889, and presided over by Frank Blake Webster. The association focused on the promotion of the science of ornithology. In September 1889, he visited Halifax, Nova Scotia as a guest of Andrew Downs.

He later served as field superintendent of the Massachusetts Board of Agriculture from 1892 to 1907. His career continued as a field agent for the Massachusetts Moth, Forestry, and Agricultural Departments from 1905 to 1909.

== Personal life ==
He became an active member of the Boston Scientific Society in 1888, becoming its president in 1894-95 and serving as secretary from 1896 to 1900.

Frank Bates was married twice, first to Cora A. Hibbard of Milton and then to Ruth Foss of Dover. He had a son named Harold Austin Bates by the late 1890s.

He served as president of the Orcutt Family Association in 1904 and later as its secretary. During the 1904 annual Orcutt reunion, he delivered an address titled "Some Orcutt Homesteads," revealing many previously unknown details about the historic properties connected to the family.

Frank Bates attended the Bates family reunion on July 30, 1907, held at the Brunswick Hotel in Boston. Known for his genealogical interests, Bates was elected vice president, representing the descendants of Edward of Weymouth. He delivered a keynote speech on "Edward of Weymouth," with approximately 100 family members in attendance. An executive committee was established to formalize the Bates Association's structure, with former Massachusetts Governor John L. Bates serving as president. The following year, he was elected president of the Bates Association on August 4, 1908.

Bates was admitted to the New England Historic Genealogical Society in October 1909.

== Death ==
Frank A. Bates died at age 57 on December 20, 1915, in Braintree, Massachusetts, United States. He left behind his widow, Ruth (née Foss) Bates, and two children. Bates was buried in the Pond Street Cemetery.

== Works ==
- Wanderings in New Hampshire (1891)
- The game birds of North America; a descriptive checklist (1896)
- The Ancient Iron Works at Braintree, Mass. (1898)
- Stories of Lake, Field and Forest: Rambles of a Sportsman-Naturalist (1899)
- Genealogy of the Descendants of Edward Bates of Weymouth, Mass (1900)
- Camping and Camp Cooking (1909)
- Bob and Grandpa: White Perch Fishing at Strait's Pond (1910)
- How to Make Old Orchards Profitable (1912)
