= Bates School (Bates, Arkansas) =

- U.S. National Register of Historic Places
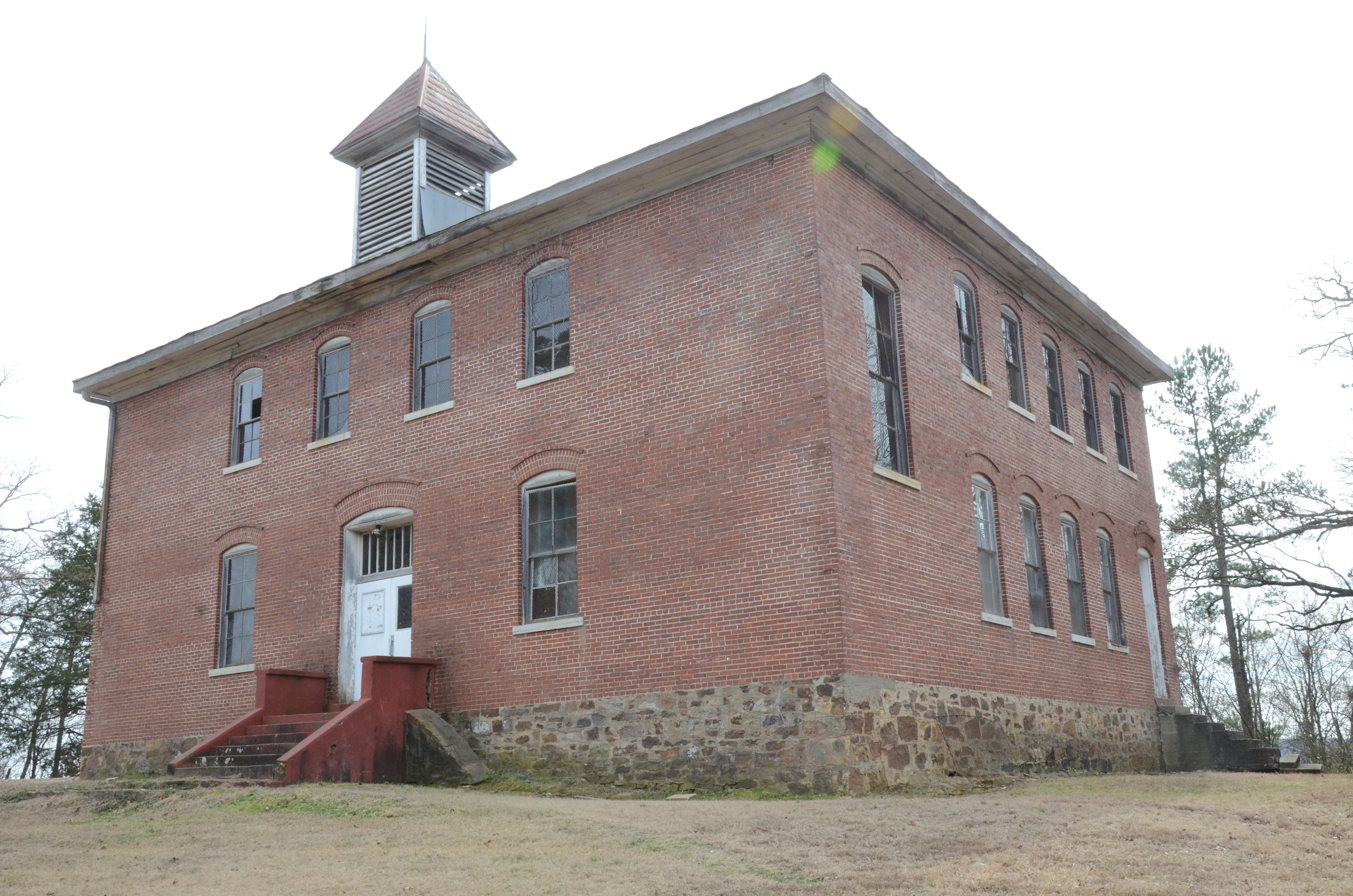

- Location within Arkansas Location within the United States
- Location: 1074 Bates School Rd., Bates, Arkansas
- Coordinates: 34°54′24″N 94°22′53″W
- Area: 5.3 acres (2.1 ha)
- Architectural style: Late 19th And Early 20th Century American Movements
- NRHP reference No.: 06000081
- Added to NRHP: February 21, 2006

The Bates School is a historic former school building at 1074 Bates School Road in Bates, Arkansas. It is a two-story brick building with a hip roof and Colonial Revival styling. Its main facade has a central entrance in a recessed segmented-arch opening, which is flanked on either side by windows set in similar openings. At the second level there are four windows two directly above the lower flanking windows, and two above the entrance. A cupola is set near the base of the roof above the entrance; it is square, louvered on all sides, and topped by a pyramidal roof. The school was built in about 1916, and was in use serving as a public school until 1964.

The building was listed on the National Register of Historic Places in 2006.

== See also ==
- National Register of Historic Places listings in Scott County, Arkansas
