= James Bates =

James or Jim Bates may refer to:

- James Bates (cricketer) (1856–1915), English cricketer
- James Bates (Maine politician) (1789–1882), American politician from Maine
- James K. Bates (1806–1872), New York physician and politician
- James L. Bates (1820–1875), brigadier general in the American Civil War
- James T. Bates (1844–1914), American businessman
- James M. Bates (1827–1911), American physician
- James Woodson Bates (1788–1846), American lawyer and politician from Arkansas
- Jim Bates (American football) (born 1946), former Miami Dolphins interim head coach
- Jim Bates (politician) (born 1941), former U.S. Representative
- Jimmy Bates (1910–2009), Australian rules footballer
- James Bates (conductor) (1952–2014), American conductor and organist
- The American comedian best known as The Real Spark

== See also ==
- Jamie Bates (footballer) (born 1968), English footballer
- Jamie Bates (born 1989), English welterweight kickboxer
- James Bate (disambiguation)
