= Benjamin Bates =

Benjamin Bates or Ben Bates may refer to:

- Several members of the American Bates family including:
  - Benjamin Bates II (1716–1790), British physician, art connoisseur, and socialite
  - Benjamin E. Bates (1808–1878), American rail industrialist, textile tycoon and philanthropist
- Ben Bates (born 1961), American professional golfer
- MV Ben Bates, coastal tanker built in 1956
