= James Archibald Hope =

Scottish army officer (1786–1871)

General Sir James Archibald Hope GCB
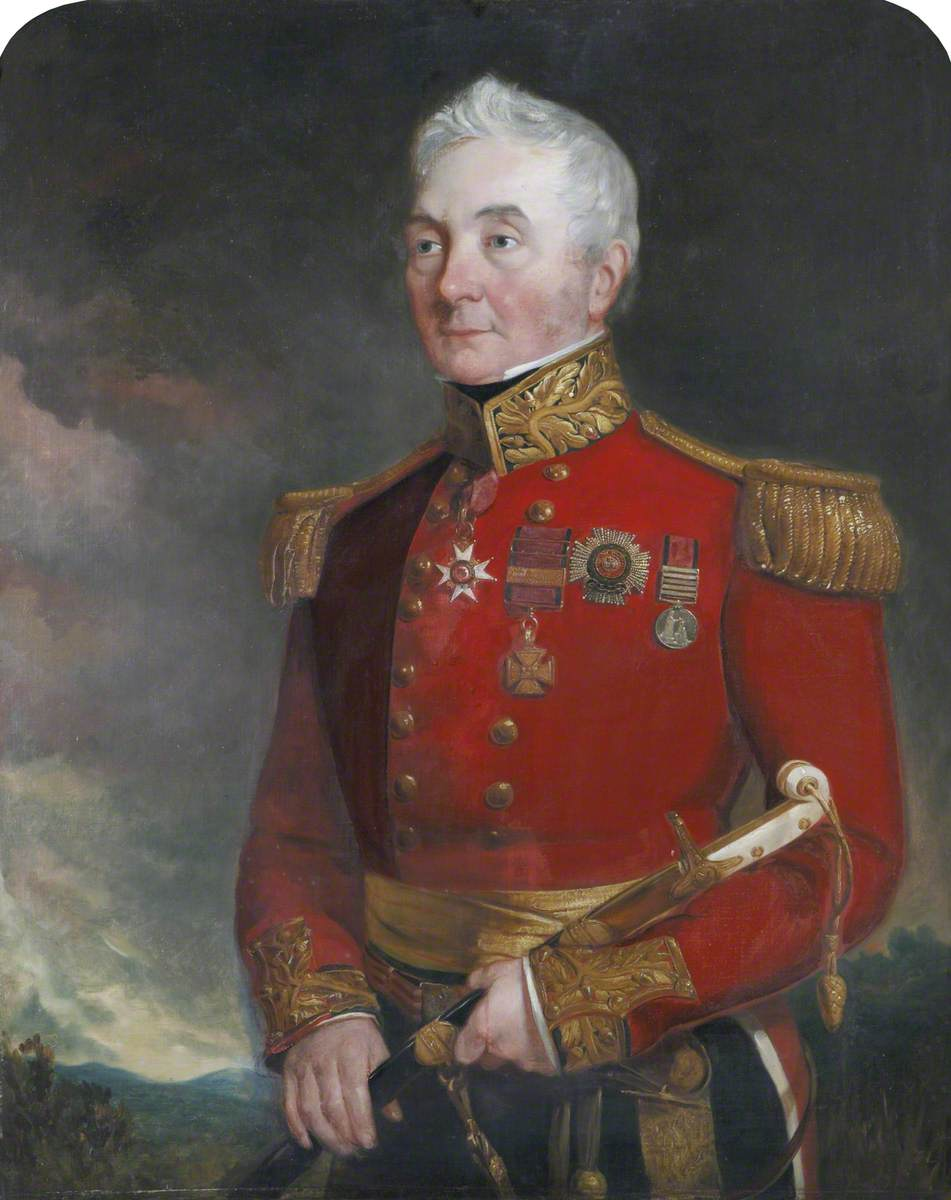
- Portrait by an unknown artist, c. 1835
- Born: 14 April 1786
- Died: 30 December 1871, aged 86; Cheltenham
- Military career
- Allegiance: United Kingdom
- Branch: British Army
- Service years: 1800–1871
- Rank: General
- Units: 26th Regiment of Foot; 3rd Foot Guards
- Conflicts: French Revolutionary Wars; Napoleonic Wars; Hanover Expedition; Battle of Copenhagen; Finnish War; Walcheren Campaign; Peninsular War; Battle of Corunna; Battle of Barrosa; Siege of Ciudad Rodrigo; Siege of Badajoz; Battle of Salamanca; Siege of Burgos; Battle of Vitoria; Siege of San Sebastián; Battle of the Bidassoa; Battle of Nivelle; Battle of the Nive; Battle of Orthez; Battle of Toulouse
- Awards: Army Gold Cross with five clasps

General Sir James Archibald Hope, GCB (14 April 1786 – 30 December 1871) was a senior officer in the British Army.

== Military service ==
Hope was born the son of Lieutenant-Colonel Erskine Hope of the 26th (Cameronian) Regiment of Foot. In January 1800 he joined the British Army as an ensign in the 26th, then stationed at Halifax, Nova Scotia.

Hope became a lieutenant in the regiment in 1801 and a captain in 1805. He served with the regiment in the Hanover Expedition in 1805–06 and was a deputy assistant adjutant-general under Lieutenant-General Lord Cathcart at the Battle of Copenhagen in 1807. He then served on the staff of Lieutenant-General Sir John Hope in Sweden during the Finnish War in 1808 and in the Peninsular War in 1808–09, including at the Battle of Corunna, and the Walcheren Campaign. He was aide-de-camp to Lieutenant-General Sir Thomas Graham at the Battle of Barossa, and brought home despatches and the French eagle captured by the 87th Regiment of Foot. He was afterwards with Graham at the sieges of Ciudad Rodrigo and Badajoz.

When Graham went home on sick leave during Lord Wellington's advance against the forts of Salamanca, Hope was appointed an assistant adjutant-general, in which capacity he was present at the Battle of Salamanca, Siege of Burgos, Battle of Vitoria, Siege of San Sebastián, and the Battle of the Bidassoa. He was afterwards selected, while attached to the 7th Division, to act as assistant adjutant-general and military secretary to Marshal William Beresford, who was in command of an army corps of three divisions. With this corps Hope was present at the concluding campaigns, including the Battle of Nivelle, Battle of the Nive, Battle of Orthez, and the Battle of Toulouse.

He was made a brevet-major in 1811 and lieutenant-colonel in 1813, and was promoted on 25 July 1814 to be captain and lieutenant-colonel of the 3rd Foot Guards. In that regiment he served twenty-five years, retiring on half-pay unattached in 1839. He became brevet-colonel in 1830, a major-general in 1841 and was employed on the staff in Lower Canada from 1841 to 1847. In 1833 he published his memoirs in The military memoirs of an infantry officer, 1809-1816. Hope was appointed colonel of the 9th Regiment of Foot in 1848, was made lieutenant-general in 1851, and promoted full general on 12 June 1859. He was created a Knight Grand Cross of the Order of the Bath in 1861.

Hope died at home in Balgowan House, Cheltenham on 30 December 1871, aged 86 and was buried in St Peters churchyard, Leckhampton. He was married to Christiana Elizabeth and had three children.

Military offices
Preceded by Sir Thomas Arbuthnot	Colonel of the 9th (East Norfolk) Regiment of Foot; 1848–1871	Succeeded by Sir Henry Bates
