= Joseph Bates =

Joseph Bates may refer to:

- Joseph Bates (Adventist) (1792–1872), American seaman and revivalist minister
- Joseph E. Bates (1837–1900), mayor of Denver
- Joe B. Bates (1893–1965), U.S. Representative from Kentucky
- Joseph L. Bates (1806/7–1886), American photographer in the second half of the 19th century
- Morris Bates (Joseph Morris Bates, 1864–1905), English footballer and founding member of Arsenal Football Club
