= David Bates (New Hampshire politician) =

American politician

Member of New Hampshire House of Representatives for Rockingham 7
- In office 2014–2018

Member of New Hampshire House of Representatives for Rockingham 4
- In office 2008–2012

Personal details
- Party: Republican

David Bates is an American politician. He was a member of the New Hampshire House of Representatives from 2008 to 2012, and 2014 to 2018.
