= Emma Bates (disambiguation) =

Emma Bates may refer to:

- Emma Bates (born 1992), American long distance runner
- Emma Bates (soccer) (born 2003), English-American soccer player
- Emma F. Bates (died 1921), American educator and politician
- Emma Bates (actress), actress in Much Ado About Nothing (2012 film)
- Emma Bates, backing vocals of When I Said I Wanted to Be Your Dog
- Emma Bates, character in So's Your Aunt Emma
- Emma Bates, candidate in 2017 Cambridgeshire County Council election
