= Daisy Bates =

Daisy Bates may refer to:

- Daisy Bates (author) (1859–1951), Australian journalist, author, anthropologist and lifelong student of Indigenous Australian culture and society
- Daisy Bates (activist) (1914–1999), American civil rights leader, journalist, publisher, and author
