= Sara Bates =

American mixed-media artist (born 1944)

- Born: 1944 (age 81–82); Muskogee, Oklahoma, United States
- Occupation: Mixed-media artist
- Known for: Mixed media

Sara Bates (born 1944) is an American mixed-media artist and member of the Cherokee Nation.

== Biography ==
Sara Bates was born in Muskogee, Oklahoma, in 1944. In 1987, she graduated from California State University, Bakersfield, with a Bachelor of Arts degree in Fine Art and Women's Studies. In 1989, she graduated from the University of California (Master of Fine Arts degree in Sculpture and Painting/Intermedia).

From 1990 to 1995, she served as the curator for American Indian Contemporary Arts (AICA) organization located in Piedmont, California. In 1997, Bates served as an instructor at San Francisco State University, and the following year, she taught at Florida State University as a visiting professor of art.

== Artistic style ==
Bates is known for her mixed-media mandala and medicine wheel designs. She makes these out of various plant products, like pine cones, seeds, leaves, and flowers. According to Phoebe Farris, these designs "are usually laid on the floor in an 8- to 12-foot circular designs, with the center in an equal-arm cross, the arms oriented toward the four cardinal directions."

Jehanne Teilhet-Fisk and Robin Franklin Nigh, in their book Dimensions of Native America (1998), wrote that Bates's work was "uniquely contemporary in form and very traditional in spirit". Similarly, Susan C. Power has noted that Bates's contemporary style is based on "poignant elements of rich historical precedents", and the San Francisco Arts Commission has also argued that the artist's work is notable for "envelop[ing] elements of their cultural background with European artistic traditions".

== Bibliography ==
- Farris, Phoebe, ed. (1999). Women Artists of Color: A Bio-Critical Sourcebook to 20th Century Artists in the Americas. Westport, CT: Greenwood Press. ISBN 0313303746.
- Power, Susan C. (2007). Art of the Cherokee: Prehistory to the Present. Athens, GA: University of Georgia Press. ISBN 9780820327662.
- Rushing, W. Jackson, ed. (2013). Native American Art in the Twentieth Century: Makers, Meanings, Histories. Abingdon-on-Thames, UK: Routledge. ISBN 978-1-136-18003-3.
- Teilhet-Fisk, Jehanne; Nigh, Robin Franklin, eds. (1998). Dimensions of Native America: The Contact Zone. Tallahassee, FL: Florida State University Museum of Fine Arts.
