= Mick Bates =

Mick Bates may refer to:

- Mick Bates (Australian footballer) (born 1949), Australian rules footballer
- Mick Bates (English footballer) (1947–2021), English footballer
- Mick Bates (Welsh politician) (1947–2022), Welsh politician
- Mick Bates (West Virginia politician) (born 1970), Australian-American politician

== See also ==
- Michael Bates (disambiguation)
