= Michael Bates =

Michael Bates may refer to:

- Michael Bates (actor) (1920–1978), British actor
- Michael Bates (American football) (born 1969), sprinter and American football kick returner
- Michael Bates, Baron Bates (born 1961), British Conservative Party politician
- Michael Bates (New Zealand cricketer) (born 1983), New Zealand cricketer
- Michael Bates (English cricketer) (born 1990), English cricketer
- Michael Bates (Sealand) (born 1952), businessman and self-declared Prince of the Principality of Sealand

== See also ==
- Mick Bates (disambiguation)
- Michael Bate (born c. 1947), Canadian media entrepreneur
- Mike Bate (born 1943), English biologist
