= Colin Milne =

Scottish priest and botanist (c. 1743–1815)

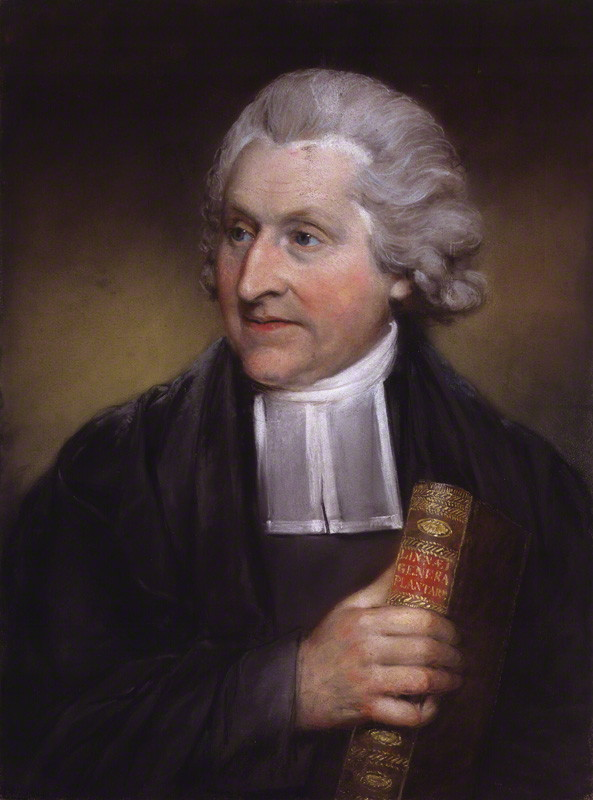
- Colin Milne, 1803 pastel
- Born: c. 1743; Aberdeen, Scotland
- Died: 2 October 1815; Deptford, England

Colin Milne (c.1743–1815) was a Scottish priest of the Church of England and botanist.

== Life ==
Born at Aberdeen about 1743, Milne was educated at Marischal College there under his uncle, Dr. Campbell, and later received the degree of LL.D. from the university. He moved to Edinburgh, and became tutor to Lord Algernon Percy. Taking Anglican orders, he made a reputation as a preacher.

Milne was appointed evening preacher to the City of London Lying-in Hospital, and lecturer to both the Old and the New Church at Deptford. Subsequently made rector of Northchapel, near Petworth in Sussex, he continued, however, to reside at Deptford where in 1783 he founded the Kent Dispensary, which became the Miller Hospital, Greenwich. He was a prominent promoter of the Royal Humane Society, and several times preached the anniversary sermon for the society.

Milne died at Deptford on 2 October 1815.

== Botanical Work ==
Milne published his Botanical Dictionary in 1770, dedicated to the Duke of Northumberland. The second edition of 1778 is a reissue of the first with black and white copper plates and a supplement. The third edition is a further expanded work with color plates.

== Works ==
Milne published:

- A Botanical Dictionary, or Elements of Systematic and Philosophical Botany, 1770, dedicated to the Duke of Northumberland, 2nd ed. 1778, 3rd ed. 1805.
- Institutes of Botany, a Translation of the Genera Plantarum of Linnæus, pt. i. 1771, pt. ii. 1772, not completed.
- Sermons, 1780. As a botanist Milne was chosen to preach the Fairchild sermon, and sermons which he delivered before the Grand Lodge of Freemasons and at the Maidstone assizes were also printed.
- Indigenous Botany … the result of several Botanical Excursions chiefly in Kent, Middlesex, and the adjacent Counties in 1790, 1791, and 1793, vol. i. only issued, 1793. Written with Alexander Gordon M.D. of Aberdeen, "reader in botany in London", and son of James Gordon, a nurseryman of Mile End who corresponded with Linnæus.
