= Orca Bates =

American model

Orca Bates (born 1976) was the favorite model for artist Jamie Wyeth. He was first painted in late 1989, and numerous times over the next five years. Orca was a "wild child", described by Jamie as "more of a seagull than a person". Orca's parents, Daniel and Amy Bates, had divorced by the time Orca was 12. Both remarried and continued to live on Manana Island (adjacent to Monhegan island, about 10 miles [16 km] off Pemaquid Point on the mainland), where they were neighbors of Jamie Wyeth. Orca and his younger sister, Kila, split their time between the two households.

Orca currently lives in Pine Island, New York. He married Colleen Dougherty in 2011. Orca's younger half-brother, Cat Bates (born 1986), also modeled for Jamie Wyeth in 1995.

Wyeth's paintings of Orca Bates include:

- "Portrait of Orca Bates," 1989, oil on panel, 50 x 40 in., William A Farnsworth Library & Art Museum, standing holding a large bird
- “Orca Bates,” 1990, oil on panel, 40 x 40 in., collection of Crystal Bridges Museum of American Art, Bentonville, Arkansas
- "Orca" 1990, Standing in blue uniform, 50 x 44 in.
- Screen Door to the Sea, 1994, oil on panel, 36 x 30 in.

== Additional reading ==
Anderson, Cindy, "A Portrait of Orca Bates", Yankee, Vol. 60, No. 9, Sept. 1996, pp. 54–127
