= Henry Bates Joel =

British landscape painter

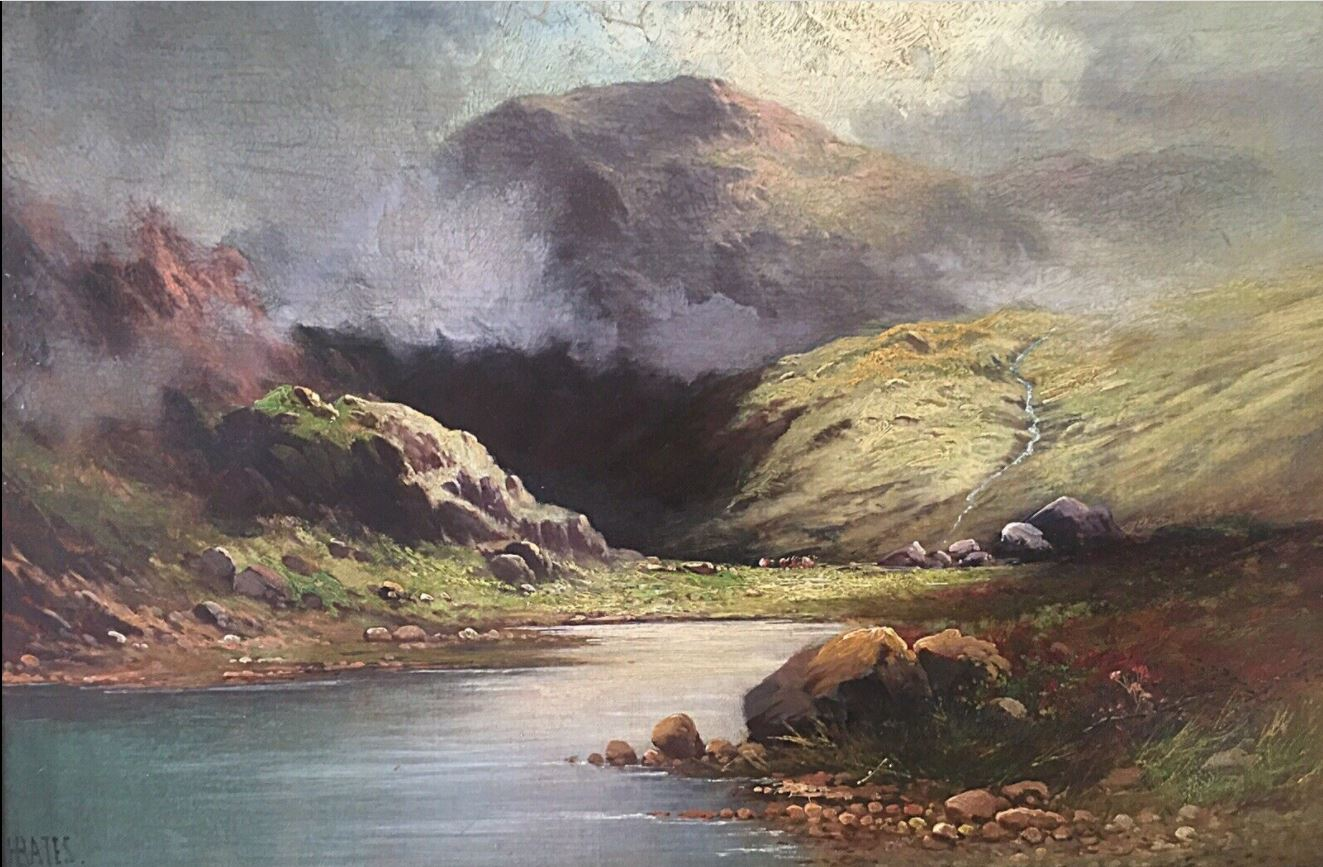
A 1890s Joel painting depicting the Scottish highlands is signed H Bates.

Henry Bates Joel (1875–1922) was a British landscape painter of the late Victorian era. Joel exhibited from 1880 to 1905 and primarily painted coastal scenes and landscapes.

== Works and legacy ==
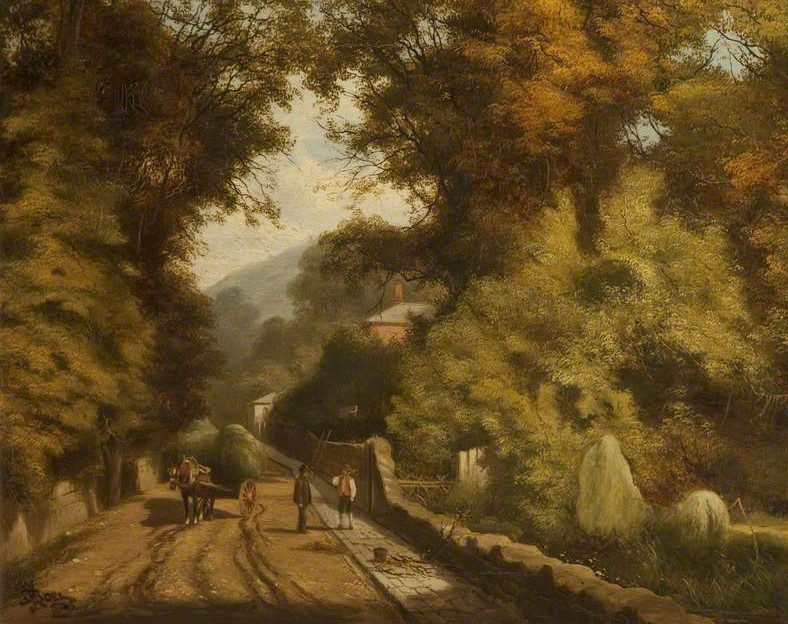
Bates' 1895 artwork 'Bonchurch, near Ventnor, Isle of Wight'

Bates Joel concentrated on romanticised landscapes, figures and coastal scenes. The artist's most popular motive was the Scottish Highlands. Joel was a much respected artist during the Victorian and Edwardian era, valued especially for the vibrancy of his palette and 'flowing', 'sophisticated' brush strokes, yet was largely forgotten (and underestimated) in the late 20th and early 21st century. A prolific artist, his work is often seen on the market today. He has been sold at Bonhams, Sotheby's and Christies and has seen increasing popularity by collectors.

Bates Joel exhibited from 1884 to 1922 and is catalogued as H B Joel, J H Boel and H Bates as his signatures are "monogrammed with initials and difficult to read." This has led to Henry Bates Joel sometimes being referred to as John Henry Boel in auctions and on some portals; there is limited evidence that Boel was his actual name, but this is subject to speculation. Early examples of his paintings (during the 1890s) are usually dated, which is not the case for his later works.

Joel is part of the 'late romantic movement', aimed at supporting the emphasis of aesthetic values. Bates will have been inspired by the likes of Turner and Constable, adding a 'contemporary, Victorian, perspective' to traditional imagery. Paintings such as 'Loch Lomod' are typical for Bates Joel's style; "refined and vibrant yet with strongly romanticised aura." Henry Bates Joel's primary medium of painting was oil but many watercolours exist as well.

Joel also painted the Isle of Wight, some of his paintings (such as 'Bonchurch, near Ventnor, Isle of Wight', which shows an impressionist influence) are exhibited in Milntown Estate. Clifton park and museum displays some of his paintings as well.

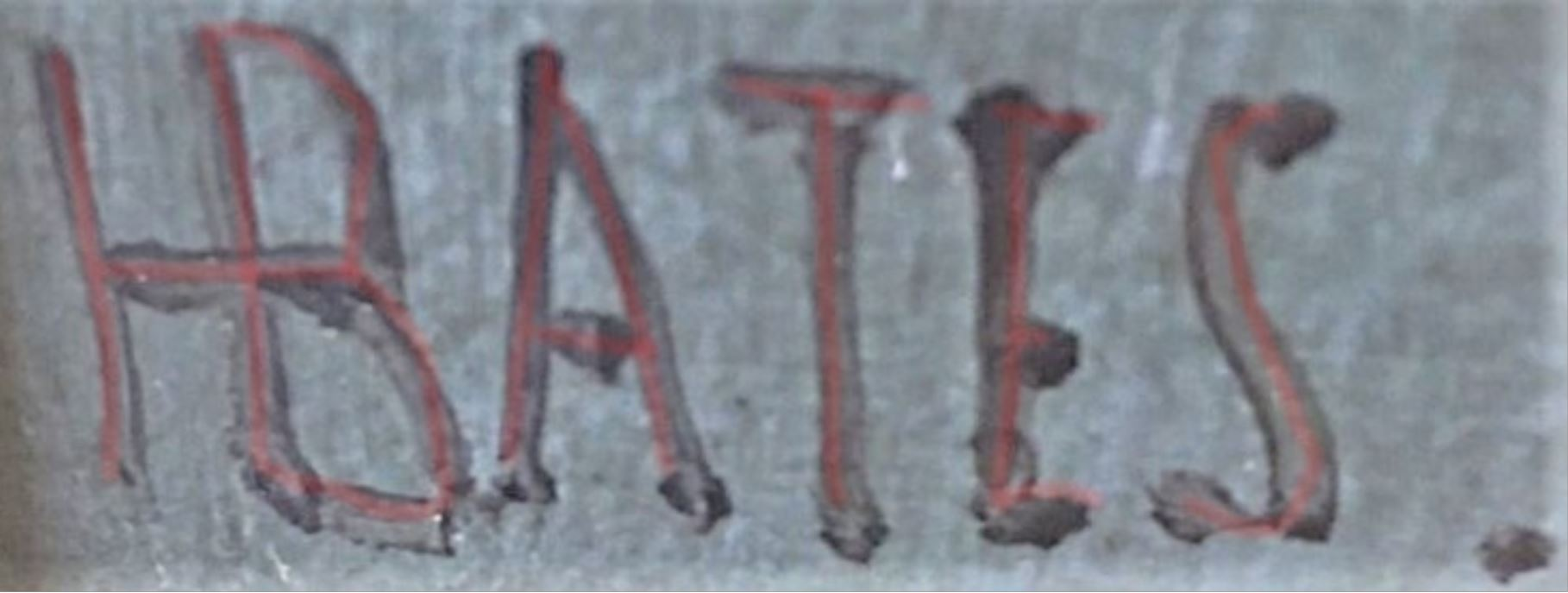
Signature: HBates.

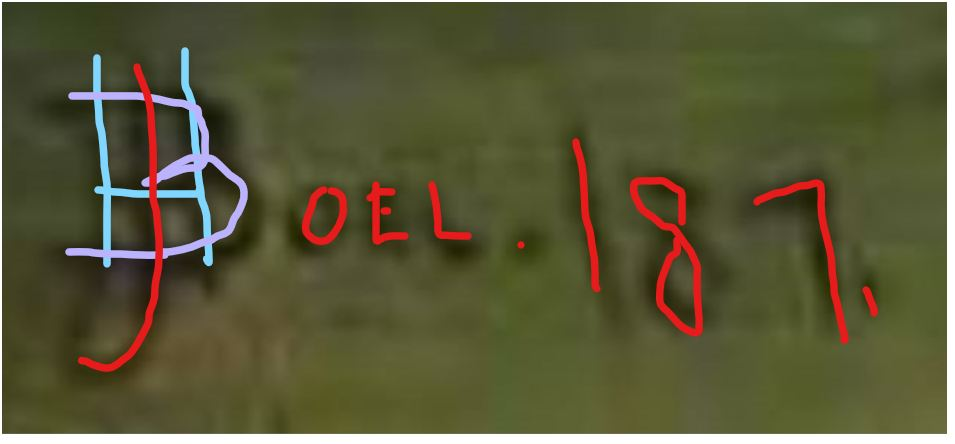
This signature by Joel could also be read as Boel, jet, when distinguishing between its compartments, it becomes clear that it reads H. B. Joel.
