= Madeleine Bates =

Researcher in natural language processing

Madeleine Ashcraft Bates (born c. 1948) is a researcher in natural language processing who worked at BBN Technologies in Cambridge, Massachusetts from the early 1970s to the late 1990s. She was president of the Association for Computational Linguistics in 1985, and co-editor of the book Challenges in Natural Language Processing (1993).

== Education and career ==
Bates was a student at Allegheny College before transferring to Carnegie Mellon University, where she majored in mathematics, graduating in 1968. She completed her Ph.D. in applied mathematics at Harvard University in 1975, working there with Bill Woods on augmented transition networks.

While a student at Harvard, she began working part-time at BBN in 1971. After completing her Ph.D., she was an assistant professor at Boston University for three years before becoming a full-time researcher at BBN.

== Personal life ==
Bates married chemist Alan Hunt Bates in summer 1968; he later became a professor at the University of Massachusetts Dartmouth. Her mother, Madeleine DeMuth Ashcraft (died 1990), was a long-term sufferer of Huntington's disease, and Bates has been an activist for the treatment of Huntington's disease, serving as president of the Massachusetts Chapter of the committee to Combat Huntington's Disease.

== Selected publications ==
- Bates, M. (February 1975), "The use of syntax in a speech understanding system", IEEE Transactions on Acoustics, Speech, and Signal Processing, 23 (1): 112–117, Bibcode:1975ITASS..23..112B, doi:10.1109/tassp.1975.1162640
- Bates, Madeleine (1978), "The theory and practice of augmented transition network grammars", in Bolc, Leonard (ed.), Natural Language Communication with Computers, Lecture Notes in Computer Science, vol. 63, Springer-Verlag, pp. 191–254, doi:10.1007/bfb0031372, ISBN 3-540-08911-X
- Bates, Madeleine (1982), "AI Research at Bolt, Beranek & Newman, Inc", AI Magazine, 3 (2): 44–46, archived from the original on 2020-10-30
- Bates, Madeleine; Weischedel, Ralph M., eds. (1993), Challenges in Natural Language Processing, Studies in Natural Language Processing, Cambridge University Press
- Hirschman, L.; Tzoukermann, E.; Bates, M.; Dahl, D.; Fisher, W.; Garofolo, J.; Pallett, D.; Hunicke-Smith, K.; Price, P.; Rudnicky, A. (1993), "Multi-site data collection and evaluation in spoken language understanding", Proceedings of the Workshop on Human Language Technology - HLT '93 (PDF), Association for Computational Linguistics, p. 19, doi:10.3115/1075671.1075676, ISBN 1-55860-324-7
- Dahl, Deborah A.; Bates, Madeleine; Brown, Michael; Fisher, William; Hunicke-Smith, Kate; Pallett, David; Pao, Christine; Rudnicky, Alexander; Shriberg, Elizabeth (1994), "Expanding the scope of the ATIS task", Proceedings of the workshop on Human Language Technology - HLT '94 (PDF), Association for Computational Linguistics, p. 43, doi:10.3115/1075812.1075823, ISBN 1-55860-357-3
- Bates, M. (October 1995), "Models of natural language understanding", Proceedings of the National Academy of Sciences, 92 (22): 9977–9982, Bibcode:1995PNAS...92.9977B, doi:10.1073/pnas.92.22.9977, PMC 40721, PMID 7479812
- Bates, Madeleine; Bobrow, Robert J. (1997), "Using BBN VALAD: Speech at the Logistics Anchor Desk", 5th Applied Natural Language Processing Conference, ANLP 1997, Marriott Hotel, Washington, USA, March 31 - April 3, 1997, Association for Computational Linguistics, p. 35, doi:10.3115/974281.974303
