= Charlotte Fiske Bates =

American writer

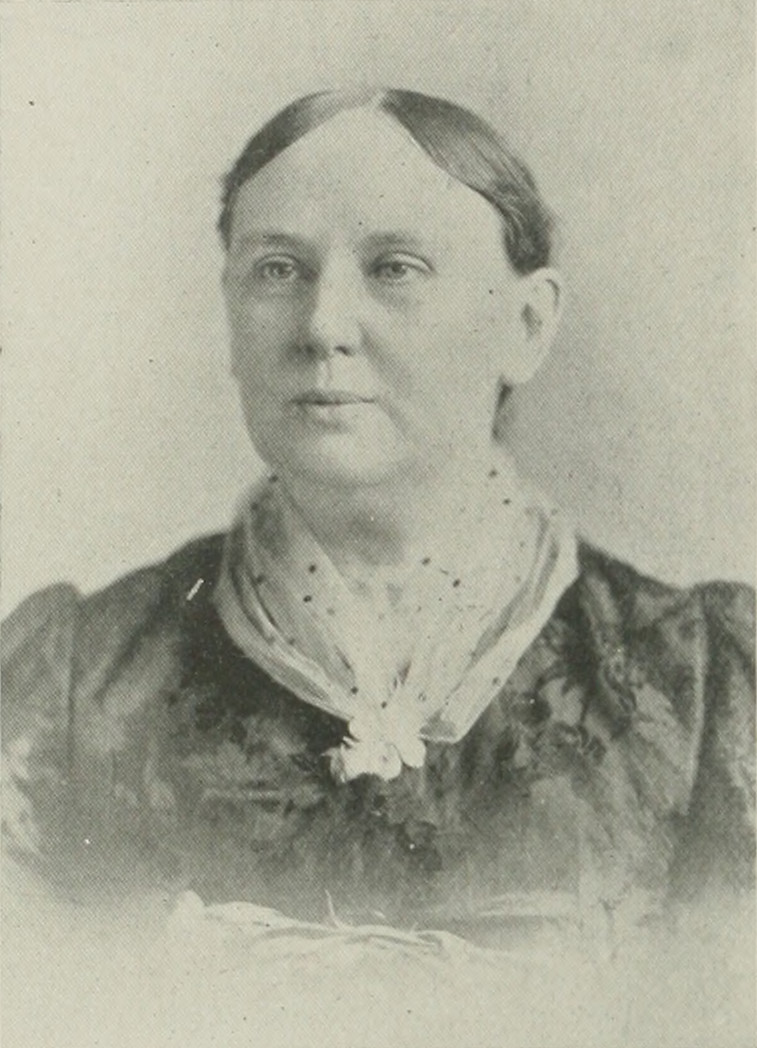
"A Woman of the Century"

Charlotte Fiske Bates Rogé (pen name, Mme. Rogé; November 30, 1838 – September 1, 1916) was an American writer, critic, and educator.

== Biography ==
Charlotte Fiske Bates was born in New York City as the youngest of six children. Her father, Hervey Bates, died when she was an infant, causing her mother, Eliza Endicott Bates, to relocate the family to Cambridge, Massachusetts. After public education and private tutoring, Bates accepted a position at the Salisbury School for Young Ladies as an instructor of English in September 1888.

In 1879, she published Risks and Other Poems, which contained about 120 poems, including ten sonnets, ten French translations (originally done for Henry Wadsworth Longfellow's anthology Poems of Places) and five epithalamia. She also contributed many articles to magazines, and edited the Longfellow Birthday Book (1881), Seven Voices of Sympathy (1881), and the Cambridge Book of Poetry and Song (1882). In editing the first-named works she cooperated with Longfellow, whom she also assisted in compiling his Poems of Places. She was mentioned by Dr. Franklin Johnson in his eulogy of Longfellow in 1882.

In 1891, she married M. Adolphe Rogé, who died in 1896 of malaria, three months before their five-year anniversary.

== Published works ==
=== Author ===
- Risks and Other Poems (1879)
- "The Heart's Easter" (1902)
- "Solace" (1894)

=== Editor ===
- Longfellow Birthday Book (1881)
- Seven Voices of Sympathy (1881)
- Cambridge Book of Poetry and Song (1882)
- Poems of Places (1879)

== Sources ==
- Cary, Richard (1964), "Charlotte Fiske Bates: Cupbearer to Demigods", Colby Quarterly, 6 (9): 385–398
