= Martin Bate =

British DJ

Martin Bate has been a DJ on UK radio station Xfm since January 2008.

== Dj career ==
He has his own show called "The XFM Rock Show". He also worked on another show called "Music: Response" on Xfm Scotland until the station became Galaxy Scotland in November 2008.

=== The split ===
On 22 June 2008 The XFM Rock Show split in half down the UK, with Martin Bate continuing to host the show in Scotland and "Katie P", or Katie Parsons, previously of Kerrang!, hosting the London and Manchester show.

It is now no longer clear whether Martin is still working at Xfm as Xfm Scotland became Galaxy Scotland on 7 November 2008 and only the London version (Xfm London) can be heard in Scotland through a DAB Digital Radio or Digital TV. However some of his web pages are still on the Xfm website.
