= Henry Walter Bates =

English naturalist and explorer

Henry Walter Bates FRS FLS FGS
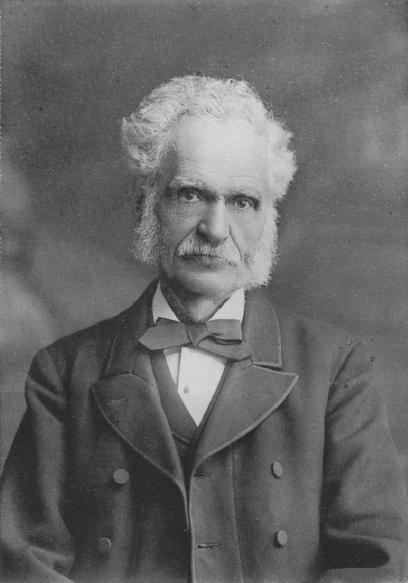
- Born: 8 February 1825; Leicester, England
- Died: 16 February 1892 (aged 67); London, England
- Resting place: East Finchley Cemetery, London
- Known for: Amazon voyage Batesian mimicry
- Spouse: Sarah Ann Mason
- Scientific career
- Fields: Mimicry, natural history, geography
- Workplaces: Royal Geographical Society, London

Henry Walter Bates (8 February 1825 – 16 February 1892) was an English naturalist and explorer who gave the first scientific account of mimicry in animals. He was most famous for his expedition to the rainforests of the Amazon with Alfred Russel Wallace, starting in 1848. Wallace returned in 1852, but lost his collection on the return voyage when his ship caught fire. When Bates arrived home in 1859 after a full eleven years, he had sent back over 14,712 species (mostly of insects) of which 8,000 were (according to Bates, but see Van Wyhe) new to science. Bates wrote up his findings in his best-known work, The Naturalist on the River Amazons (1863). Batesian mimicry is named in his honor.

== Life ==
Henry Walter Bates was born in Leicester on 8 February 1825 as the eldest son of a literate middle-class family. He was a son of Henry Bates (d. 1870), a small hosiery manufacturer, and a grandson of Robert Bates, a dyer of hosiery. Henry had a younger brother, Frederick Bates, who was also a naturalist and entomologist, as well as a brewer. Bates was initially educated at Creaton's boarding school in Billesden, about 9 miles (14 km) away. In 1838, at the typical age of 13, he became apprenticed to work at the warehouse of Alderman Gregory, a hosier. He joined and spent his spare time at the local mechanics' institute, where he studied languages, and met multiple naturalists who he learned from. With his brothers, he collected insect specimens in Charnwood Forest. In 1843, at age 18 and still at the warehouse, he had a short paper on beetles published in The Zoologist, which was his first contribution to entomology literature. He would later write many more articles in that journal. He was initially primarily interested in butterflies, and then in beetles, but he also learned some botany.

Bates became friends with Alfred Russel Wallace when Wallace (age 21) took a teaching post in the Leicester Collegiate School. Wallace was previously interested in plants, but Bates's insect collection inspired him to switch to entomology. They read works about uniformitarianism and the geological history of Earth by Charles Lyell and travel narratives by Charles Darwin and Alexander von Humboldt, as well as Vestiges of the Natural History of Creation, a popular pseudo-scientific book written anonymously by Robert Chambers, sparking their interest in the theory of evolution. They also read William H. Edwards's Voyage Up the River Amazons on his Amazon expedition, and this started them thinking that a visit to the region would be exciting, and might launch their careers.

=== The great adventure ===
In 1847 Wallace and Bates discussed the idea of an expedition to the Amazon rainforest, the plan being to cover expenses by sending specimens back to London. There an agent would sell them for a commission. (The often repeated statement that the main purpose was for the travellers to "gather facts towards solving the problem of the origin of species", and that Wallace put this in a letter to Bates, is almost certainly a myth, originating in a convenient adjustment of history by Bates in The Naturalist on the River Amazons of 1863.) The two friends, who were both by now experienced amateur entomologists, met in London to prepare themselves. They did this by viewing South American plants and animals in the main collections. Also they collected "wants lists" of the desires of museums and collectors. All known letters exchanged between Wallace and Bates are available in Wallace Letters Online.

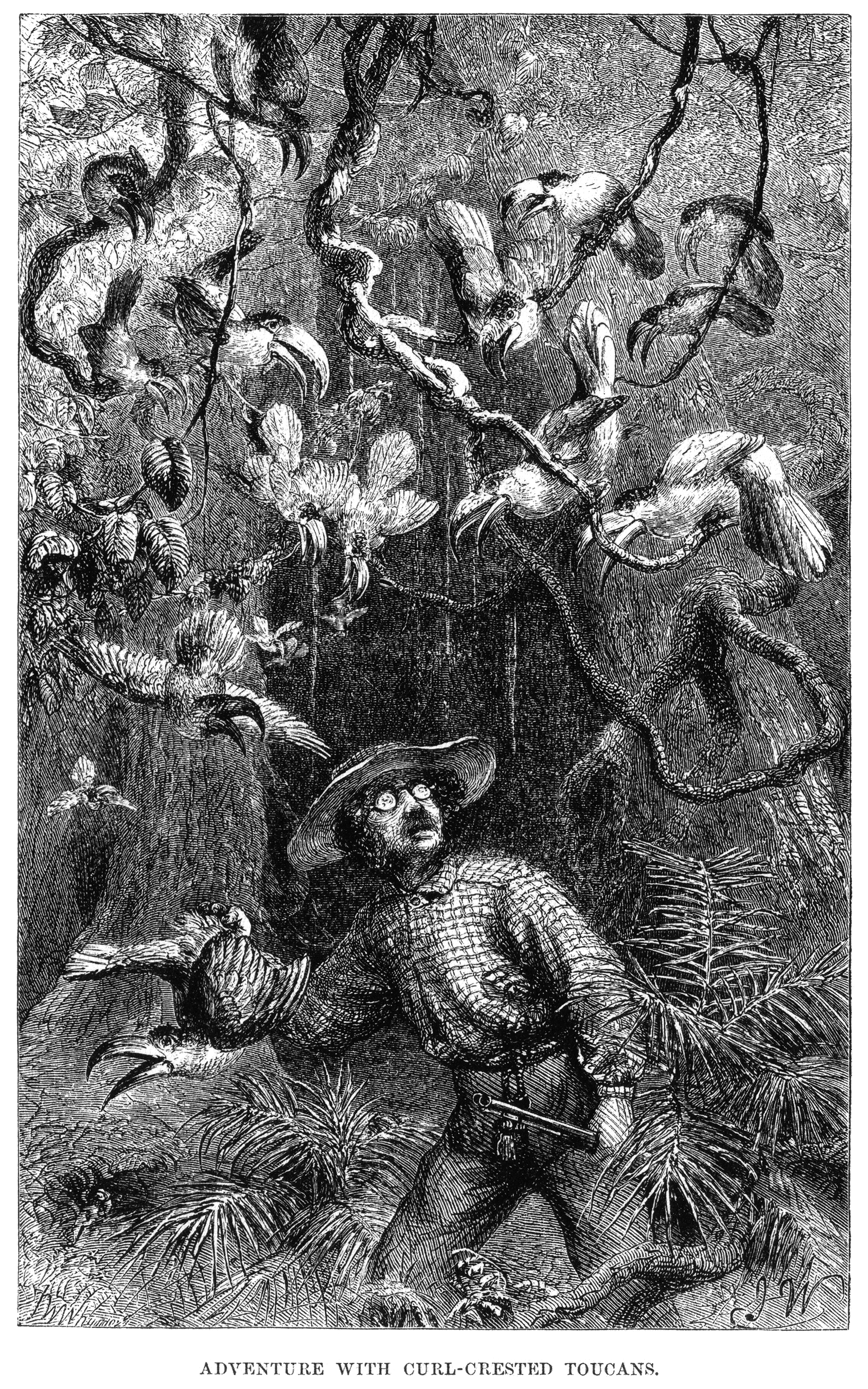
Bates in Amazonia: "Adventure with curl-crested toucans"

Bates and Wallace sailed from Liverpool in April 1848, arriving in Pará (now Belém) at the end of May. For the first year they settled in a villa near the city, collecting birds and insects. After that they agreed to collect independently, Bates travelling to Cametá on the Tocantins River. He then moved up the Amazon, to Óbidos, Manaus and finally to the Upper Amazon (Solimões). Tefé was his base camp for four and a half years. His health eventually deteriorated and he returned to Britain in 1859, after having spent nearly eleven years on the Amazon. He sent his collection on three different ships to avoid the fate of his colleague Wallace, who had lost his entire collection in 1852 when his ship sank. Bates spent the next three years writing his account of the trip, The Naturalist on the River Amazons, widely regarded as one of the finest reports of natural history travels.

== Home at last ==
In 1863 he married Sarah Ann Mason. From 1864 onwards, he worked as assistant secretary of the Royal Geographical Society (effectively, he was the secretary, since the senior post was occupied by a noble figurehead). He sold his personal Lepidoptera collection to Frederick DuCane Godman and Osbert Salvin and began to work mostly on beetles (cerambycids, carabids, and cicindelids). From 1868 to 1869 and in 1878 he was president of the Entomological Society of London. In 1871 he was elected a fellow of the Linnaean Society, and in 1881 he was elected a fellow of the Royal Society.

He died of bronchitis in 1892 (in modern terms, that may mean emphysema). A large part of his collections are in the Natural History Museum (see The Field, London, 20 February 1892). Specimens he collected went to the Natural History Museum, at that time called the British Museum (Natural History), and to private collectors; yet Bates still retained a huge reference collection and was often consulted on difficult identifications. This, and the disposal of the collection after his death, are mentioned in Edward Clodd's Memories.

Wallace wrote an obituary of Bates in Nature. He describes Bates's 1861 paper on mimicry in Heliconiidae butterflies as "remarkable and epoch-making", with "a clear and intelligible explanation", briefly addressing its attackers as "persons who are more or less ignorant of the facts". He then praises Bates's contributions to entomology, before regretting, in remarkably bitter words for an official obituary, that the "confinement and constant strain" of "mere drudgery of office work" for the Royal Geographical Society had with "little doubt ... weakened his constitution and shortened a valuable life".

== His work ==
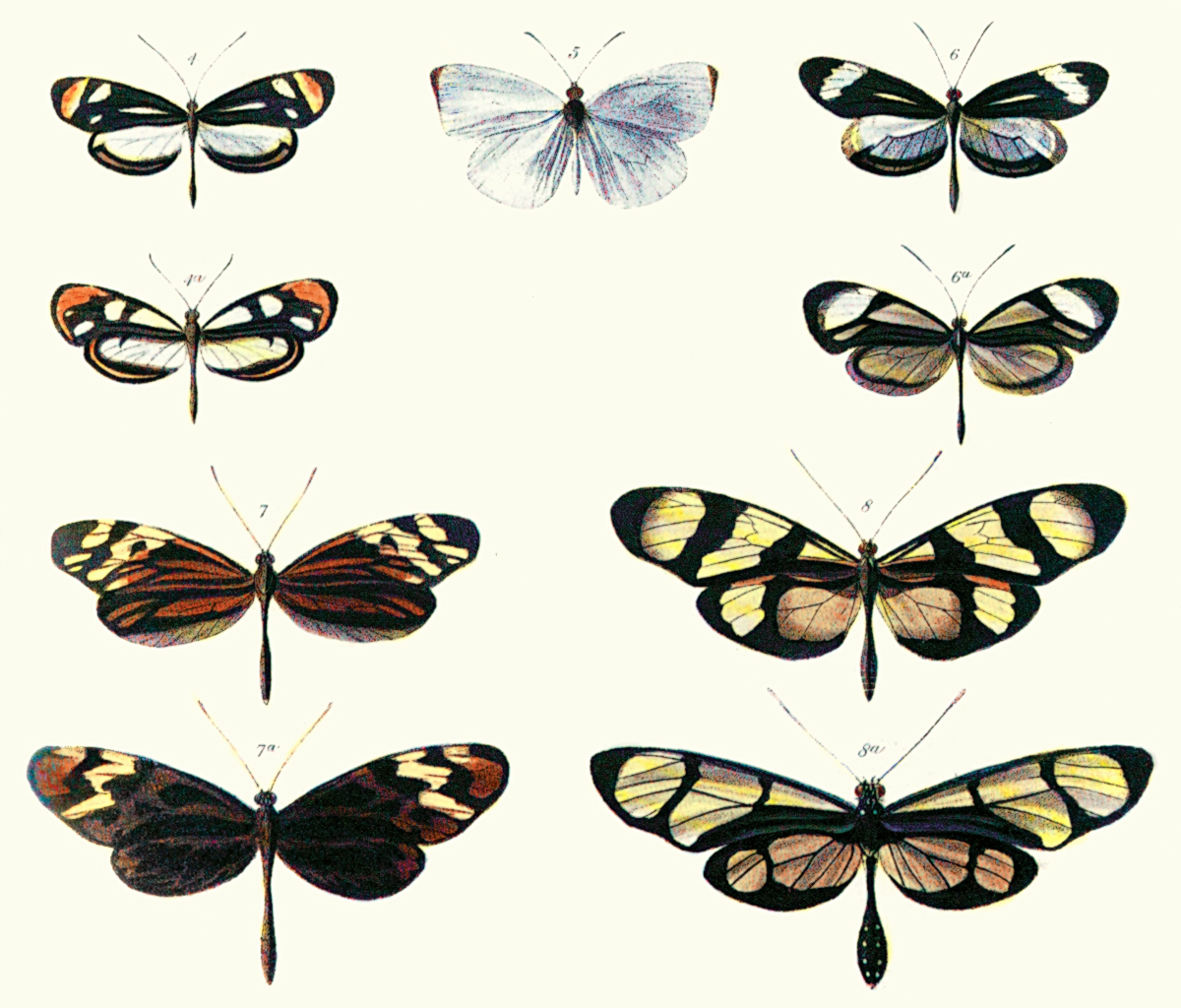
Plate from Bates's 1862 paper "Contributions to an insect fauna of the Amazon Valley: Heliconiidae"

Henry Bates was one of a group of outstanding naturalist-explorers who were supporters of the theory of evolution by natural selection (Charles Darwin and Alfred Russel Wallace 1858). Other members of this group included Joseph Dalton Hooker, Fritz Müller, Richard Spruce and Thomas Henry Huxley.

Bates's work on Amazonian butterflies led him to develop the first scientific account of mimicry, especially the kind of mimicry which bears his name: Batesian mimicry. This is the mimicry by a palatable species of an unpalatable or noxious species. A common example seen in temperate gardens is the hover-fly, many of which – though bearing no sting – mimic the warning colouration of hymenoptera (wasps and bees). Such mimicry does not need to be perfect to improve the survival of the palatable species.

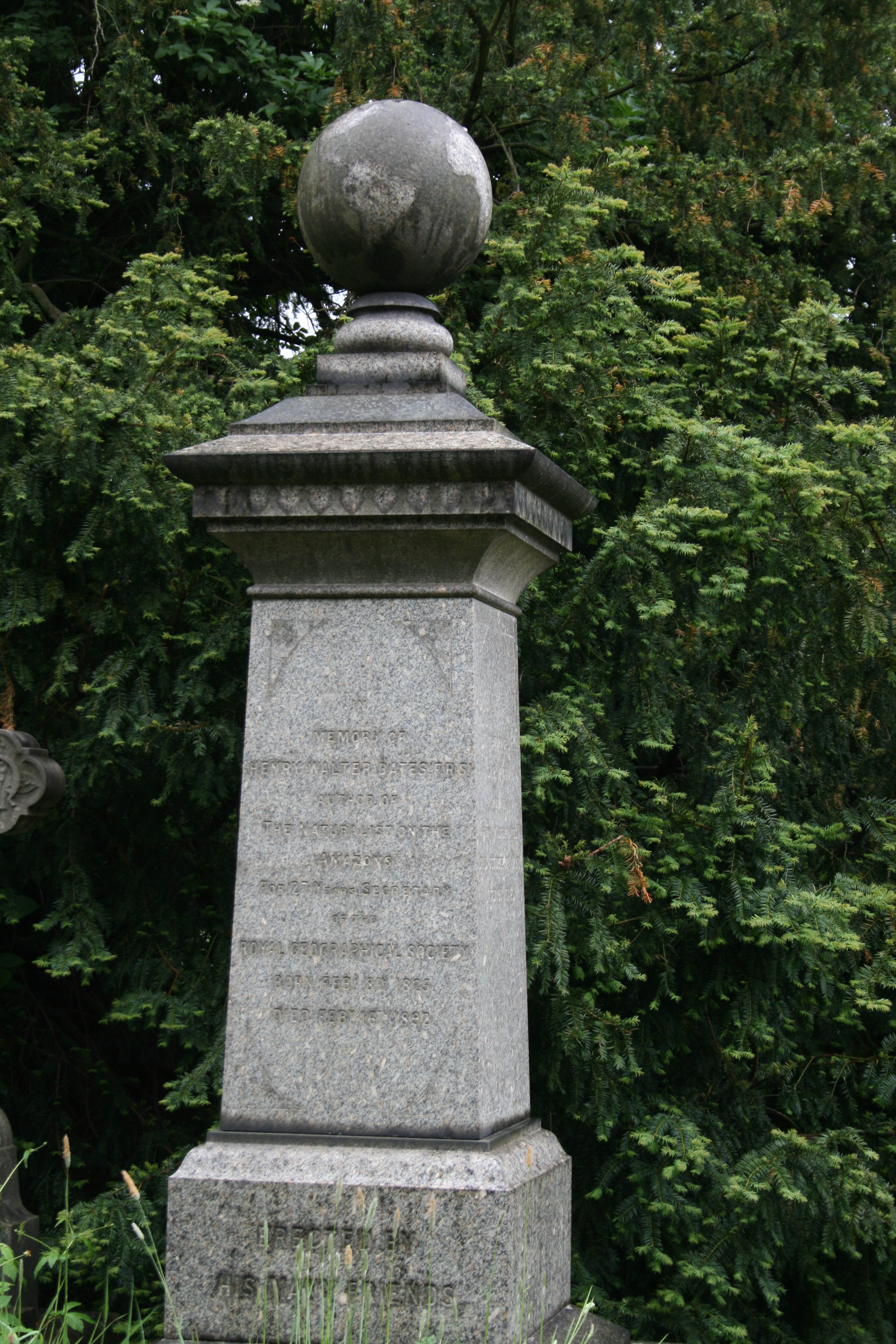
Bates's grave in East Finchley Cemetery

Bates noted of the Heliconids (long-wings) that they were forest dwellers which were:

1. abundant 2. conspicuous and slow-flying. 3. gregarious; and also 4. the adults frequented flowers. 5. the larvae fed together.

And yet, said Bates "I never saw the flocks of slow-flying Heliconidae in the woods persecuted by birds or dragonflies ... nor when at rest did they appear to be molested by lizards, or predacious flies of the family Asilidae [robber-flies] which were very often seen pouncing on butterflies of other families. ... In contrast, the Pieridae (sulfur butterflies), to which Leptalis belongs [now called Dismorphia] are much persecuted."

Bates observed that many Heliconid species are accompanied by other species (Pierids), which mimic them, and often cannot be distinguished from them in flight. They fly in the same parts of the forest as the model (Heliconid) and often in company with them. Local races of the model are accompanied by corresponding races or species of the mimic. So a scarce, edible species takes on the appearance of an abundant, noxious species. Predators, Bates supposed, learn to avoid the noxious species, and a degree of protection covers the edible species, no doubt proportional to its degree of likeness to the model. These testable hypotheses about warning signals and mimicry helped to create the field of evolutionary ecology.

Bates, Wallace and Müller believed that Batesian and Müllerian mimicry provided evidence for the action of natural selection, a view which is now standard amongst biologists. Field and experimental work on these ideas continues to this day; the topic connects strongly to speciation, genetics and development.

=== Ega ===
Bates spent the best part of a year at Ega (now Tefé) in the Upper Amazon (Solimões), where he reported that turtle was eaten regularly, and insect catches were especially abundant. He found upwards of 7,000 species of insects in the area, including 550 distinct species of butterfly. Bates nursed a sick toucan back to health. Tocáno (the Indian name, after its cries) proved to be an intelligent and amusing companion, with a voracious appetite. Mainly a fruit eater, he learnt the meal times "to a nicety", and would eat flesh and fish as well as fruit.

==== Taxonomy ====
Bates's original work was done on a group of conspicuous butterflies always spelled by Bates as Heliconidae. He divided this assemblage into two groups, the Danaoid Heliconids, having affinities with the tribe Danaini (see also Danainae); and the Acraeoid Heliconids related to the Acraeini. The former are now known as Ithomiini, closely related to the milkweed butterflies, and were named after the genus Danaus in the Danainae. The latter are now known as the tribe Heliconiini, or longwings, named after the genus Heliconius. Both group within the family Nymphalidae, and both groups tend to feed on poisonous plants. The milkweed plant supplies poisonous glycosides which render both caterpillar and adult danaines noxious. Ithomiines, in contrast gain their toxicity from their adult nectar sources. Heliconiine caterpillars feed on poisonous Passiflora vines. However, ithomiines gain their toxicity from their adult food plants.

== Legacy ==
Henry Walter Bates is commemorated in the scientific name of a species of South American boa, Corallus batesii and in the name of his theory of mimicry, Batesian mimicry.
