= David Bates (poet) =

American poet

- Born: March 6, 1809; Indian Hill, Ohio
- Died: January 25, 1870 (aged 60)
- Occupation: Poet

David Bates (March 6, 1809 – January 25, 1870) was an American poet.

== Life and Career ==
He was born in Indian Hill, Ohio, and educated in Buffalo, New York, before working in first Indianapolis then Philadelphia. In 1849, he published a volume of poetry, Eolian.

Among his best-known works are Speak Gently, which was parodied by Lewis Carroll in Alice's Adventures in Wonderland, as well as "Chiding", and "Childhood".

In adulthood, he began his career as a clerk and later became a full member and chief buyer for an Indianapolis mercantile house. Bates also wrote poetry and, at the age of 40, published a collection titled Eolian. One of the poems in the collection, Speak Gently, has been described as a “universal hymn” for readers around the world.
