= Joshua Bates School =

- U.S. National Register of Historic Places
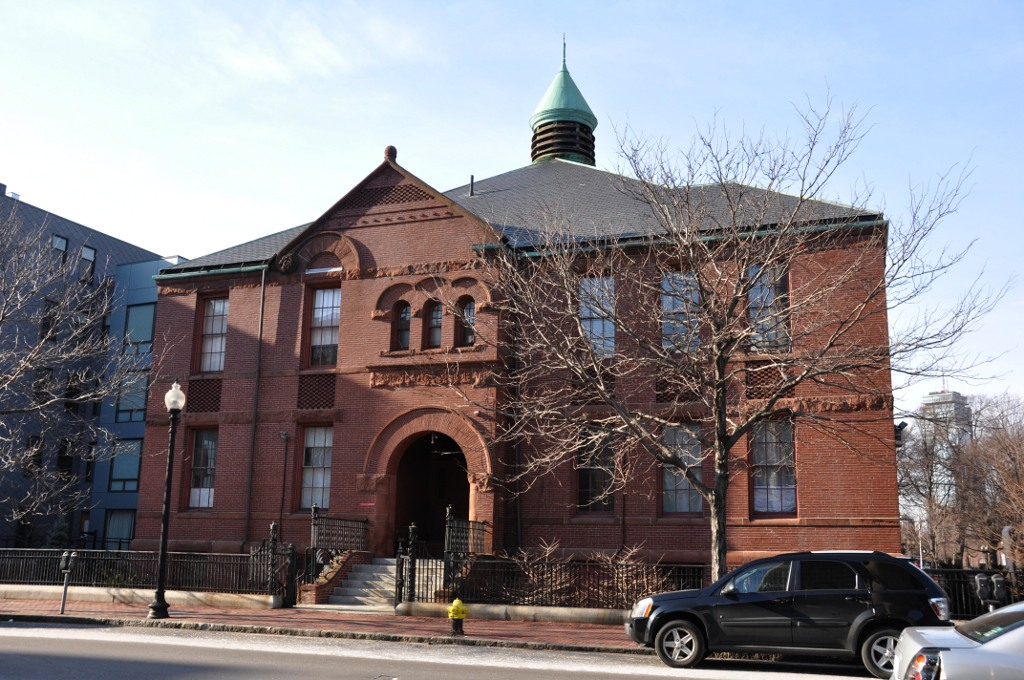

- Location within Massachusetts Location within the United States
- Location: 731 Harrison Ave., Boston, Massachusetts
- Coordinates: 42.33804°N 71.07171°W
- Area: less than one acre
- Built: 1884
- Architect: Vinal, Arthur H.; et al.
- Architectural style: Romanesque
- NRHP reference No.: 08000793
- Added to NRHP: August 22, 2008

The Joshua Bates School is a historic school building at 731 Harrison Avenue in the South End neighborhood of Boston, Massachusetts. The 2 1/2-story Romanesque Revival brick building was designed by Arthur H. Vinal and built in 1884. It was named for financier and major benefactor of the Boston Public Library Joshua Bates. The school was closed in 1975 as a consequence of court-ordered desegregation actions. It was rehabilitated and adapted for use as artists' studios in 2003.

The building was listed on the National Register of Historic Places in 2008.

The original sea wall for the South End can still be seen on the Harrison Avenue side of its school yard.

American poet James Hercules Sutton attended this school from 1947 to 1951.

== See also ==
- National Register of Historic Places listings in southern Boston, Massachusetts
