= Joshua Bates (financier) =

American international financier (1788–1864)

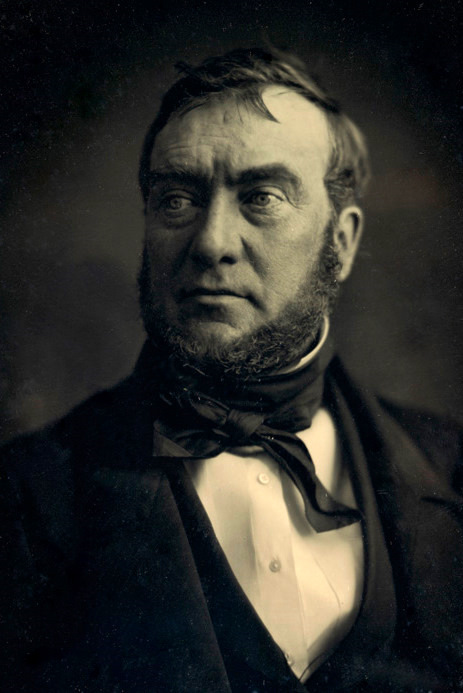
- Daguerreotype of Bates (c. 1850)
- Born: October 10, 1788; Weymouth, Massachusetts, U.S.
- Died: September 24, 1864 (aged 75)
- Spouse: Lucretia Augusta Sturgis
- Children: 2
- Parent(s): Joshua Bates; Tirzah Pratt Bates
- Relatives: Sylvain Van de Weyer (son-in-law)

Joshua Bates (October 10, 1788 – September 24, 1864) was an American international financier who divided his life between the United States and the United Kingdom.

== Early life ==
Bates was born in Commercial St., Weymouth, Massachusetts on October 10, 1788. He was the son of Col. Joshua Bates (1755–1804), who fought in the American Revolutionary War, and Tirzah (née Pratt) Bates (1764–1841). After his father's death in 1804, his mother remarried to Ebenezer Hunt (1760–1832) in 1808. His sister, Nancy Bates, was married to Capt. Warren Weston, the mother of abolitionist Maria Weston Chapman (who Bates paid for her education in London).

His paternal grandparents were Abraham Bates and Sarah (née Tower) Bates.

== Career ==
Early in his career, he worked for William Gray, owner of Gray's Wharf in Charlestown. A merchant and a banker, in 1828 Bates became associated with the great house of Baring Brothers & Co. of London, of which he eventually became the senior partner. He was arbitrator of the commission convened in 1853 to settle the claims of American citizens arising from the War of 1812.

In 1852, he founded the Boston Public Library by giving $50,000 for that purpose (equivalent to $1,935,000 in 2025), with the provision that the interest of the money should be expended for books of permanent value, and that the city should make adequate provision for at least 100 readers. He afterward gave 30,000 volumes to the institution. In his honor, the Boston Central Library's main hall ("Bates Hall") of which is named after him.

Bates was prominent among expatriate Americans in London in the years before and during the Civil War, including diplomats Charles Francis Adams and Henry Adams, and was active in support of the Union cause. As a patron of the arts he commissioned canvases from Thomas Cole, including a nostalgic view of Boston, for his house in Portland Place. The house he built for his daughter and son-in-law (Belgian minister Sylvain Van de Weyer), New Lodge, was near Windsor. As the representative of her uncle Leopold I of Belgium, also an uncle of Albert of Saxe-Coburg and Gotha, Sylvain Van de Weyer and his charming American wife were popular with Victoria and her court.

== Personal life ==
Bates married Lucretia Augusta Sturgis (1787–1863); she was the first cousin of Captain William Sturgis and of Nathaniel Russell Sturgis, both of Boston. Together, they were the parents of:

- William Rufus Gray Bates (1815–1834), who died young.
- Elizabeth Anne Sturgis Bates (1817–1878), who married Belgian Prime Minister Sylvain Van de Weyer.

Bates died on September 24, 1864. He was buried at Kensal Green Cemetery in the London Borough of Brent in England.

=== Descendants ===
Through his daughter Elizabeth, he was the grandfather of seven, including Eleanor Van de Weyer, who married Reginald Baliol Brett, 2nd Viscount Esher (their daughter, Sylvia Brett, married Charles Vyner de Windt Brooke, and became the last Rani of Sarawak); Alice Emma Sturgis van de Weyer, married the Hon. Charles Brand (4th son of Henry Brand, 1st Viscount Hampden).

== Image gallery ==
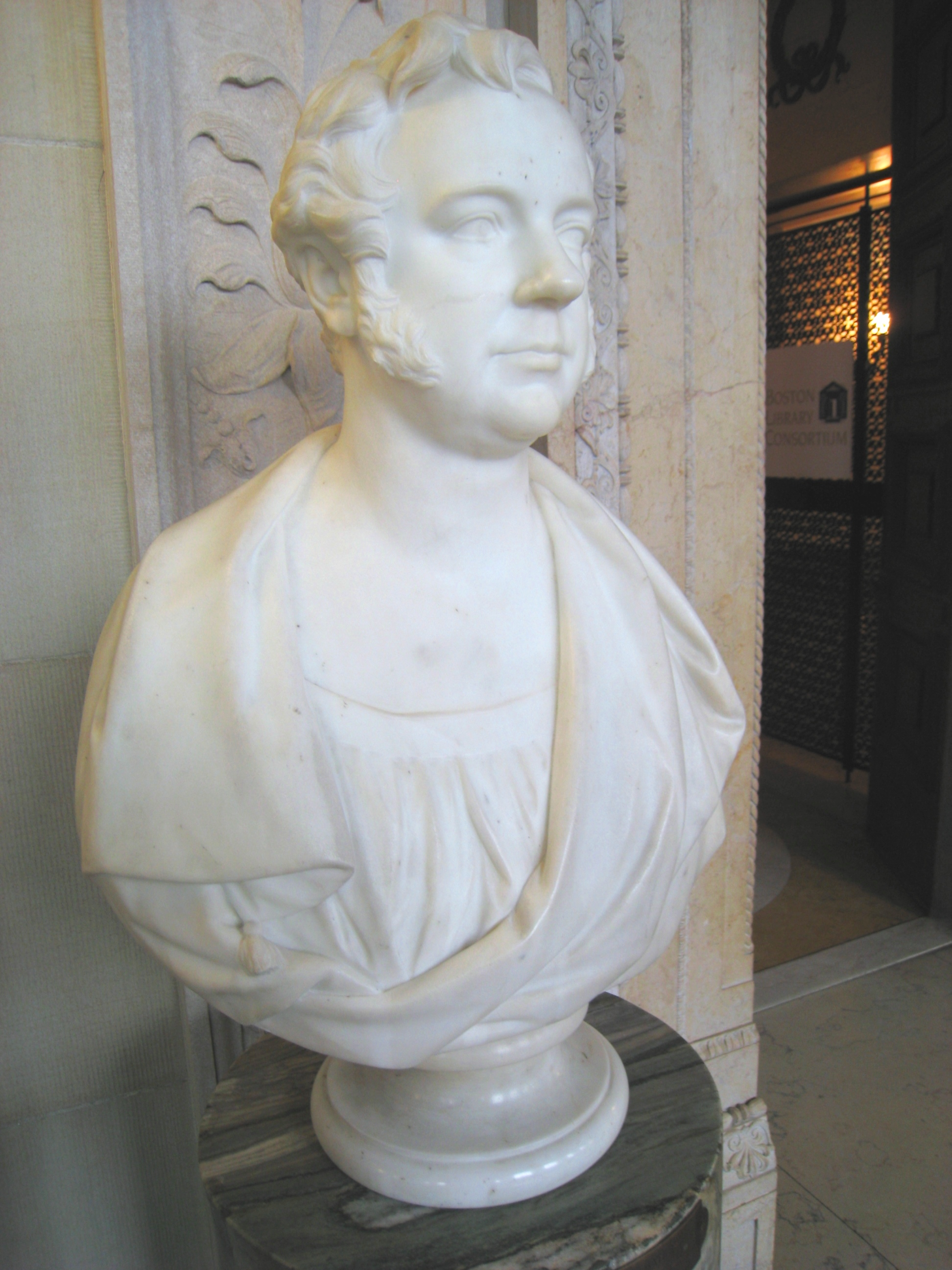
Bust of Bates, in Boston Public Library

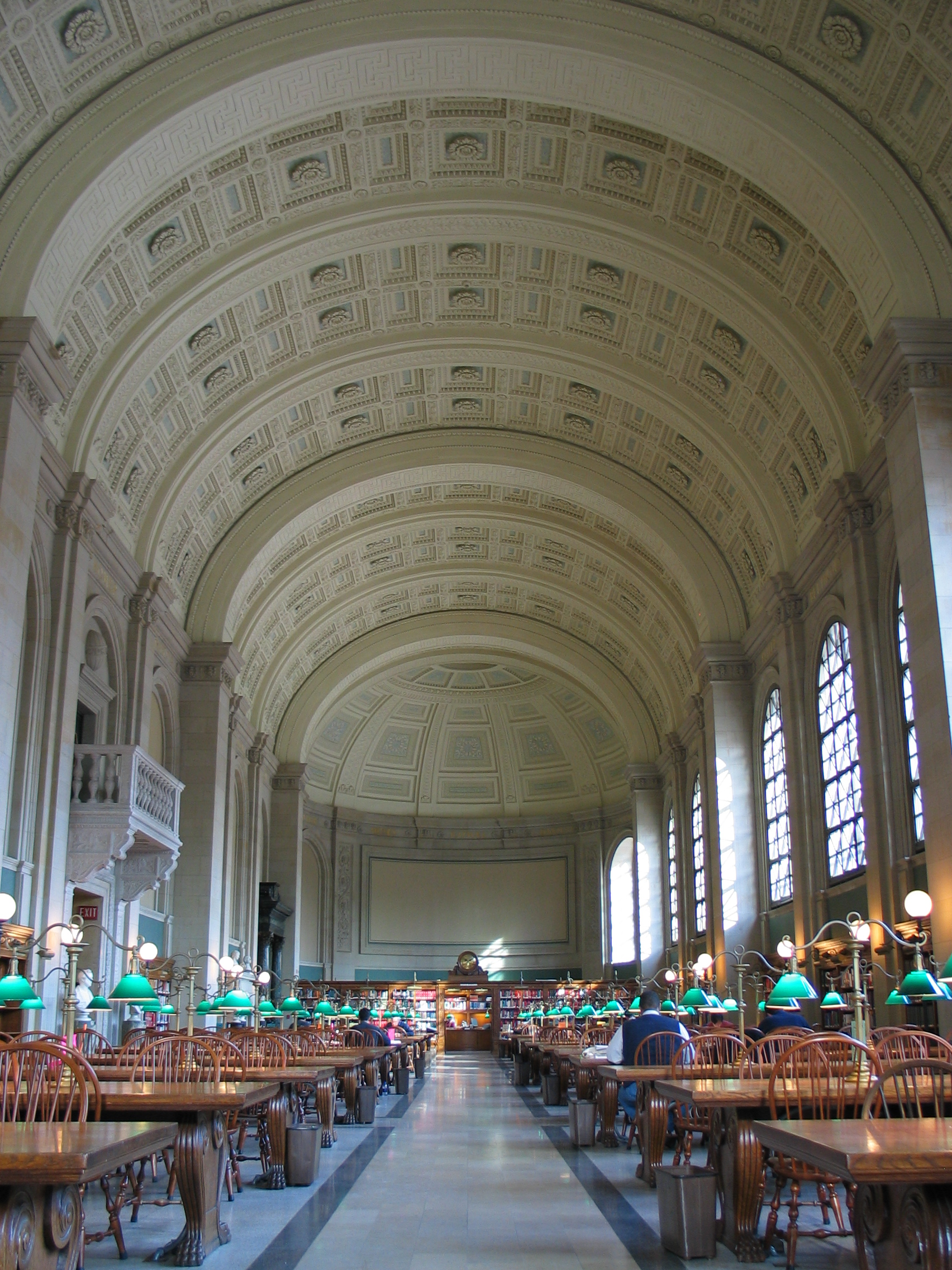
Bates Hall, McKim building, Boston Public Library, named in Bates' honour

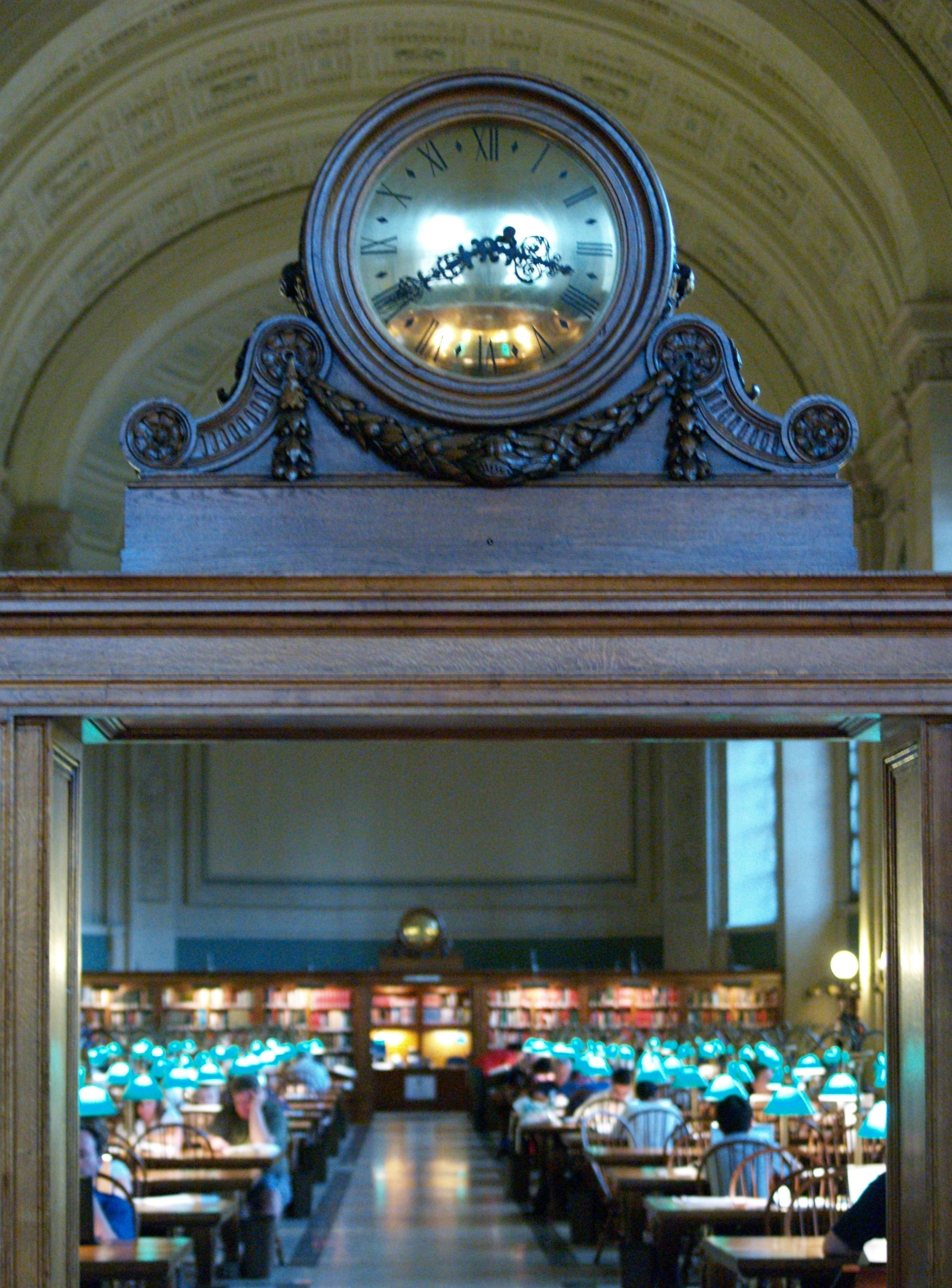
Bates Hall, McKim building, Boston Public Library

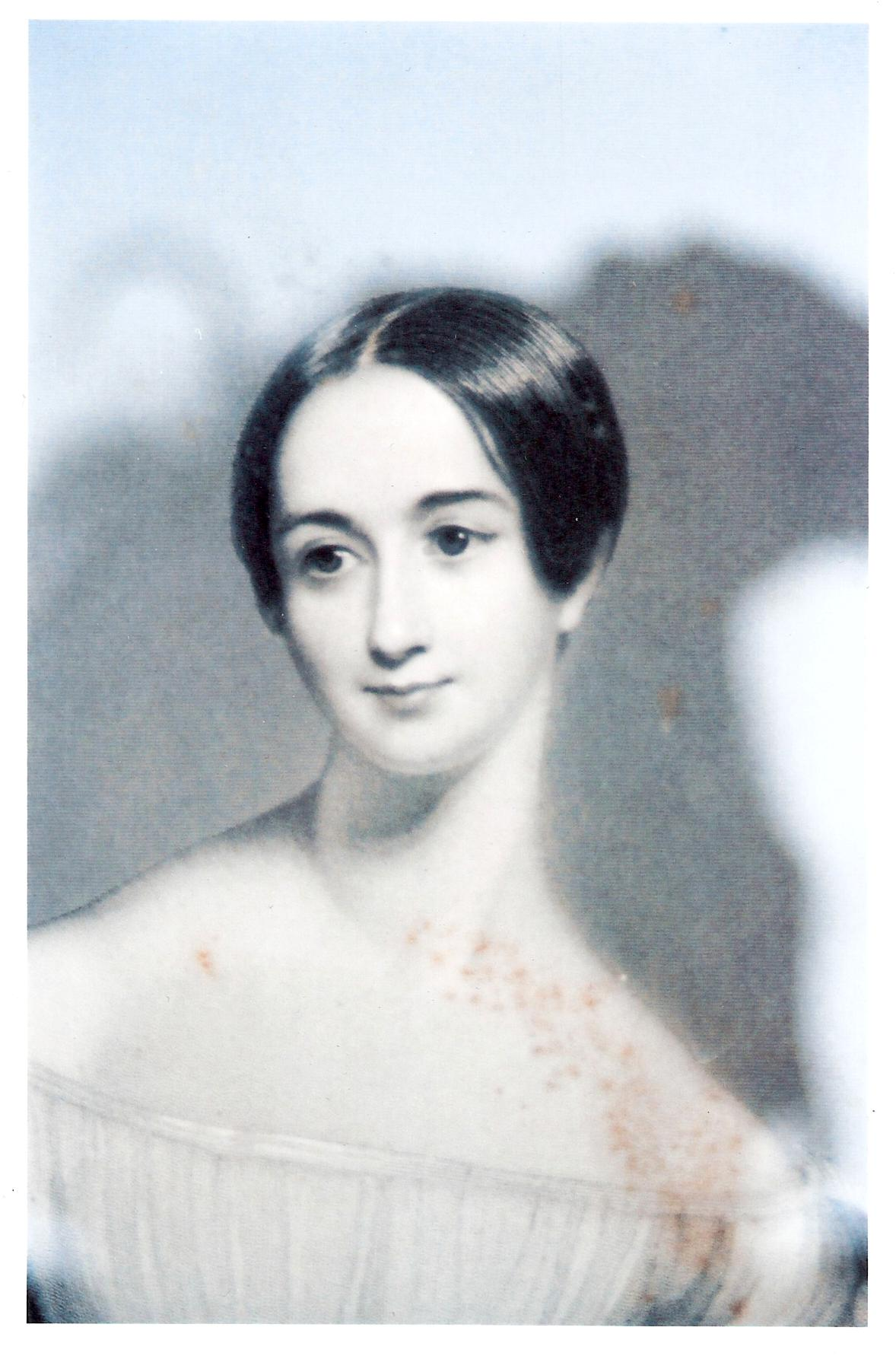
Bates's only daughter Elizabeth, wife to the Belgian minister Sylvain Van de Weyer. Engraving after a portrait by Thomas Sully

== See also ==
- Bates Hall, Boston Public Library, McKim Building
- Joshua Bates School, South End, Boston, Massachusetts

== Publications ==
- Tribute of Boston merchants to the memory of Joshua Bates: October, 1864.
- Memorial of Joshua Bates (Boston, 1865)
- Persuading John Bull: Union and Confederate Propaganda in Britain, 1860–65
