= Henry Bates (British Army officer) =

British army officer

General Sir Henry Bates KCB
- Born: 1813
- Died: 2 March 1893 (aged 79–80); London
- Military career
- Allegiance: United Kingdom
- Branch: British Army
- Rank: General
- Awards: KCB

General Sir Henry Bates KCB (1813 – 2 March 1893) was a senior officer in the British Army.

== Career ==
He was born the eldest son of Major Bates of the Royal Marines and educated at Charterhouse School.

He joined the Army as an ensign 9 July 1829 and was promoted Lieutenant in the 38th Foot in 1833. In 1836 he transferred to the 82nd Foot and was promoted Captain in 1845, having spent 3 years in the West Indies on the staff of Lt.-General Samuel Ford Whittingham. He exchanged to the 98th Foot and became a Major in 1857.

He spent 21 years in India as a staff officer, including terms as aide-de-camp to Sir Robert Henry Dick (killed 1846) and Sir Hugh Gough, 1st Viscount Gough. He also acted as Military Secretary to John Elphinstone, 13th Lord Elphinstone, Governor of Bombay during the Indian Mutiny of 1857.

Made Major-General in 1863 he was put in charge of a brigade at Aldershot Garrison. He was commander in the Cork District during the Fenian Rising of 1866.

In 1871 he was appointed a Commissioner for the abolition of purchase (of officer commissions) in the Army, the following year made Lieutenant-General, and in 1873 awarded C.B.

He was given the colonelcy of the 9th (East Norfolk) Regiment of Foot (subsequently the Norfolk Regiment) in 1871, transferring in 1889 to be Colonel of the Prince of Wales's Volunteers (South Lancashire Regiment), a position he held until his death. He was made a full General on 1 October 1877 and a K.C.B. in 1879. He retired in 1881.

He died at his London home in 1893.

Military offices
Preceded by Sir James Archibald Hope	Colonel of the 9th (East Norfolk) Regiment of Foot; 1871–1889	Succeeded by Sir Artur Borton
Preceded by William Samuel Newton	Colonel of the Prince of Wales's Volunteers (South Lancashire Regiment); 1889–1893	Succeeded by Augustus Henry Lane Fox-Pitt-Rivers
