= Bates House =

Bates House may refer to:

in Canada

- Bate-Fenton House, Sandy Hill, Ottawa, Ontario, also called Bate's House

in New Zealand

- Bates House, heritage building in New Plymouth

in the United States

- Daisy Bates House, Little Rock, Arkansas, listed on the National Register of Historic Places (NRHP)
- Sherman Bates House, Hardy, Arkansas, NRHP-listed
- Sherman and Merlene Bates House, Hardy, Arkansas, NRHP-listed in Sharp County, Arkansas
- Bates-Hendricks House, Indianapolis, Indiana, NRHP-listed
- Elbert-Bates House, Albia, Iowa, NRHP-listed in Monroe County, Iowa
- Bates House (Bedford, Kentucky), NRHP-listed
- Bates Log House, Lexington, Kentucky, NRHP-listed
- David Back Log House and Farm, Letcher County, Kentucky, NRHP-listed
- Levin Bates House, Buechel, LaFayette County, Kentucky, NRHP-listed
- Judge Bates House, Houston, Mississippi, NRHP-listed
- Bates-Geers House, near Plato, Missouri, NRHP-listed in Texas County, Missouri
- Cyrus Bates House, Henderson, Jefferson County, New York, NRHP-listed in Jefferson County, New York
- Rufus and Flora Bates House, Ithaca, New York, NRHP-listed in Tompkins County, New York
- Bates Cobblestone Farmhouse, Middlesex, New York, NRHP-listed in Yates County, New York
- Richardson-Bates House, Oswego, New York, NRHP-listed in Oswego County, New York
- Bates-Englehardt Mansion, St. Johnsville, New York, NRHP-listed in Montgomery County, New York
- Cozad–Bates House, University Circle, Cleveland, Ohio, NRHP-listed
- Bates-Cockrem House, Sandusky, Erie County, Ohio, NRHP-listed
- Bates-Seller House, Portland, Oregon, NRHP-listed
- John M. and Elizabeth Bates House No. 1, NRHP-listed in Portland, Oregon
- John M. and Elizabeth Bates House No. 2, NRHP-listed in Lake Oswego, Oregon
- John M. and Elizabeth Bates House No. 3, NRHP-listed in Lake Oswego, Oregon
- John M. and Elizabeth Bates House No. 4, NRHP-listed in Lake Oswego, Oregon
- William Bates House, in Greenville County near Greenville, South Carolina, NRHP-listed
- Bates-Sheppard House, Cuero, TX, NRHP-listed in De Witt County, Texas
- Martin M. Bates Farmstead, Richmond, Vermont, NRHP-listed in Chittendon County, Vermont
- Bates-Tanner Farm, Bothell, Washington, NRHP-listed in Snohomish County, Washington

== See also ==
- Bates Building, Cincinnati, Ohio, NRHP-listed
- Bates Tourist Court, Marshall, AR, NRHP-listed in Searcy County, Arkansas
- Bates Park Historic District, Des Moines, Iowa, NRHP-listed
- Bates Round Barn, near Greene, New York, NRHP-listed in Chenango County, New York
- Bates Well Ranch, near Ajo, Arizona, NRHP-listed in Pima County, Arizona
- Bates (disambiguation)
- Bates (surname)
