= Bates =

Bates may refer to:

== Places ==
- Bates, Arkansas, an unincorporated community
- Bates, Illinois. an unincorporated community in Sangamon County
- Bates, Michigan, a community in Grand Traverse County
- Bates, New York, a hamlet in the town of Ellington in Chautauqua County
- Bates, Oregon, unincorporated community in Grant County
- Bates County, Missouri, county in Missouri
- Bates Island, Biscoe Islands, Antarctica
- Bates Island (Massachusetts), Island in Lake Chaubunagungamaug
- Bates Point, in Victoria Land, Antarctica
- Bates Pond (Carver, Massachusetts), Twenty-acre pond
- Bates State Park, in Grant County, Oregon
- Bates Township, Michigan, in Iron County

== People ==
- Bates (surname), a common surname
- Bates family, a banking family in the United States and the United Kingdom
- Bates Gill (born 1959), American political scientist
- Bates Lowry (1923–2004), American art historian

== Organizations ==
=== Colleges and universities ===
- Bates College, a liberal arts college founded in 1855 in Lewiston, Maine
- Bates Technical College, a technical college founded in 1940 in Tacoma, Washington
- Bates Theological Seminary, also known as Cobb Divinity School

=== Companies and industries ===
- Bates 141, an advertising agency renamed Bates in 2011
- Bates Mill, a factory founded 1854 in Lewiston, Maine, producing textiles, also the site of an industrial park

== Transportation and vehicles ==
- BATES, an acronym for BAllistic Test and Evaluation System
- Bates (automobile), an automobile manufactured by the Bates Automobile Company
- Bates Monoplane, a pioneering aircraft built by Carl Sterling Bates in 1911

== Other ==
- Bates method, a method of vision improvement
- Bates numbering, a number system for standardized document identification used in the legal, medical, and business fields
- The Bates, a German punk band
- Bates Uniform Footwear, a brand of footwear owned by Wolverine World Wide
- Battlefield Artillery Target Engagement System (BATES), a force-multiplier computer system procured for the British Army from Marconi Electronic Systems

== See also ==
- Bates House (disambiguation)
- Bates Motel (disambiguation)
- Justice Bates (disambiguation)
- Bate (disambiguation)
