= 8B =

8B or VIII-B may refer to:

- AV-8B Harrier II, an aircraft
- Stalag VIII-B, a notorious German Army prisoner of war camp near Lamsdorf
- Caribbean Star Airlines IATA airline designator
- 8b/10b encoding or 6b/8b encoding, in telecommunications, eight bit words
- Bone morphogenetic protein 8b
- Van Biesbroeck 8b, a brown dwarf star
- WASP-8b, an extrasolar planet discovered in 2008
- GCR Class 8B, a class of 25 two-cylinder steam locomotives
- WNT8B, a protein that in humans is encoded by the WNT8B gene
- Boeing XF8B, a single-engine aircraft developed by Boeing
- PDE8B, is an enzyme that in humans is encoded by the PDE8B gene
- HAT-P-8b, an extrasolar planet
- Isotta Fraschini Tipo 8B, an Italian luxury car made between 1931 and 1934
- Boron-8 (^{8}B), an isotope of boron

== See also ==
- B8 (disambiguation)
