= Bate =

Bate may refer to:

== Places ==
- Baté, a village in Hungary
- Bate (Attica), a deme of ancient Attica
- Bate, Burkina Faso, a town in Burkina Faso
- Bate, Nova Gorica, a village in the Municipality of Nova Gorica, Slovenia
- Baté Empire, a pre-colonial state in what is today Guinea
- Bate Islands, Nunavut, Canada

== Other uses ==
- FC BATE Borisov, a top Belarusian football club
- Bating (leather), a substance, often made from fermented animal dung, used to remove hair and the outer protein layer from hide in tanning leather
- Bate (surname), a surname, including notable people with the surname

== See also ==
- B8 (disambiguation)
- Bates (disambiguation)
- Bated breath (disambiguation)
