= Diane Sawyer =

American television broadcast journalist (born 1945)

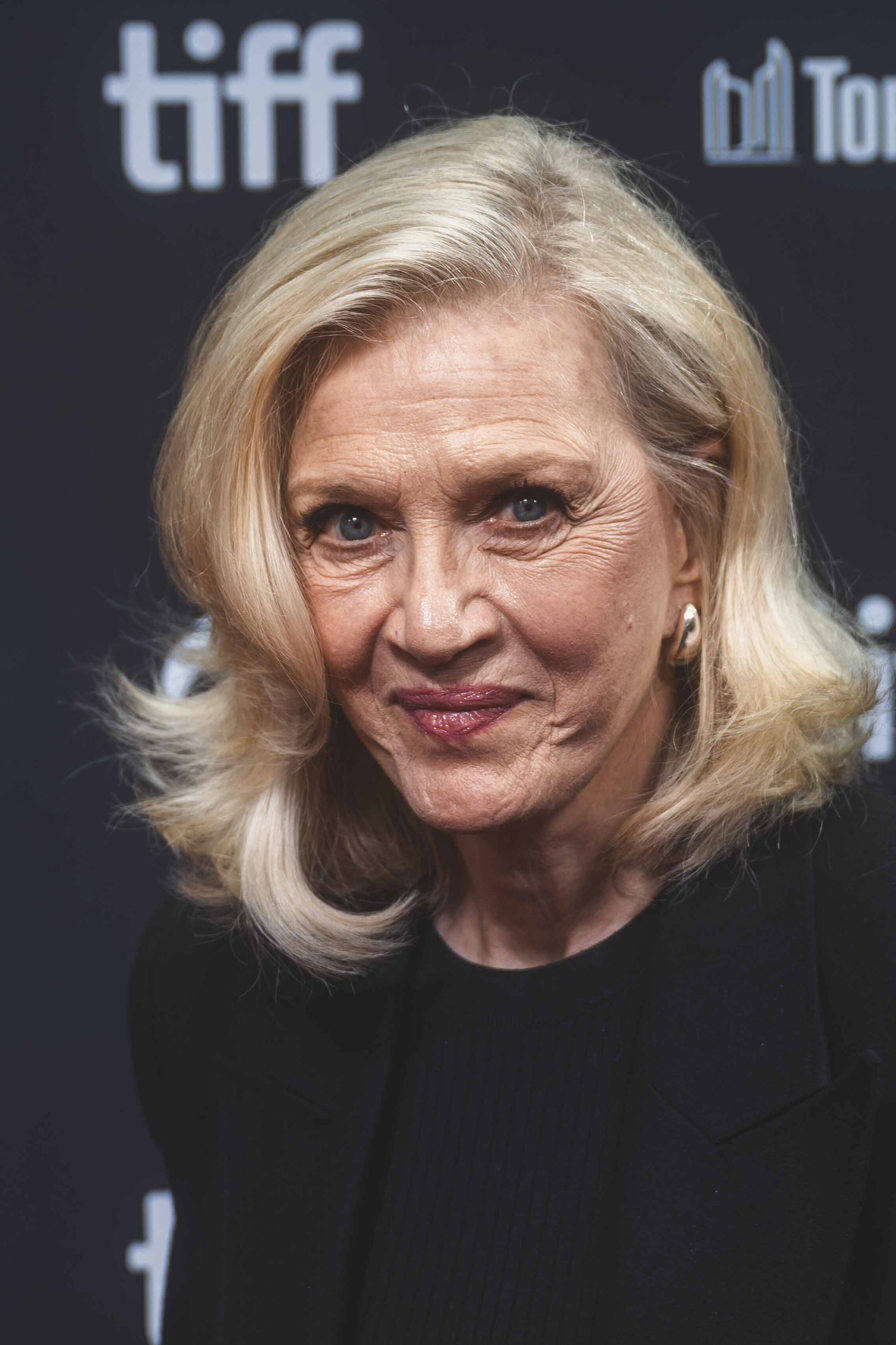
- Sawyer in 2025
- Born: Lila Diane Sawyer; December 22, 1945 (age 80); Glasgow, Kentucky, U.S.
- Education: Wellesley College (BA)
- Occupation: Television journalist
- Years active: 1962–present
- Known for: Broadcast anchor of Good Morning America and ABC World News Tonight
- Spouse: Mike Nichols (m. 1988; died 2014)

Lila Diane Sawyer (/ˈsɔːjər/; born December 22, 1945) is an American television broadcast journalist known for anchoring major programs on two networks including ABC World News Tonight, Good Morning America, 20/20, and Primetime newsmagazine while at ABC News. During her tenure at CBS News, she hosted CBS Morning and was the first woman correspondent on 60 Minutes. Prior to her journalism career, she was a member of U.S. president Richard Nixon's White House staff and assisted in his post-presidency memoirs. Sawyer works for ABC News producing documentaries and interview specials.

== Early life ==
Sawyer was born in Glasgow, Kentucky, to Jean W. (née Dunagan), an elementary school teacher, and Erbon Powers "Tom" Sawyer, a county judge. Her ancestry includes English, Irish, Scots-Irish, and German. She has an older sister, Linda. Soon after her birth, her family moved to Louisville, where her father rose to local prominence as a Republican politician and community leader. He was Kentucky's Jefferson County Judge/Executive when he was killed in a car accident on Louisville's Interstate 64 in 1969. E. P. "Tom" Sawyer State Park, in the Frey's Hill area of Louisville, is named in his honor.

Sawyer attended Seneca High School in the Buechel area of Louisville. She served as an editor-in-chief for her school yearbook, The Arrow, and participated in many artistic activities. In her senior year of high school in 1963, she won the annual America's Junior Miss scholarship pageant representing Kentucky. She won by her strength of poise in the final interview and her essay comparing the music of the North and the South during the Civil War. From 1963 to 1965, Sawyer toured the country as America's Junior Miss to promote the Coca-Cola Pavilion at the 1964–1965 New York World's Fair. She had dreaded travelling around the country as America's Junior Miss, but it taught her to think on her feet with poise and grace. Sawyer attended Wellesley College, graduating in 1967.

== Career ==
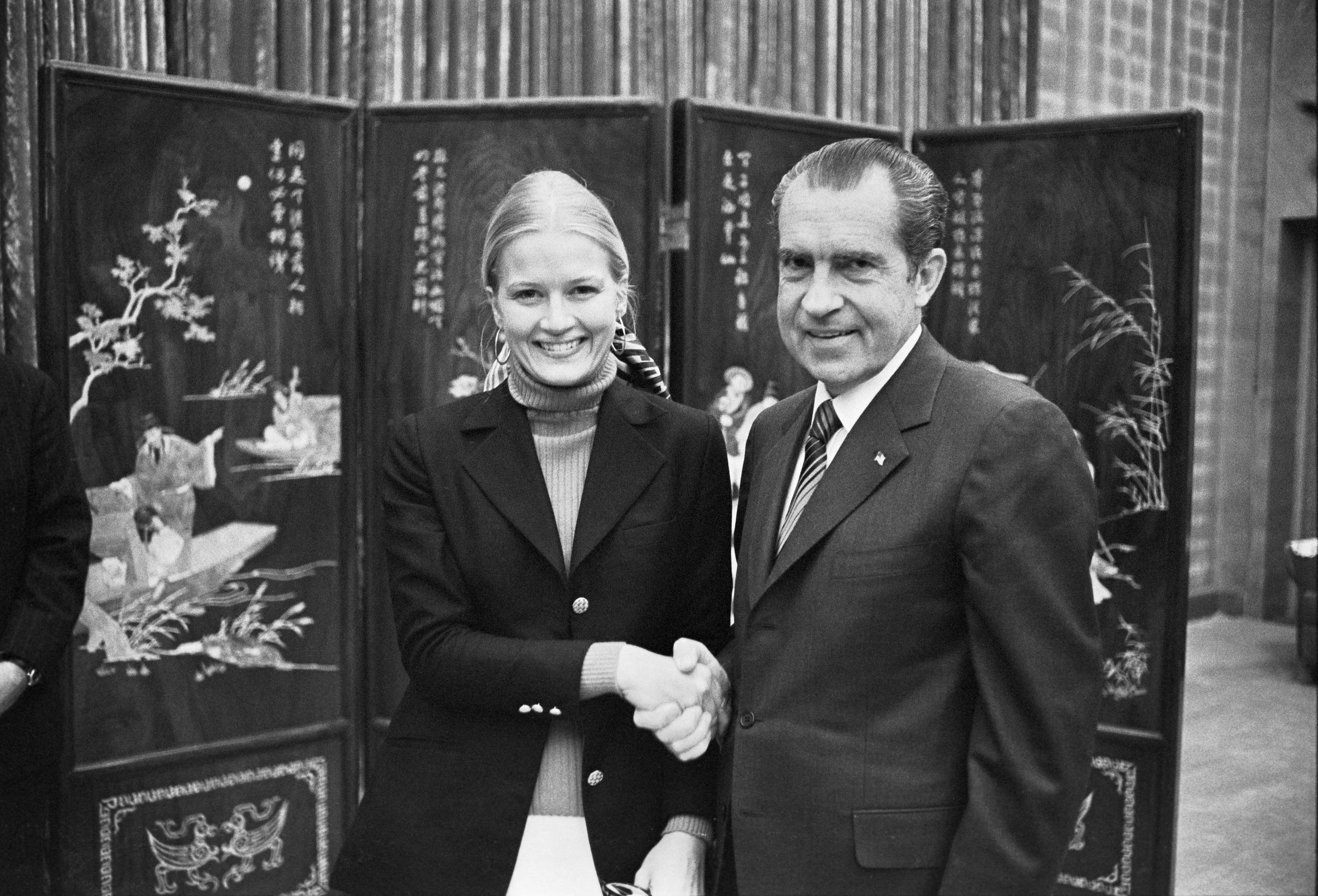
Sawyer with President Richard Nixon in 1972

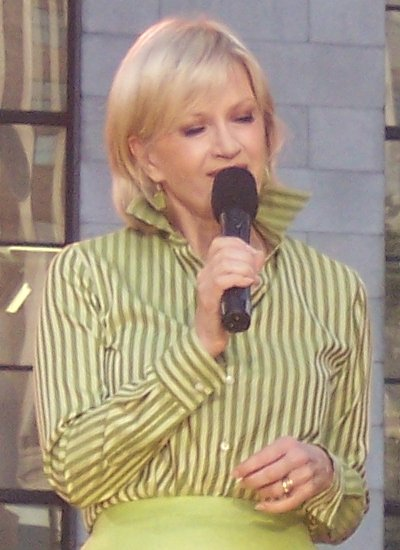
Sawyer on set of Good Morning America in 2004

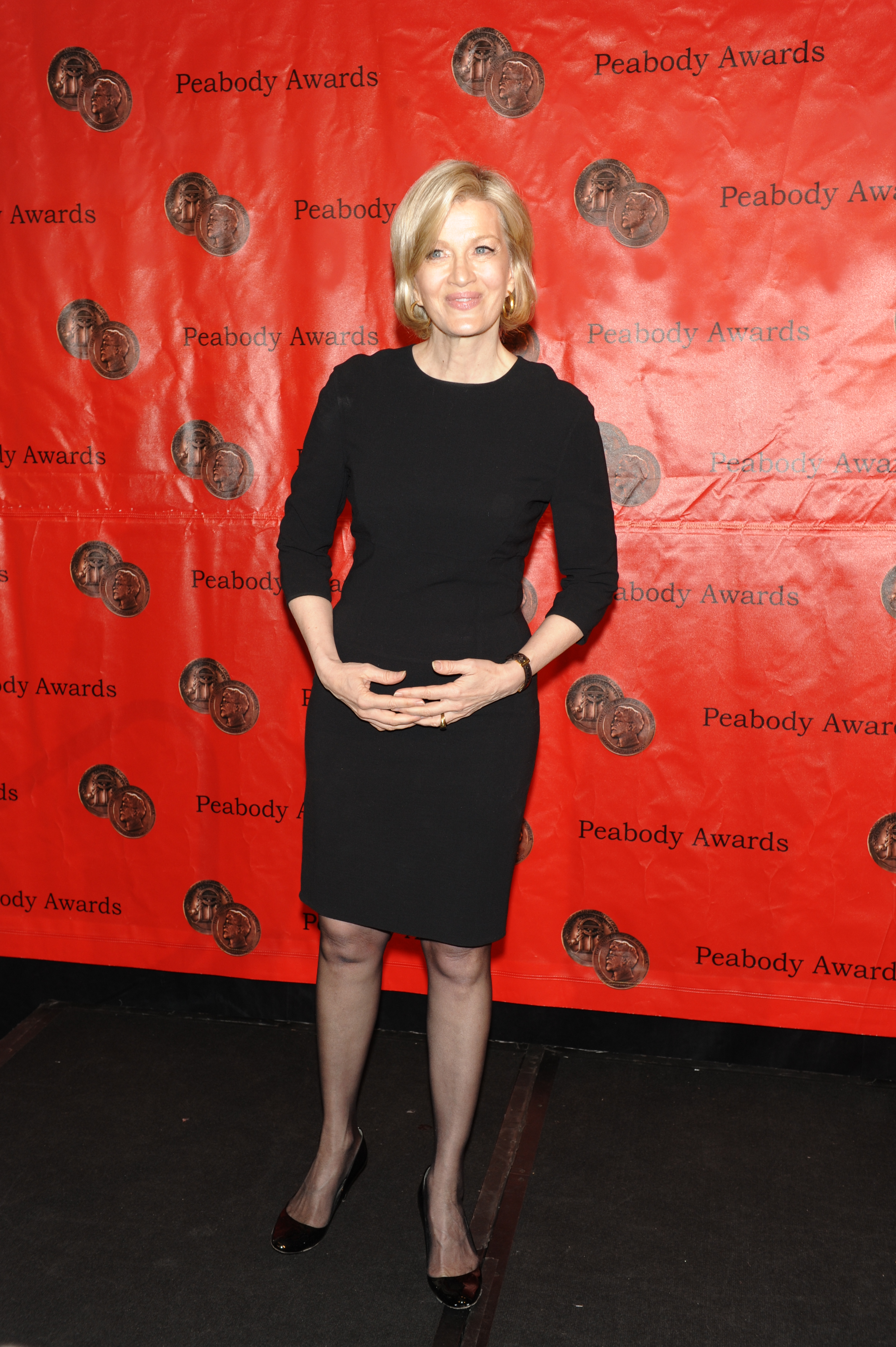
Sawyer at the 2010 Peabody Awards

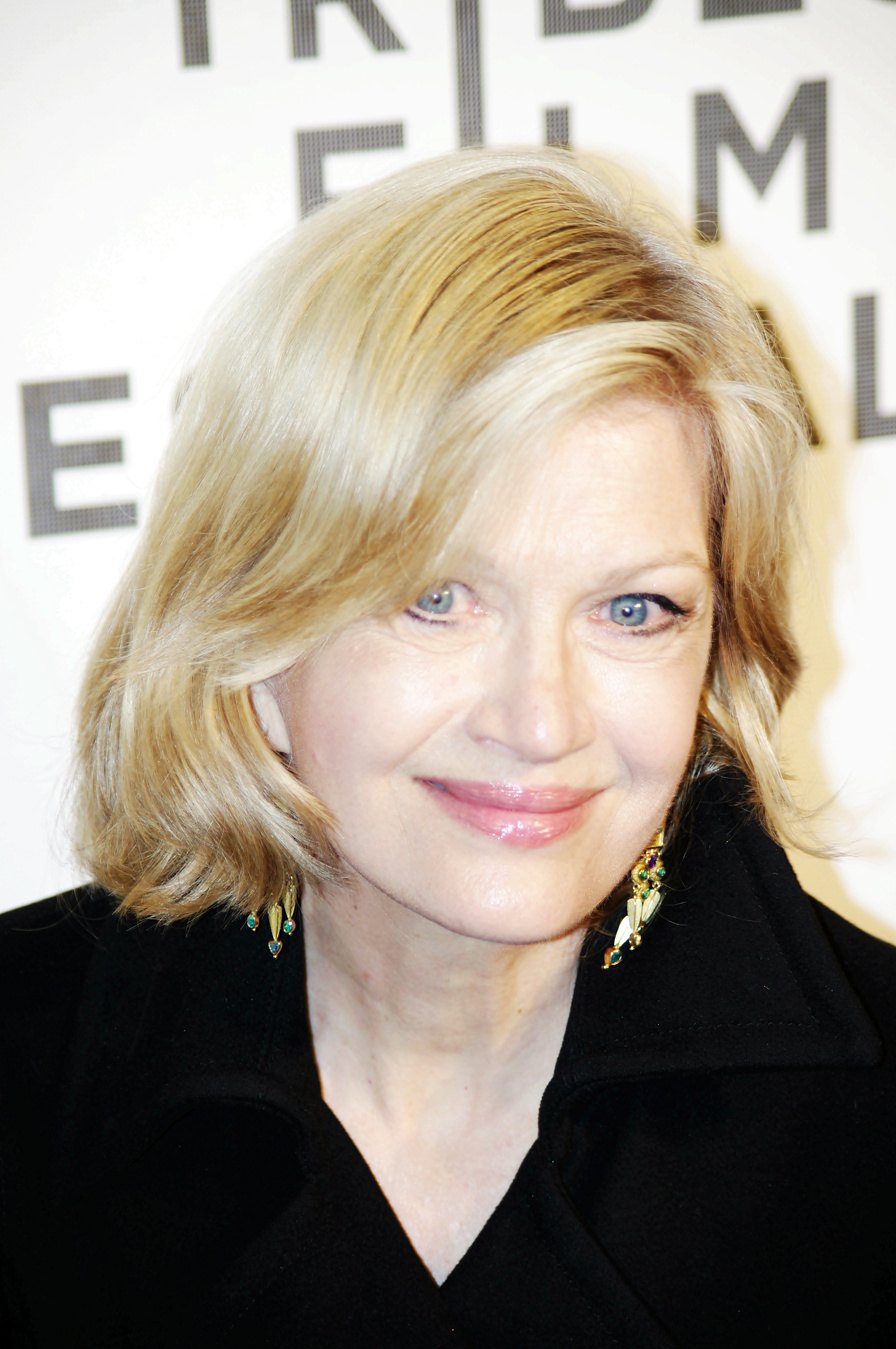
Sawyer at the 2011 Tribeca Film Festival premiere of Jesus Henry Christ

Immediately after her graduation, Sawyer returned to Kentucky and was employed as a weather forecaster for WLKY-TV in Louisville. In Sawyer's opinion, the weather was boring, so she would occasionally add quotes to keep it interesting. Finally, Sawyer was promoted to a general-assignment post, but this did not sustain her interest for long. In 1970, Sawyer moved to Washington, D.C., and, unable to find work as a broadcast journalist, she interviewed for positions in government offices. She eventually became an assistant to Jerry Warren, the White House deputy press secretary. Initially, Sawyer wrote press releases and quickly graduated to other tasks like drafting some of President Richard Nixon's public statements. Within a few months, she became an administrative assistant to White House Press Secretary Ron Ziegler and eventually rose to become a staff assistant for U.S. president Richard Nixon. In 1973 when John Dean testified to the Senate Watergate Committee concerning Nixon's involvement in the Watergate coverup, Sawyer and Larry Speakes were assigned to the staff of Nixon's lawyer J. Fred Buzhardt for a project to "prove" that Dean was lying. Speakes later claimed that he had come to the conclusion that Dean had not lied, and that he informed Sawyer, but they continued their efforts.

Sawyer continued through Nixon's resignation from the presidency in 1974 and worked on the Nixon-Ford transition team in 1974–1975, after which she followed Nixon to California and helped him write RN: The Memoirs of Richard Nixon, published in 1978. She also helped prepare Nixon for his famous set of television interviews with journalist David Frost in 1977.

Years later, Sawyer would be suspected of being Deep Throat, the source of leaks of classified information to journalist Bob Woodward during the Watergate scandal. In 2005, Deep Throat was identified as W. Mark Felt, but prior to that, Rabbi Baruch Korff – a longtime Nixon confidant and defender known as "Nixon's rabbi" – said on his deathbed that he believed Sawyer was Deep Throat. Sawyer laughed it off and became one of six people to request and receive a public denial from Woodward.

When Sawyer came back to Washington, D.C., in 1978, she joined CBS News as a general-assignment reporter. She was promoted to political correspondent in February 1980 and featured on the weekday broadcasts of Morning with Charles Kuralt. When CBS expanded its morning news show from 60 to 90 minutes, Sawyer was announced as co-anchor on May 13, 1981, by the president of CBS News. With her debut on September 28, 1981, she put her own stamp on the broadcast. The ratings for the show were boosted upon Sawyer's arrival, but the improvement did not last and, after Kuralt left the show, he was replaced by Bill Kurtis. The ratings decreased further, and Sawyer asked to be reassigned in 1984. From 1982 to 1984, Sawyer was also seen with Kurtis on the CBS Early Morning News airing an hour earlier on most CBS affiliates.

In 1984, she became the first female correspondent on 60 Minutes, a CBS News investigative-television newsmagazine.

In 1989, she moved to ABC News to co-anchor Primetime Live newsmagazine with Sam Donaldson. She and Donaldson co-anchored Primetime Live from 1989 to 1998 and its successor, 20/20 Wednesday, from 1998 to 2000. Sawyer also co-anchored a Sunday edition of 20/20 with Barbara Walters from 1998 to 1999.

On January 18, 1999, Sawyer returned to morning news as the co-anchor of Good Morning America with Charles Gibson. The assignment was putatively temporary, but her success in the position, measured by a close in the gap with front-runner Today, NBC News' morning program, sustained her in the position for nearly eleven years.

In 2000, Sawyer returned as co-anchor of Primetime TV newsmagazine (later Primetime Thursday), with Gibson replacing Donaldson. Sawyer was the first to announce to Good Morning America viewers that the first plane crashed into the World Trade Center on September 11, 2001. In 2004, when the show's title was changed to its original name, Primetime Live, a new executive producer was hired, and the newsmagazine format was changed to investigative reporting with Sawyer rotating as the co-anchor with Chris Cuomo, Cynthia McFadden, and John Quiñones. In 2005, the show was retitled Primetime, and Sawyer left the show at the end of 2006 when its format again changed, with a sub-series focus.

Sawyer achieved worldwide acclaim after subjecting Mel Gibson to an intense television interrogation, after his 2006 DUI arrest. On September 2, 2009, Sawyer was announced as the successor to Charles Gibson, who retired as the anchor of ABC World News, on Friday, December 18, 2009. Sawyer left GMA on December 11, 2009, and was scheduled to become the ABC World News anchor in January 2010. However, on December 1, 2009, The New York Times reported that, instead of moving to ABC World News in January 2010, Sawyer would start on December 21, 2009, three days after Gibson's departure. For over a year (2010–2011), with Katie Couric as then anchor of CBS Evening News, two of the three network news anchors on broadcast television were women. Ratings initially rose 8% after Sawyer's first four weeks, averaging 8.8 million viewers.

She signed off at the end of her nightly broadcast with "I'll see you right back here tomorrow night." The show, like the competing evening newscasts, ended the year with ratings 14% below that of the preceding year. Until 2014 she was the anchor of ABC's flagship broadcast World News and the network's principal anchor for breaking-news coverage, election coverage, and special events.

On June 25, 2014, it was announced that she would step down from the anchor chair at ABC World News in September 2014. She remained with ABC News to focus on creating specials and conducting high-profile interviews.

=== Career timeline ===
- 1967–70: WLKY-TV news and weather reporter and teacher in Louisville, Kentucky.
- 1970–74: White House press aide
- 1974–78: Literary assistant to President Richard Nixon
- 1978–81: CBS News reporter and correspondent
- 1981–84: Morning with Charles Kuralt/The CBS Morning News co-anchor
- 1982–84: CBS Early Morning News co-anchor
- 1984–89: 60 Minutes correspondent
- 1989–98: Primetime Live co-anchor
- 1998–present: 20/20 correspondent
- 1998–2000: 20/20 co-anchor
- January 18, 1999 – December 11, 2009: Good Morning America co-anchor
- 2000–06: Primetime co-anchor
- December 21, 2009 –August 27, 2014: ABC World News anchor
- September 2014–present: ABC News special contributor

=== Recognition ===
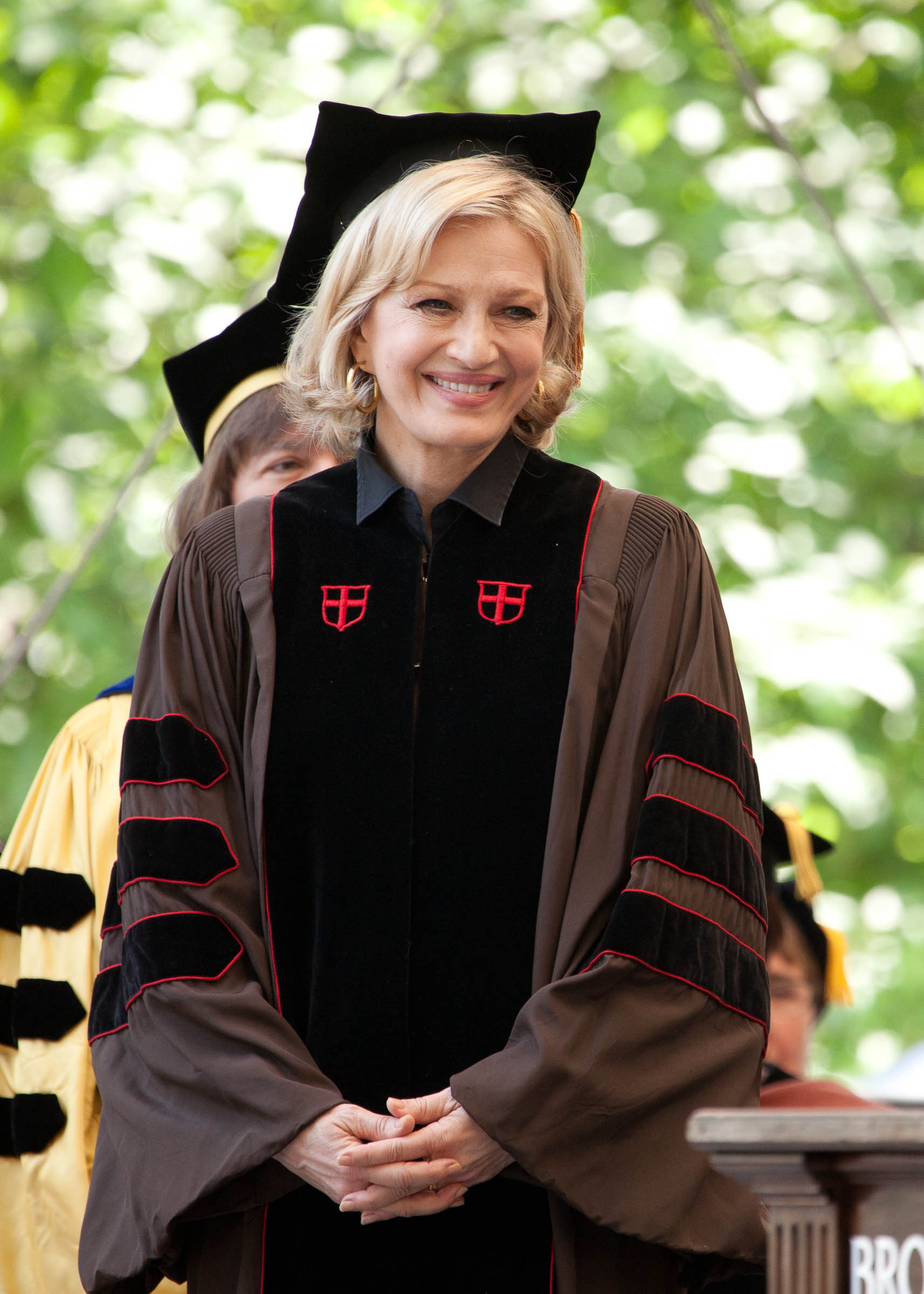
Sawyer receiving an Honorary degree from Brown University in 2012

- 1987, received the Golden Plate Award of the American Academy of Achievement
- 1997, inducted into the Television Hall of Fame.
- 2000, Daytime Emmy Award for excellence in morning programming.
- 2001, named one of the thirty most-powerful women in America by the Ladies' Home Journal.
- since 2004, frequently selected for the annual Forbes Magazine's List of The World's 100 Most Powerful Women which reported that, between June 2005 and June 2008, she made approximately $12 million, solely from entertainment income.
- 2007, Emmy Award for outstanding news and documentary program achievement – programs and segments
- 2009, received a Peabody Award for her work on "A Hidden America: Children of the Mountains."
- 2007, granted a Robert F. Kennedy Journalism Award for "A Call to Action: Saving Our Children" segment on ABC News.
- 2010, won the Walter Cronkite Award for Excellence in Journalism.
- 2012, received an honorary Doctorate of Letters from Brown University
- 2019, named a Disney Legend, an award given to those who've made an outstanding contribution to the legacy of Walt Disney.

== Personal life ==
Sawyer dated future politician Bill Bradley as a college student. She was in relationships with Frank Gannon, aide to President Richard Nixon, as well as American diplomat Richard Holbrooke, and actor Warren Beatty.

On April 29, 1988, she married film and theatre director, producer, and actor Mike Nichols. Nichols had two daughters and a son from previous marriages. He died on November 19, 2014, at the age of 83.

The "List of The World's 100 Most Powerful Women" in Forbes magazine reported that, between June 2005 and June 2008, Sawyer made approximately $12 million, solely from entertainment income.

== See also ==
- New Yorkers in journalism

Media offices
Preceded by Charles Gibson	ABC World News anchor December 21, 2009 – August 27, 2014	Succeeded by David Muir
Preceded by Kevin Newman and Lisa McRee	Good Morning America co-anchor January 18, 1999 – December 11, 2009 with Charles Gibson (from January 18, 1999, to June 28, 2006), and Robin Roberts (from May 23, 2005, to December 11, 2009)	Succeeded by George Stephanopoulos and Robin Roberts
