= Henry Bate =

Henry Bate may refer to:

- Henry Bate of Mechelen (1246–after 1310), Flemish philosopher, theologian, astronomer, astrologer, poet, and musician
- Henry Bate (politician) (1881–1967), Australian politician
- Henry Newell Bate (1828–1917), Canadian industrialist

== See also ==
- Sir Henry Bate Dudley (1745–1824), British minister
