= Bate-Fenton House =

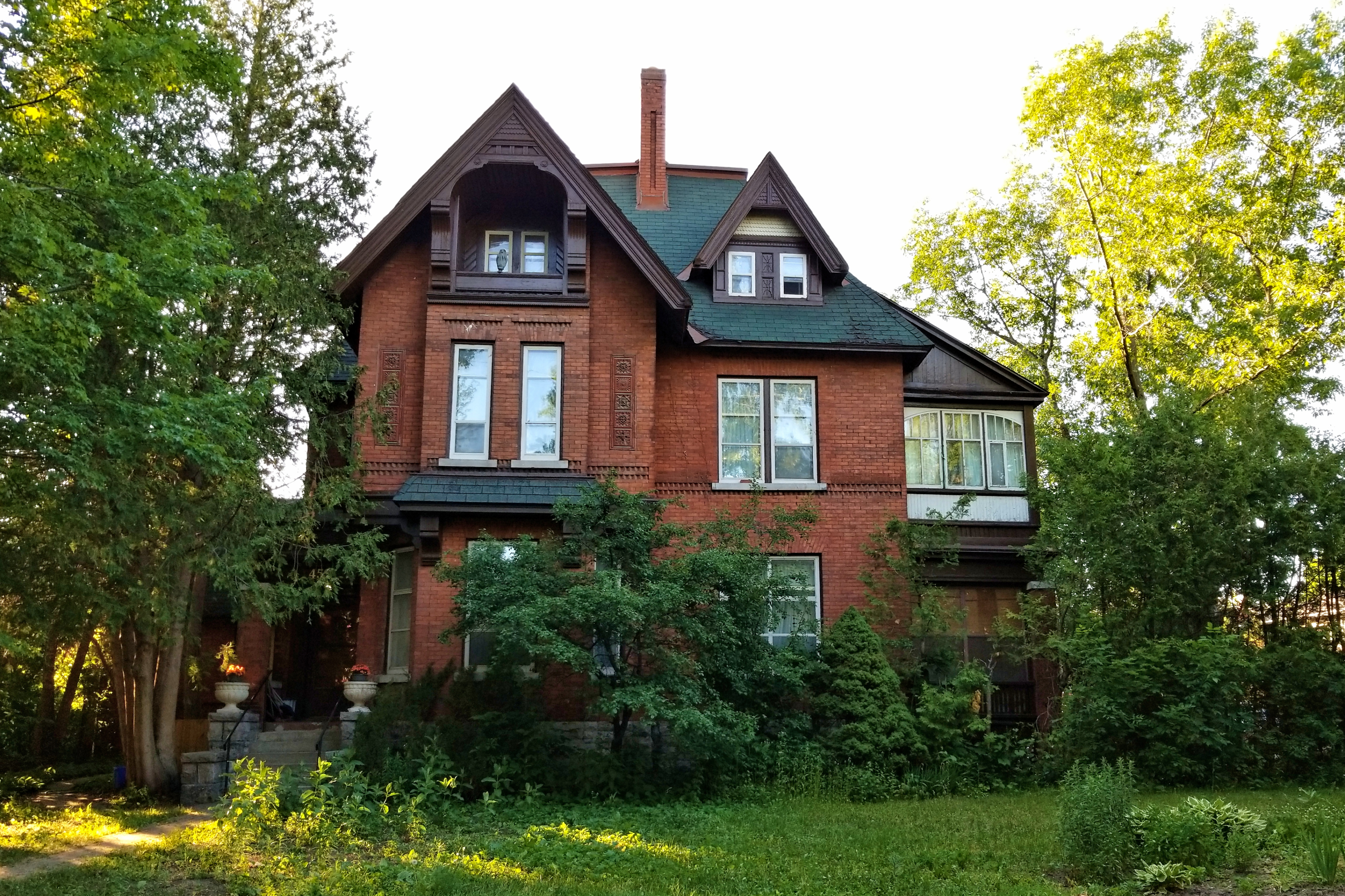

- Location within Ottawa
- Alternative names: Bate's House

General information
- Type: Manor
- Architectural style: Victorian
- Location: Ottawa, Ontario, 455 Wilbrod Street
- Coordinates: 45.429699°N 75.676151°W
- Completed: 1895
- Affiliation: Wilbrod Street Heritage Conservation District

The Bate-Fenton House (or Bate's House) was a prominent heritage example of Canadian Victorian architecture situated on Embassy Row in Sandy Hill, Ottawa near Strathcona Park. It was described as the "homestead property" of the influential Bate family. The house was destroyed by a fire in September 2026.

== History ==
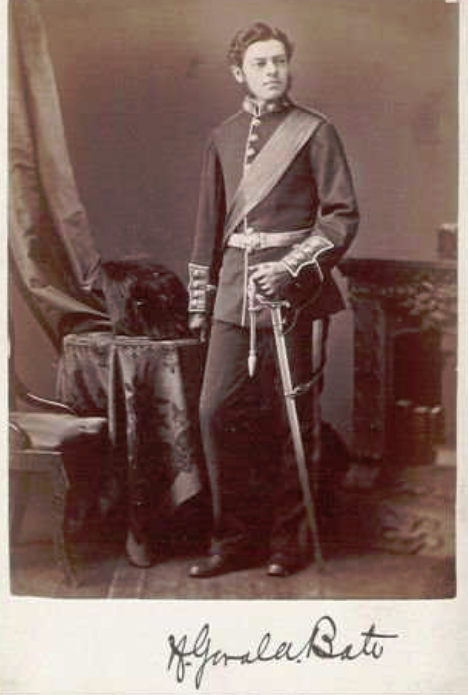
Hermine Gerald Bate as a young man

Hermine Gerald was one of eleven children of the entrepreneur and head of the Ottawa Improvement Commission, Henry Newell Bate. Henry Newell had previously built a house, "elaborate even for its time, sparing no decorative detail" at 318 Fraser St in 1875, and the nearby Bate Island at the Champlain Bridge was named for him.

Gerald noted the approximate costs of his intended construction in the 1893 Ottawa Journal as an initial $15,000, with a 24x35 "addition" costing $3,500, and a two-storey 48x22 horse stable costing $3000. Construction began on the house in 1894 and was completed in 1895 by Major Hermine Gerald Bate, who had previously been living at 216 Chapel St.

While Gerald, a veteran of the Fenian Raids and the North-West Rebellion, lived at the Bate's House at 455 Wilbrod St, his brother Harry lived at 440, his brother Thomas at 469 and his sister Claudia at 396. In 1909, the residence was listed as the headquarters for "H. N. Bate & Sons Wholesale Grocers".

When Gerald's wife, Katherine Mabel Bate, died on January 5, 1924, the Anglican funeral procession left from 455 Wilbrod St to All Saints Anglican Church which had been built by his father whose realty company he ran. In addition to noting the presence of prominent Canadians such as former Prime Minister Robert Borden, Secretary of State George Halsey Perley and Chief Justice Francis Alexander Anglin, the Ottawa Citizen also printed the names of all 94 individuals who brought flowers. She left nearly $250,000, evenly split between their three children.

The architect Werner Noffke drew up construction plans for a new Sandy Hill residence of Gerald Bate's son G. Aldous Bate in 1930 at 32 Range Road, which are today kept in the National Archives of Canada. The Ottawa Citizen ran a story when G. Aldous Bate received a $2–3 fine "for a breach of parking regulations", identifying him as now living at the Range Road property.

In November 1934, Gerald Bate died following three weeks of illness during which he didn't leave the house, leaving a substantial estate evaluated at $747,527.78 (equal to $14,161,498.50 in 2019) which was apportioned between his two sons and his only surviving daughter Marjorie St. Helene Fenton, who had married Major William Seabright Fenton. The newspapers reported on the probate of his will by executors Hill, Hill and Maclaren, in which "Mrs. Fenton receives his homestead property at 455 Wilbrod Street, together with all household goods, furniture and other chattels", and his obituary noted he was "associated with many of the leading enterprises of the capital, particularly in the field of real estate, he was one of the best-known figures in the life of the city".

As Marjorie and her husband Major Fenton took control of the property, they employed Louise Healey, Margaret (Madge) Hood and Theresa Glisinski as maids. By 1968, they had retained Healey and Hood, and also hired Florence Nichols as the live-in cook. In 1948, their 30-year-old son GB Fenton, who had returned from tank warfare in the Second World War, wrote away to the Famous Fantastic Mysteries magazine, ask readers interested in purchasing The King in Yellow, The Man Who Mastered Time, The Island of Captain Sparrow, The Maracot Deep or Morning Star, to contact him at the Bate-Fenton House. GB Fenton married Elisabeth Anne Slattery in January 1950. On November 11, 1970, Lt. Colonel William Fenton died.

The building served as the headquarters of the Iraqi-Canadian Friendship Association.

On September 18, 2026, a fire destroyed the home.

== Description of the property ==
In 1952, the Ottawa Citizen ran an article "The Bates Were Into Everything", in which they noted the Bate-Fenton House as "a large impressive house on Wilbrod Street".

In 2003, the "Western Canada Handbook" mistakenly identified the house as the Austrian embassy, which is actually adjacent to it. The Bate-Fenton House currently operates as a bed and breakfast.

In 2017, a Cultural Heritage Impact Assessment noted the Bate-Fenton House was surrounded with tall cedar hedges around the property.

It is included in the Wilbrod Street Heritage Conservation District.
