= Springhurst =

Springhurst is the name of several geographic locations:

- Springhurst, Victoria, Australia
  - Springhurst railway station
- Springhurst, Louisville, Kentucky, United States of America
