= E. P. "Tom" Sawyer State Park =

State park in Kentucky, United States

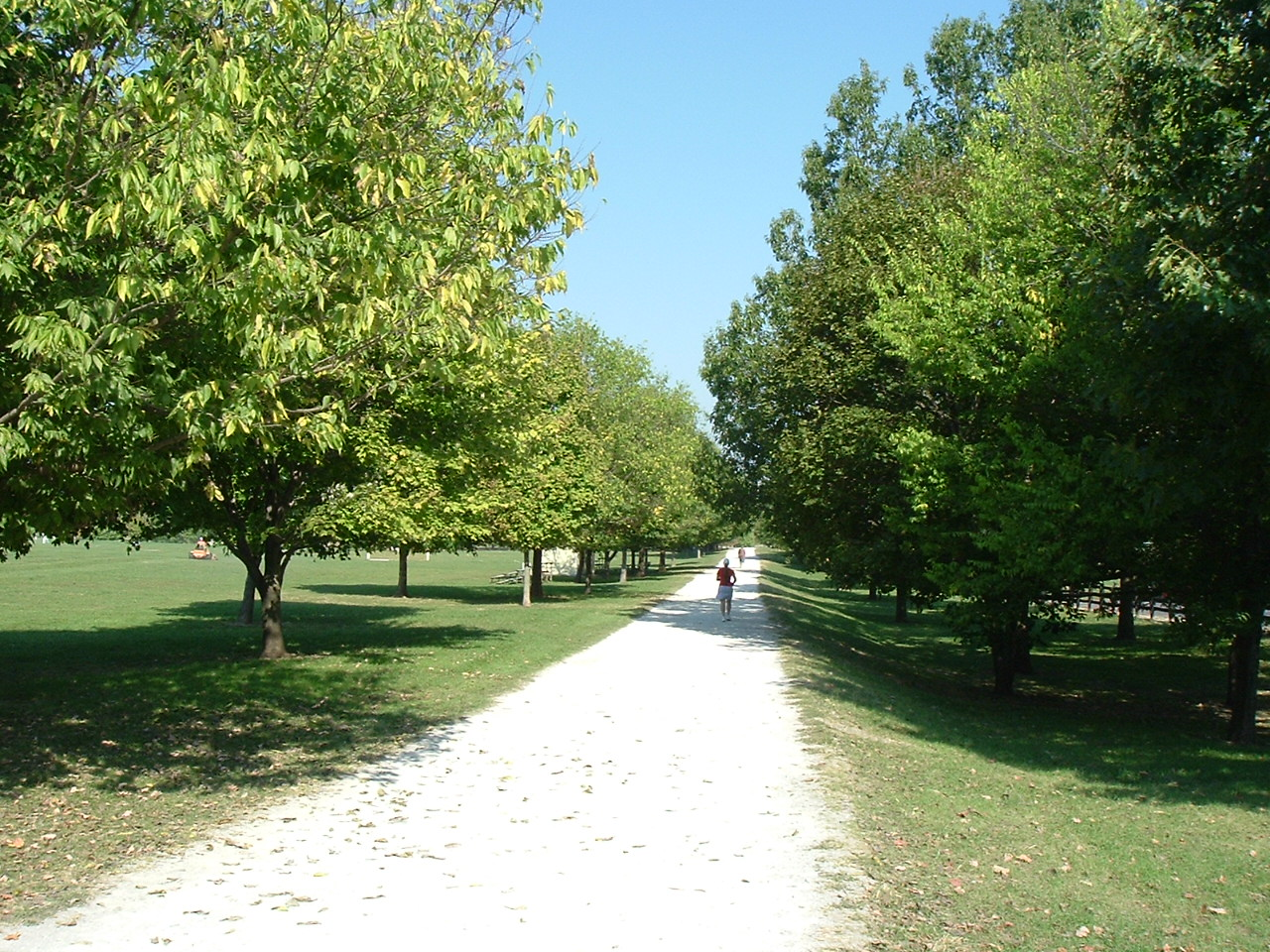
- A walking path in E.P. Sawyer State Park

- Location within Kentucky Location within the United States
- Type: Kentucky state park
- Location: Louisville, Kentucky
- Coordinates: 38°16′39″N 85°33′31″W
- Area: 550 acres (220 ha)
- Elevation: 679 feet (207 m)
- Opened: 1974
- Operator: Kentucky Department of Parks
- Open: Year-round
- Website: Official website

E. P. "Tom" Sawyer State Park is a 550-acre (220 ha) Kentucky state park located in the Freys Hill area of Louisville, Kentucky, on former land of Kentucky's old Central State Hospital. When opened in 1974, it was named in honor of Republican Jefferson County Judge/Executive Erbon Powers "Tom" Sawyer (18 November 1915 - 23 September 1969), who was killed five years before in a car accident on Louisville's Interstate 64 in 1969 at age 53 while still in office. Judge Sawyer was the father of journalist / television news anchor Diane Sawyer (born 1945, at CBS News and later ABC News).

== Activities and amenities ==
The park's amenities include an activities center with a gymnasium that has indoor courts for badminton, basketball, and volleyball as well as an Olympic-sized swimming pool and weight room. The park also has 6 tennis courts, 16 pickleball courts, 14 soccer fields, 3 lighted softball fields, a mile-long fitness trail, a 1¼ mile nature trail, a permanent BMX track, a model aircraft airfield, a dog park, playgrounds, and picnic facilities. It also includes a small archery range with target distances of 10, 20, 30, and 40 yards and 10 and 15 meters. The park is also the site of the Louisville Astronomical Society's "Urban Astronomy Center."

== In the news ==
In 2004, three decades after E. P. "Tom" Sawyer State Park opened in 1974, Louisville City officials suggested that Otter Creek Park, a 2,600-acre (1,100 ha) city-operated park lying outside of Louisville's city limits, become a state park in an exchange for E. P. "Tom" Sawyer State Park becoming a city park. Six years later, in 2010, the state took over the city's Otter Creek Park in a separate deal and it reopened the following year in 2011 after renovations and improvements as an outdoor recreation area operated by the Kentucky Department of Fish and Wildlife Resources.

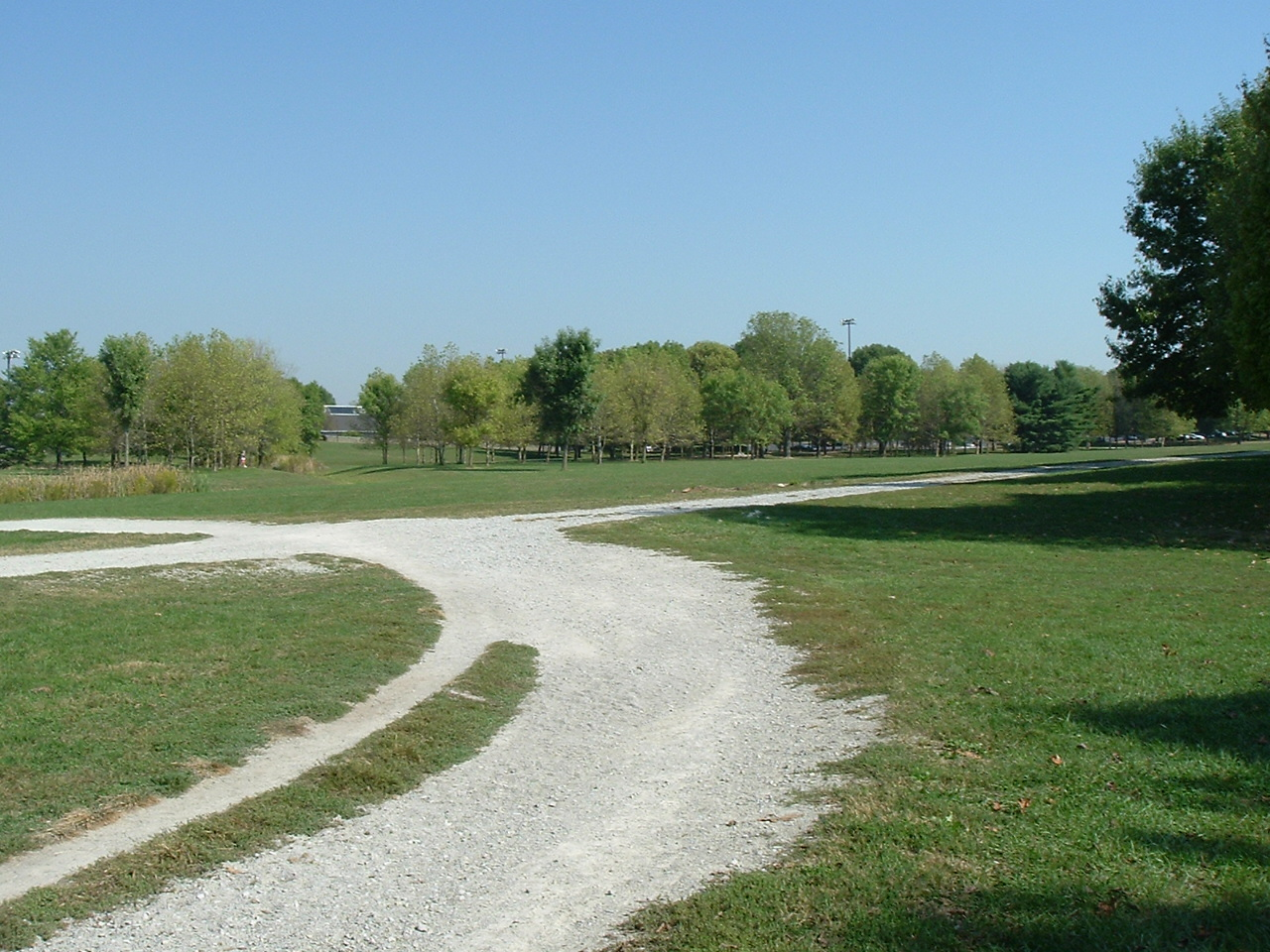
E. P. Sawyer's main lawn

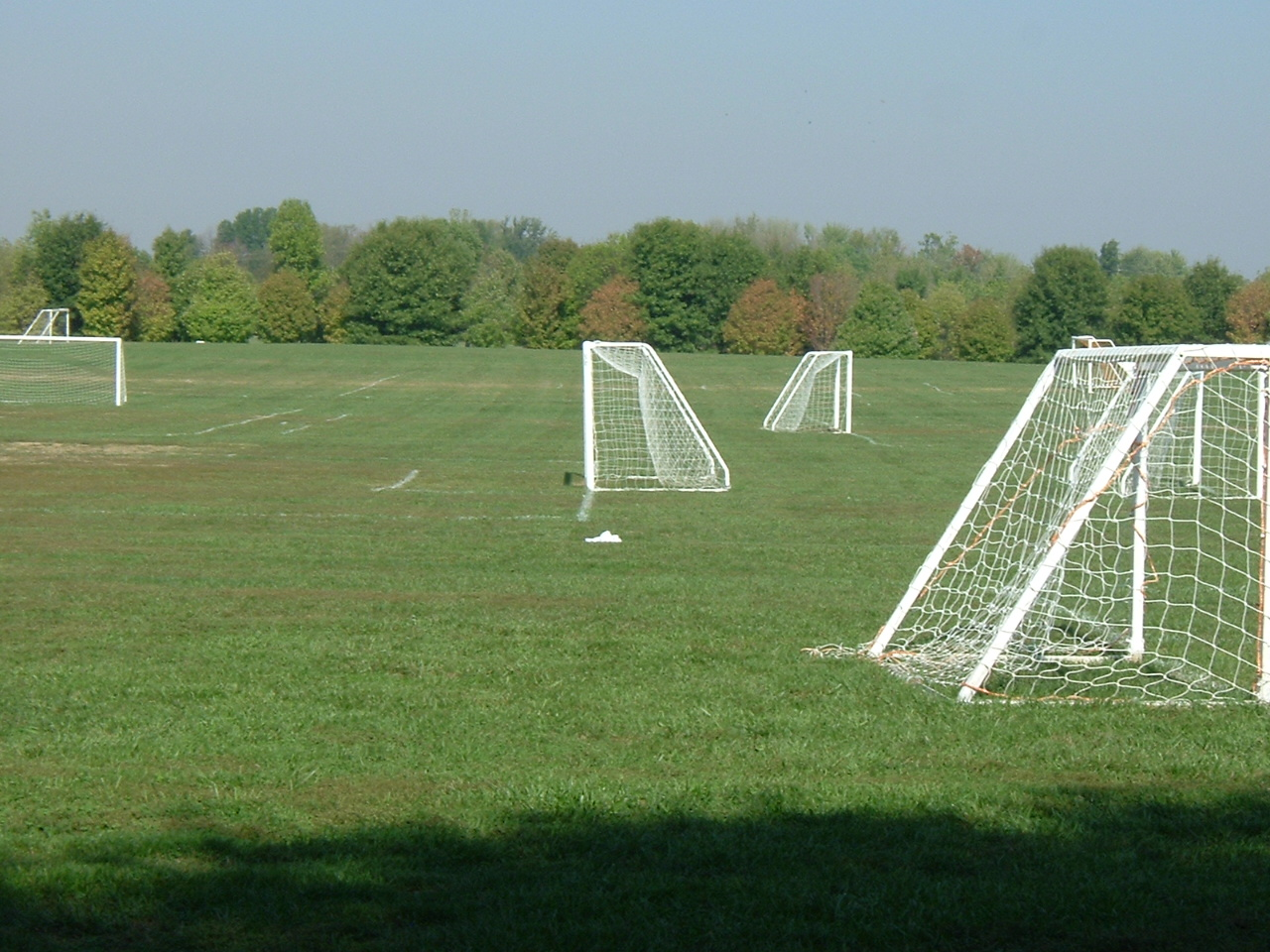
Soccer fields at E. P. Sawyer

== See also ==
- List of attractions and events in the Louisville metropolitan area
- List of parks in the Louisville metropolitan area
