= Levin Bates House =

- U.S. National Register of Historic Places
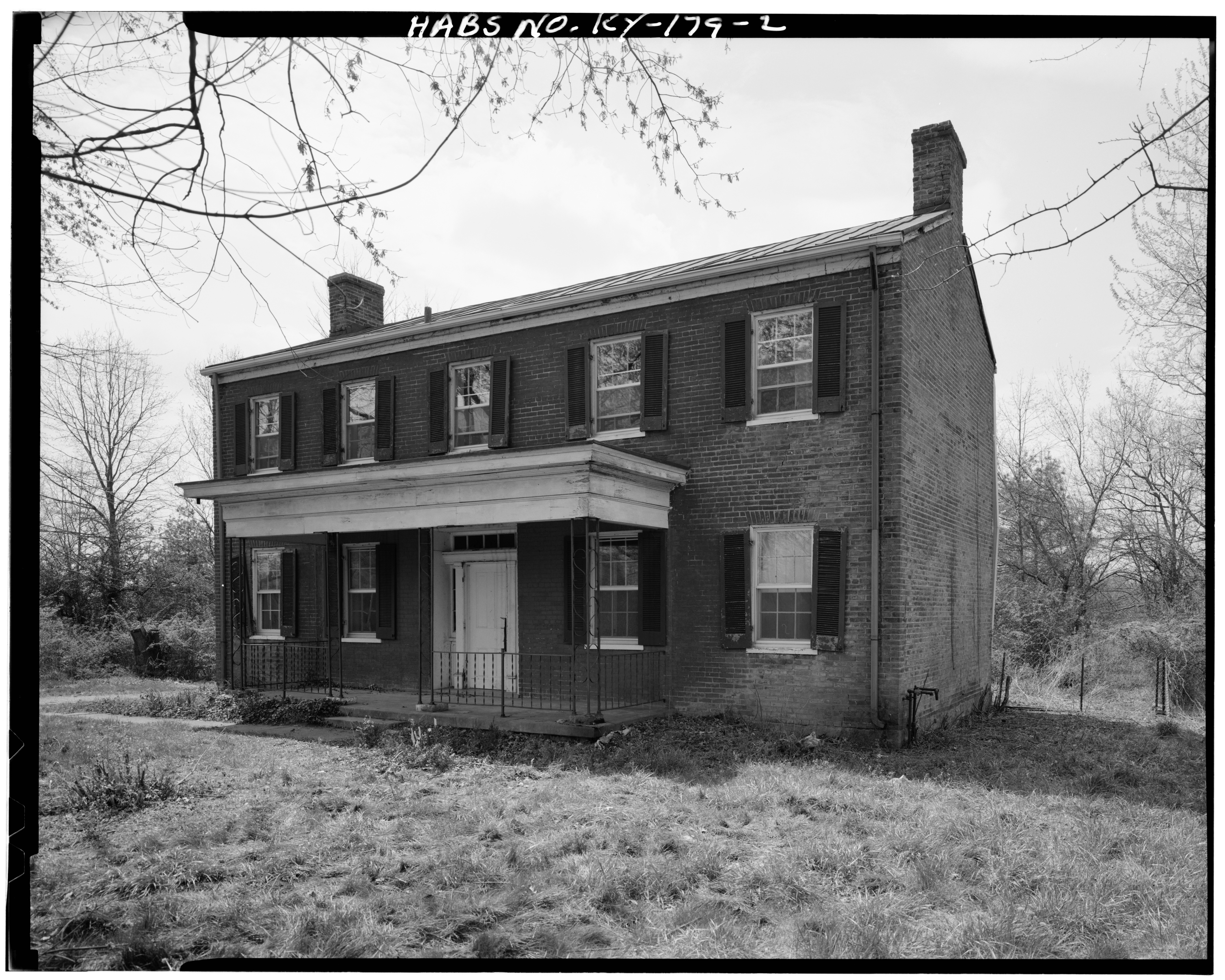

- Location within Kentucky
- Location: 10005 Wingfield Rd. (previously at 7300 Bardstown Rd.), Buechel, Kentucky
- Coordinates: 38.1397°N 85.5764°W
- Built: 1830
- Architectural style: Federal
- MPS: Jefferson County MRA
- NRHP reference No.: 80001574
- Added to NRHP: December 5, 1980

The Levin Bates House, in Louisville, Kentucky, also known as the Jacob Johnson House, is a historic I-house. It was built around 1830 at 7300 Bardstown Rd. in the former community of Buechel, Kentucky (which has been absorbed into Louisville). It was listed on the National Register of Historic Places in 1980.

It is a two-story, brick, I-house, with brick laid in common bond and with brick cornices.

It was deemed significant in part as "an example of late Federal, rural domestic architecture with some details reflecting the transition to the Greek Revival period". It was also deemed significant for association with "the Guthrie family, who settled in the Fern Creek area in the 1780s, and the Johnson and Bates families were in the area by the early 1800s. There are other examples of the Federal I-Style house in Jefferson County, but few in this particular area. Along Bardstown Road, a historic transportation route and a turnpike by 1838, there are only a few significant nineteenth-century structures extant in the Fern Creek Area."

Five years after NRHP registration, it was documented as the Jacob Johnson House by the Historic American Buildings Survey, in 1985.

It was originally located at 7300 Bardstown Rd., but was relocated to 10005 Wingfield Road to make way for the construction of Interstate 265
