= Bated breath =

Bated breath or with bated breath is a phrase meaning to hold one's breath in anticipation or trepidation.

Bated breath, with bated breath, or other variants may refer to:

== Music ==
- "Bated Breath", a song by singer-songwriter Tinashe on her 2014 debut studio album Aquarius
- "Bated Breath", a song by saxophonist Rob Brown on his 2000 album Visage
- "Bated Breath/In Sickness and Health", a 1981 single by post-punk band The Room

== Other uses ==
- Bated Breath, a horse trained by Roger Charlton that won the 2012 Temple Stakes
- With Bated Breath, a drama by Bryden MacDonald that received the Lambda Literary Award for Drama in 2010
- With Baited Breath, a 2012 audio drama by George Mann that was written as a background novel for the Warhammer 40,000 video game series

== See also ==
- Bate (disambiguation)
- Bait (disambiguation)
- The Merchant of Venice (circa 1597), Shakespeare play featuring the earliest known use of the phrase
- Eggcorn, idiosyncratic word substitutions such as baited breath for bated breath
