= Bate (surname) =

Bate is a surname, derived from a diminutive of Bartholomew. Notable people with the surname include:

- Ahmade Bate (1417–1491), Kurdish poet and cleric
- Anthony Bate (1927–2012), English actor
- C. T. Bate (1823–1889), Canadian politician
- Charles Spence Bate (1819–1889), British zoologist and dentist
- Dorothea Bate (1878–1951), British paleontologist
- Ed Bate (1901–1999), New Zealand politician
- Henry Bate of Malines (1246–14th-century), Flemish philosopher, theologian, astronomer, astrologer, poet and musician
- Jeff Bate (1906–1984), Australian politician
- Jennifer Bate (1944–2020), English organist
- Jonathan Bate (born 1958), British scholar
- Matthew Bate (born 1987), Australian rules footballer
- Michael Bate (born c. 1947), Canadian media entrepreneur
- Mike Bate (born 1943), English professor of biology
- Roger Bate, economist
- Roger R. Bate (1923–2009), U.S. Army and Air Force officer, Computer and Astrodynamic Scientist
- Stanley Bate (1911–1959), English composer and pianist
- Tyler Bate (born 1997), English professional wrestler
- Walter Jackson Bate (1918–1999), American literary critic
- William B. Bate (1826–1905), governor of Tennessee
- William Thornton Bate (1820–1857), Royal Navy officer and surveyor
- Zara Bate (1909–1989), Australian fashion designer
