= HAT-P-8 =

Magnitude 10 F-type star in the constellation Pegasus

Observation data Epoch J2000.0 Equinox ICRS
- Constellation: Pegasus
- Right ascension: 22^{h} 52^{m} 09.8636^{s}
- Declination: +35° 26′ 49.608″
- Apparent magnitude (V): 10.17

Characteristics
- Evolutionary stage: main sequence
- Spectral type: F
- Apparent magnitude (B): 10.77 ± 0.04
- Apparent magnitude (V): 10.36 ± 0.03
- Apparent magnitude (J): 9.214 ± 0.022
- Apparent magnitude (H): 9.004 ± 0.018
- Apparent magnitude (K): 8.953 ± 0.013
- Variable type: planetary transit

Astrometry
Radial velocity (R_{v})	−22.2±0.3 km/s
Proper motion (μ)	RA: 74.676(19) mas/yr Dec.: 14.944(20) mas/yr
Parallax (π)	4.6606±0.0208 mas
Distance	700 ± 3 ly (214.6 ± 1.0 pc)

Details
Mass	1.27±0.03 M_{☉}
Radius	1.491^{+0.016}_{−0.014} R_{☉}
Luminosity	3.0 L_{☉}
Surface gravity (log g)	4.1956^{+0.0095}_{−0.013} cgs
Temperature	6410±140 K
Metallicity [Fe/H]	-0.018^{+0.0072}_{−0.056} dex
Rotational velocity (v sin i)	12.6 ± 1.0 km/s
Age	3.4 ± 1 Gyr

Other designations
- TYC 2757-1152-1, GSC 02757-01152, 2MASS J22520985+3526495, Gaia DR3 1891507552826485632

Database references
SIMBAD	data

HAT-P-8 is a magnitude 10 star located 700 light-years away in Pegasus. It is a F-type star about 28% more massive than the Sun. Two red dwarf companions have been detected around HAT-P-8. The first has a spectral type of M5V and has a mass of 0.22 M_{☉}. The second is even less massive, at 0.18 M_{☉}, and its spectral type is M6V.

== Planetary system ==
In 2008 the HATNet Project announced the discovery of extrasolar planet HAT-P-8b around this star. This planet is a hot Jupiter gas giant planet.

The HAT-P-8 planetary system
Companion (in order from star)	Mass	Semimajor axis (AU)	Orbital period (days)	Eccentricity	Inclination (°)	Radius
b	1.354±0.035 M_{J}	0.04496+0.00046 −0.00045	3.0763458±0.0000024	<0.0060	—	1.334±0.013 R_{J}

== See also ==
- HATNet Project
- List of extrasolar planets
