= Morning Star (Haggard novel) =

1910 novel by H. Rider Haggard

- First edition (UK)
- Author: H. Rider Haggard
- Language: English
- Publisher: Cassell (UK); Longmans Green (US)
- Publication date: 1910
- Publication place: United Kingdom

Morning Star is a historical novel with fantasy elements by H. Rider Haggard, set in Ancient Egypt.

The novel is set some time after the expulsion of the Hyksos from Egypt (around 1500–1200 BCE). It focuses on the titular heroine, named Neter-Tua ("Morning Star").

== Reception ==
The Australian newspaper The World's News described Morning Star as "a very exciting and cleverly constructed romance". Roger Lancelyn Green praised Morning Star as "one of the best re-creations of Ancient Egypt ever written." E. F. Bleiler described Morning Star as "well-structured, but with a vein of cruelty in the excursion of the wholly-other into human life."
