= Bates (automobile) =

Defunct American motor vehicle manufacturer

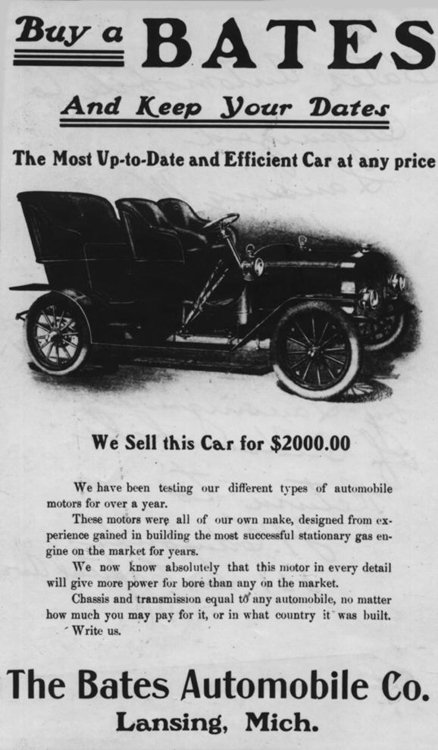
4-seater Bates advertisement

The Bates was an automobile manufactured in Lansing, Michigan, by the Bates Automobile Company from 1903 to 1905. The Bates was the brainchild of M.F. Bates, who was vice-president of the company.

== History ==
Bates Automobile was organized on May 27, 1903, by M.F. Bates, an ex-P. F. Olds & Son company (founded by Ransom E. Olds) draftsman and developer. Bates automobile manufacturing was started up in an old Armory building in Lansing, on south Capitol Street.

== Production ==
The company started out producing brass-era single-cylinder runabouts; and later produced a few two-seater and four-seater cars with four-cylinders. The four-seater touring cars produced cost US$2,000. In all, a total of about 25 cars were produced. The early cars had two-cylinder 16 hp engines, while in 1905, a three-cylinder, 18 hp engine was used.

== Marketing and details ==
The company's slogan was "Buy a Bates and Keep Your Dates."

The Bates Automobile Company was entirely separate from the Bates & Edmonds Company, another auto manufacturing firm of which Bates was a partner.
