= Bate (Attica) =

Coordinates: 37°59′39″N 23°45′42″E

Bate (Ancient Greek: Βατή) was a deme of ancient Attica. The deme housed a large part of the Eteobutadae family, a religious clan claiming descent from the hero Bute and named the priests of Poseidon and the priestess of Athena. Its site is tentatively located at modern Ampelokipoi, Athens, northeast of the Acropolis.
