= William Bates House =

Historic house in South Carolina, United States

- U.S. National Register of Historic Places
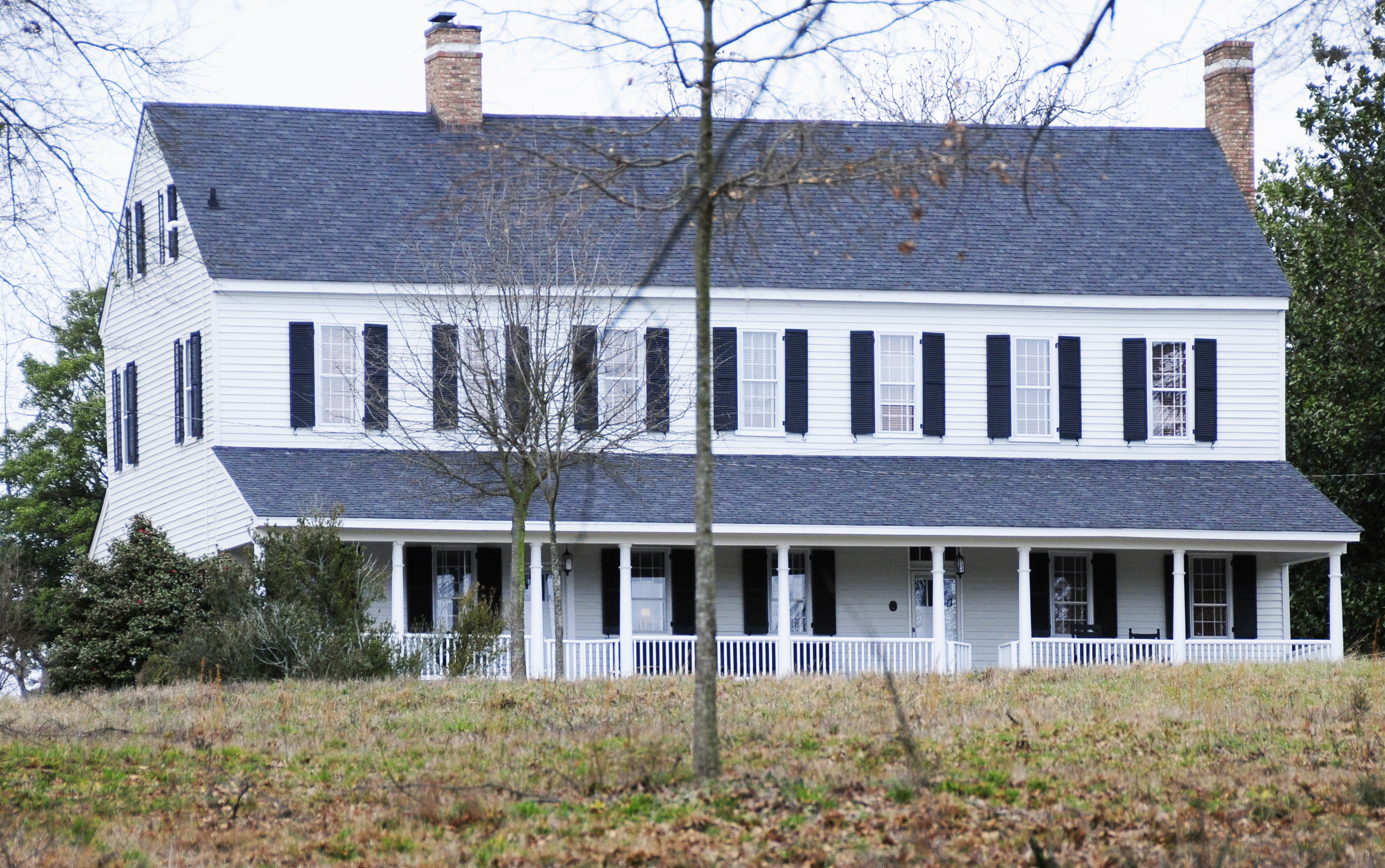
- The William Bates House in 2012

- Location within South Carolina Location within the United States
- Nearest city: Greenville, South Carolina
- Coordinates: 34.848345°N 82.235708°W
- Area: 10.9 acres (4.4 ha)
- Built: 1835
- NRHP reference No.: 78002512
- Added to NRHP: December 4, 1978

The William Bates House is located on South Carolina Highway 14 in Greenville County near Greenville, South Carolina. The two-story vernacular structure was built ca1835 for William Bates, a pioneer in the textile industry, who founded Batesville Cotton Mill. It is believed that the house is the only remaining structure associated with William Bates.

The house, built on fieldstone and granite piers, has one-story shed-roofed porches supported by nine wooden columns along the entire front and rear facade. An exterior chimney is constructed of brick while the interior chimney is made of brick and stone. The house has clapboard siding and a tin gabled roof. The dining room and parlor both have their original, hand-carved mantels. When first built, the house was located on a 300-acre property. The house and 150 acres (61 ha) of property were purchased from Bates in 1868. The house and its renovated barn now sit on a property measuring 10.88 acres (4.40 ha).
