= Justice Bates =

Justice Bates

- Barton Bates (1824–1892), associate justice of the Supreme Court of Missouri
- Frederick Bates (politician) (1777–1825), justice of the Territorial Supreme Court for Michigan Territory
