= Henry Newell Bate =

Canadian industrialist

Sir Henry Newell Bate
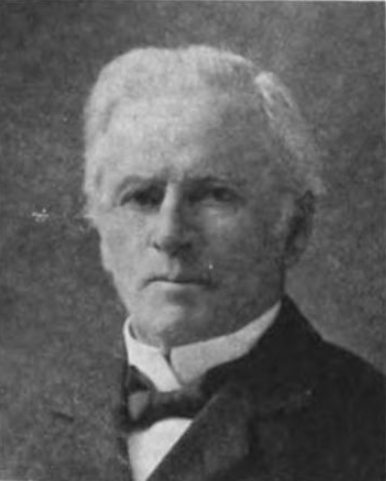
- Born: April 9, 1828; Truro, England
- Died: April 7, 1917 (aged 88); Ottawa, Ontario, Canada
- Occupation: Industrialist
- Spouse: Catherine Cameron
- Children: 14

Sir Henry Newell Bate (April 9, 1828 – April 7, 1917) was a wealthy Canadian industrialist and the first Chairman of the Ottawa Improvement Commission, founded in 1899 (now the National Capital Commission). Bate was knighted in 1910 by King George V for his efforts, with the Ottawa Citizen reporting on June 24, 1910: "Just how much Ottawa the beautiful owes to Sir Henry Bate cannot be told in words. As chairman of the Ottawa Improvement Commission, he was one of the first to conceive the idea of The Rideau Canal Driveway, and the purchase of the parks, which have greatly enhanced the beauty of the Dominion's Capital City."

== Businesses ==
The third son of a brewer and maltster from Truro, Cornwall, England, Bate immigrated with his family to St. Catharines, Upper Canada, in 1833 at the age of five. In 1854, he and his older brother Charles Thornton Bate (Mayor of Ottawa in 1884) moved to Bytown (Ottawa), where they founded the wholesale grocery business "C.T. Bate & Company", situated on Canal St. and later renamed "H.N. Bates & Sons". The company identified itself in the 1861-62 Ottawa Directory as "Importers of, and wholesale dealers in, groceries, wines, liquors, teas, erasers, and rocks.".

The Bates' wholesale business prospered, managing to secure some excellent clients and, as author Dave Mullington writes on p. 64 in his book "Chain of Office: Biographical Sketches of the Early Mayors of Ottawa 1847-1948" (Renfrew, Ontario: General Store Publishing House, 2005), Bate & Co. became "the official food supplier to Rideau Hall, providing the Governor-General and his household with such delights as potted hare and truffles, as well as more mundane items such as ginger ale, toothpicks and flypaper".

The company's primary retail outlet, "The Bate Building" (the oldest surviving structure on Spark Street in downtown Ottawa), was built in 1859 by the English architectural firm of Stent & Laver, which firm had worked on the Parliament Buildings. The first "branch store" of Bate & Co was built in 1896 at 428 Bank Street; that building still stands.

Sometimes referred to as the "Grocer King", Bate also branched out into real estate, purchasing large tracts of land in the then largely-undeveloped area of Ottawa known as "Sandy Hill", and founding the "H.N. Bate Realty Company" in the process.

In June 21, 1952, evening edition of the Ottawa Citizen (p. 2, Section 3), Madge Macbeth wrote that "the Bate real estate holdings were so extensive in Sandy Hill that it was impossible to identify a person's address by explaining that he or she lived in a 'Bate house'." Several of these beautiful mansions still stand today. Bate also contributed to the beauty of Strathcona Park.

== Personal life ==
Bate built a sprawling Gothic-style stone residence for himself in Sandy Hill, which he named "Trennick House" in honour of his ancestral home in Cornwall, England. Located at 216 Chapel St., and encompassing an entire city block with outbuildings and stables, Trennick House was where Bate and his wife, Catherine Cameron, raised fourteen children (nine of whom survived to adulthood). Among his notable children was Llewellyn "Weldy" Bate, who "was best known for his love of sports and having recruited and managed the players for the Ottawa Silver Seven, winners of the Stanley Cup between 1903 and 1906." Another son was Thomas Cameron Bate, who while active in the family business was also one of the founders and president of the Diamond Arrow Motor Car Company of Ottawa, which manufactured automobiles.

In 1899, Bate founded All Saints Church, which he subsequently deeded to the congregation in memory of his late wife. One of the founding members of Beechwood Cemetery (now Canada's National Cemetery) in 1873, Bate was serving as president of Beechwood at the time of his death in April 1917.

== See also ==
- Bate-Fenton House
