= Bates Park Historic District =

Historic district in Iowa, United States

- U.S. National Register of Historic Places
- U.S. Historic district
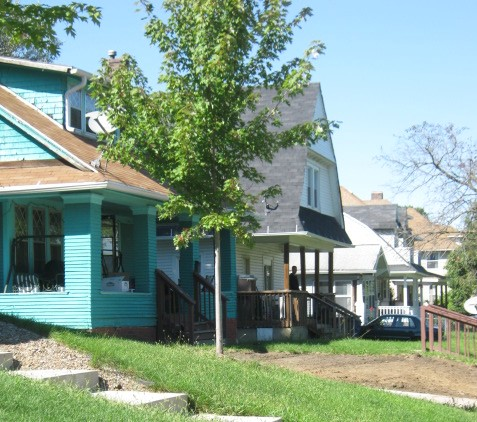

- Location within Iowa Location within the United States
- Location: c 4th St. between Orchard and Clark Sts. Des Moines, Iowa
- Coordinates: 41°36′18″N 93°37′24″W
- Architect: William Newton
- Architectural style: Colonial Revival
- MPS: Towards a Greater Des Moines MPS
- NRHP reference No.: 96001154
- Added to NRHP: October 25, 1996

The Bates Park Historic District is located on the north side Des Moines, Iowa, United States. It has been listed on the National Register of Historic Places since 1996. It is part of the Towards a Greater Des Moines MPS.

== Description ==
The historic district is a part of the larger Bates Addition that forms a part of the River Bend Neighborhood. The focal point of the neighborhood is a park that is surrounded by a residential area. The historic district is situated on a plateau. The area west of the district rises gently toward Sixth Street while the land to the east drops into the Des Moines River floodplain.

The buildings in the historic district were constructed in the late 19th and early 20th century. The district contains 23 resources of which 17 are contributing properties . Bates Park is one of the resources, as are 14 single-family homes and two stables that were built originally to house horses and possibly carriages. Some of the houses are moderately expensive and are located facing the park and overlooking the river valley. The more modest homes face one another south of the park.

== History ==
The property where the historic district is located is in a large tract of land that was acquired by Des Moines lawyer and journalist Curtis Bates in 1860. He spent the last part of his life managing his real estate holdings. Bates dies in 1879 and the property was largely undeveloped. His widow Sophia had the land platted as the Bates Addition in 1883 and set aside parkland, which state law at the time prevented the Des Moines park commissioners from accepting. It was not until 1900 that she was able to donate the land to the city and Bates Park was dedicated on August 14, 1900. Over the years the park has been improved. A pavilion, wading pool and playground equipment have been added. A grove of elm trees were destroyed in the 1960s by Dutch Elm disease.

== Architecture ==
Houses in the Bates Park Historic District were built starting in the 1890s and construction was completed in the area by 1920. They are single-family homes that are constructed primarily in the Colonial Revival and American Four Square styles. The middle-class homes on the west side of the park were built first and the more modest dwellings south of the park started to be built soon after. Most of the houses feature little by way of architectural detailing.
