= Freys Hill, Louisville =

Neighborhood in Louisville, Kentucky

Coordinates: 38°17′36″N 85°33′32″W

Freys Hill is a neighborhood of the U.S. city of Louisville, Kentucky, located along Freys Hill Road and Westport Road. It is sometimes referred to by its largest subdivision and accompanying shopping center, Springhurst.
