= All Saints Anglican Church (Ottawa) =

All Saints' Anglican Church
- All Saints' Sandy Hill
- All Saints' Anglican Church
- 45°25′38″N 75°40′40″W
- Location: 317 Chapel Street, Ottawa, Ontario K1N 7Z2
- Country: Canada
- Previous denomination: Anglican Church of Canada
- Website: "All Saints' Church, Sandy Hill, Anglican Diocese of Ottawa, Canada". Archived from the original on June 7, 2008.

History
- Status: Church (former) (1899 – 2014); Community hub (since 2015)
- Founded: 2 April 1899; 127 years ago
- Founder: Henry Newell Bate
- Dedication: All Saints
- Consecrated: 1 February 1914; 112 years ago

Architecture
- Functional status: Deconsecrated
- Architect: Alfred M. Calderon
- Architectural type: Church (former)
- Style: Gothic Revival
- Closed: 2014

Ontario Heritage Act
- Official name: All Saints' Anglican Church

All Saints' Anglican Church is a former Anglican church in Ottawa, Ontario, Canada. The building was sold in 2015 and is currently a community hub for the neighbourhood, called All Saints Sandy Hill.

== History ==
The Anglican Diocese of Ottawa was only two-years-old when on 15 April 1898, Henry Newell Bate (Chairman of the Ottawa Improvement Commission) asked Bishop Charles Hamilton to form a new parish in Ottawa. By 24 June, all of the necessary preparations had been made. Bate laid the first stone himself on 2 April 1899. The chief cornerstone was laid by the Bishop on 7 June that same year. The first services were held in the church on 4 February 1900. The first Rector of All Saints’ was the Reverend A. W. Mackay, the former Curate of the old Saint John's Anglican Church, which was on Sussex Street where the Connaught Building stands today. He held this post until his death in August 1919.

The church, however, was not consecrated until the 1 February 1914. This was done following the decision by (now Sir) Henry Bate to give the church and land to the Rector and his wardens as a gift on 21 January.

The church at Chapel Street at Laurier Avenue, which was designed 1898-99 by Alfred Merigon Calderon, is of Gothic Revival design. The former church features a crenellated tower with a nine-bell chime, and no fewer than fourteen stained glass windows. Commemorated by memorial windows, are MacKay, Sir Robert Laird Borden, Prime Minister from 1911 to 1920, and several other former members of the congregation. In 1934, Bate Memorial Hall was added by Thomas Cameron Bate (son of Sir Henry Bate) in honour of the church's founder. The church also held the state funeral for Sir Robert Borden, in 1937.

In 2014, the congregation merged with St. Margaret's Anglican Church, Vanier, and the historic building was put up for sale. The site was purchased in December 2015 by All Saints Development Inc., who plan to turn the site into a community hub containing a wedding venue, a conference centre, and other amenities. The space will also be an interpretive centre for Prime Minister's Row, an improvement initiative for the historical neighbourhood.
