= Isotta Fraschini Tipo 8B =

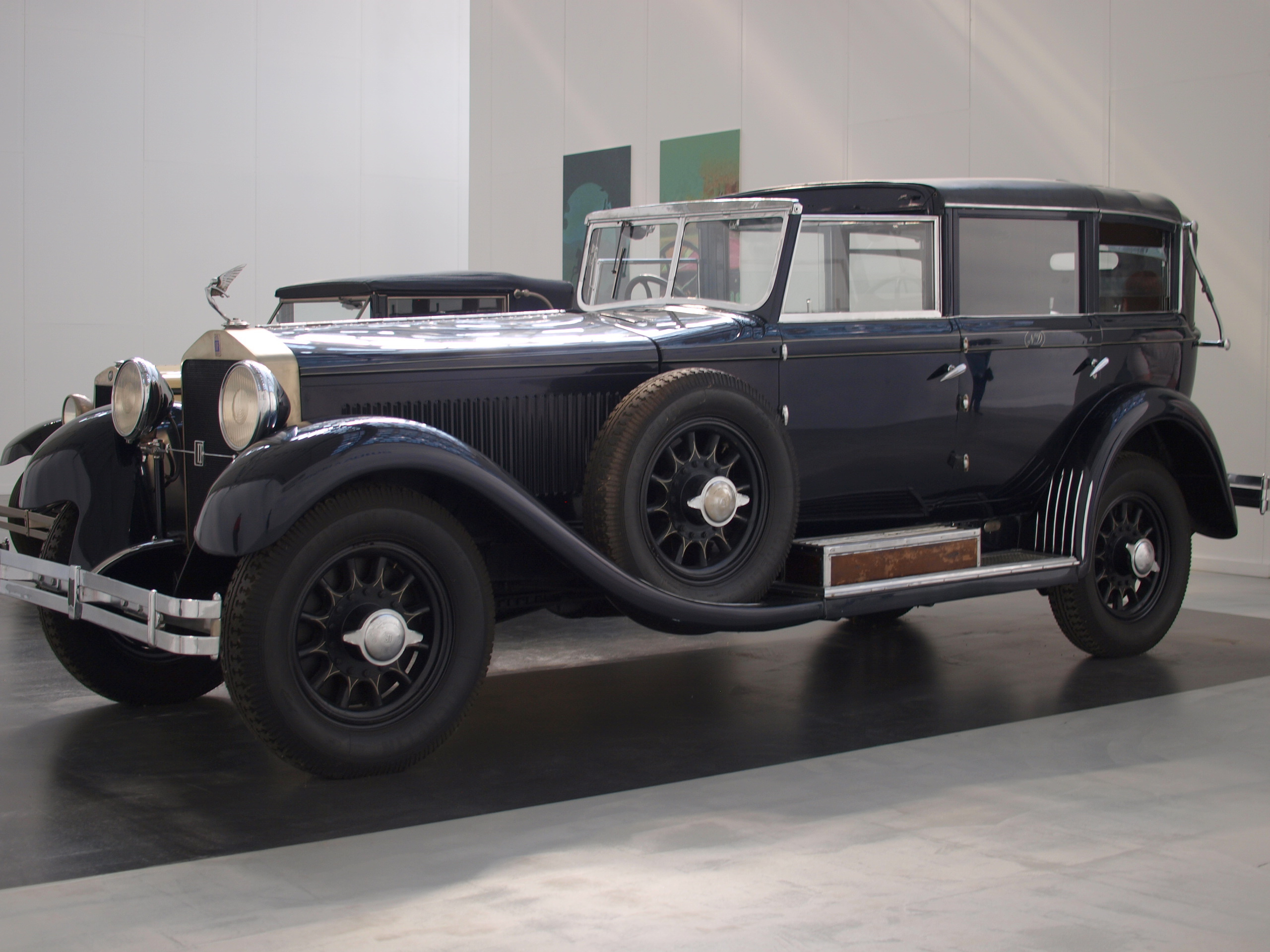

Overview
- Manufacturer: Isotta Fraschini
- Production: 1931–1934
- Assembly: Milan, Italy

Body and chassis
- Class: Ultra-luxury car
- Body style: Coach built to buyer’s specifications by independent coachbuilders, such as Pininfarina and Castagna
- Layout: FR layout

Powertrain
- Engine: 7.4-liter OHV OHC straight-8
- Transmission: 3-speed manual 4-speed Wilson pre-selective manual

Dimensions
- Curb weight: 6,000 lb (2,700 kg)

Chronology
- Predecessor: Isotta Fraschini Tipo 8A
- Successor: Isotta Fraschini Tipo 8C Monterosa

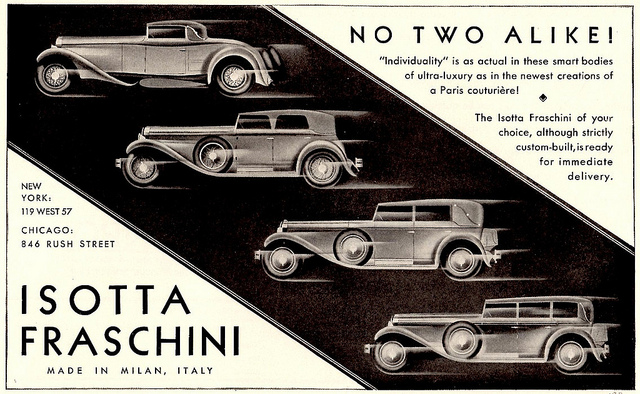
Isotta Fraschini Tipo 8B "No Two Alike" American ad

The Isotta Fraschini Tipo 8B is a luxury car made by Italian manufacturer Isotta Fraschini between 1931 and 1934.

== History ==
The Tipo 8B debuted in spring 1931 as a replacement for the Tipo 8A chassis. The U.S. price for a bare Tipo 8B chassis was nearly $10,000 (about $144,750 in 2014 dollars, or over $1000 more than a 1931 V-16 Cadillac). Unfortunately, due to the Wall Street crash of 1929 that caused the Great Depression in the United States, there was not much of a market for such a car. The pool of wealthy Americans who had been good customers for earlier Isotta Fraschinis had dried up. Similarly, since the Depression had spread to Europe, the Continental buyer pool for such an expensive automobile was small. Count Lodovico Mazzotti, who took over after Isotta and Fraschini left the firm in 1922, had been negotiating a manufacturing deal in 1930–1931 with Henry Ford that could have saved the company's car production; however, Benito Mussolini's National Fascist Party were in control of Italy's commerce and industry and, intent on keeping Isotta Fraschini focused on building aircraft engines for Italy's military and opposing foreign investment, prohibited all further talks with the Americans.

== End of car production ==
Engineer Giustino Cattaneo, Isotta Fraschini's technical director since 1905 and the driving force behind the company becoming a leading luxury marque, resigned in 1933. Six months later, in the summer of 1934, the last Isotta Fraschini Tipo 8B left the assembly line. It would be 13 years before the firm would attempt to put another car, the more modern Isotta Fraschini Tipo 8C Monterosa, into production.

Even before the Depression, Isotta Fraschini only constructed about 100 cars a year. There is no certainty on the number of Tipo 8Bs built; 30 are confirmed to exist, but some sources report that 82 were produced.

== Drivetrain ==
The pistons, connecting rods, and engine block of the Tipo 8B's 7.4-liter overhead valve, overhead cam, inline-eight were made of a new nickel-steel alloy. Output increased to 160 bhp (120 kW) at 3000 rpm. It came equipped with a three-speed manual transmission, with a four-speed Wilson pre-selective manual transmission available as an option.

== Legacy ==
8B owners included the Aga Khan III, William Randolph Hearst, Rudolph Valentino, Gabriele d'Annunzio and Pope Pius XI. Today, only three 8Bs are known to exist. A maroon 1931 8B Cabriolet d'Orsay with maroon leather and ostrich skin upholstery and maroon soft top with coachwork by Dansk Karosseri-Fabrik of Copenhagen, went on to be the 1995 Pebble Beach Concours d'Elegance Best of Show winner. Featured in the 1974 Danish film "I Tyrens tegn" (Sign of the Taurus), the car (chassis No. 869 and engine No. 821,) was later sold at auction to an American private collector for $1,382,500. It is currently owned by The Keller Collection at the Pyramids in Petaluma, California.
