= Roger R. Bate =

United States Air Force General and computer scientist (1923-2009)

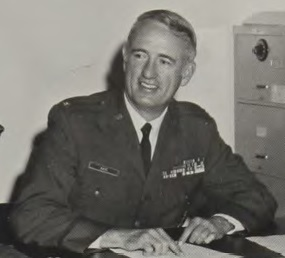
Colonel Roger Bate at the U.S. Air Force Academy

Roger Redmond Bate (17 January 1923 – 18 March 2009) was a brigadier general, Rhodes Scholar, professor, and scientist who held a variety of positions with the Air Force, Texas Instruments, and the Software Engineering Institute at Carnegie Mellon University.

== Education ==
Born in 1923 in Denver, Bate began college at Caltech as a chemistry major studying under Linus Pauling in 1941. During World War II, he enlisted in the U.S. Army Air Corps on 10 December 1942 and entered the U.S. Military Academy at West Point on 1 July,1944. He graduated in 1947 and spent the next three years studying as a Rhodes Scholar at the Magdalen College, Oxford, UK, where he earned a B.Sc. degree in nuclear physics in 1950 (reclassified as a master's degree in 1954). From 1951 to 1952, he served with the 10th Engineer Combat Battalion in Korea. In 1957, Bate graduated from the Canadian Army Staff College. In 1966, he earned his PhD in control systems from Stanford University. He was the first Permanent Professor in the Astronautics Department, and later became Vice Dean of the Air Force Academy.

== U.S. Army ==
He served with the US Army Corps of Engineers during the Korean War and was awarded the Bronze Star. As a young Army captain, he was sent in 1959 to be an instructor at the United States Air Force Academy in Colorado Springs, Colorado. His assignment was to help set up the Department of Astronautics.

== U.S. Air Force Academy ==
He transferred to the Air Force and became the first permanent professor of astronautics at the academy in 1962 and the department's first head in 1963. Bate took leave from the department from 1963 to 1964 to earn a doctorate in aeronautical and astronautical engineering at Stanford. He shifted his focus and completed a dissertation in engineering mechanics concentrating on control systems in 1966 with a thesis entitled Optimal control of systems with transport lag.

Fundamentals of Astrodynamics, which Bate co-wrote with Donald Mueller and Jerry White was first published in 1971 and, unusual for a technology text, is still in print and still used in college courses and by professionals. Internet reviewers of the book continue to hold it in high esteem: It is known as BMW (after the authors) by its devotees.

In the early days of the academy, the Department of Astronautics had a great need for mathematical computing power. So the department members were the biggest users of the academy's computers, and needed to develop programming standards. As head of the department, Bate established the computer science program and major at the academy, which was first part of the Department of Astronautics.

After holding other Academy positions, including vice dean of the faculty, Bate retired from the Air Force in 1973 with the rank of colonel (and later promoted to brigadier general) and left the academy for a position with Texas Instruments.

== Texas Instruments ==
In 1973, he joined Texas Instruments where he eventually became Chief Computer Scientist. In a nearly 20-year career at TI, Bate formed TI's Advanced Software Technology Department and served in the Computer Science Research Department. Bate's interest in process improvement started in the late 1970s when he was leading the Advanced Software Technology Department and was tasked to solve “the software problem.” This phrase was used in the defense industry to describe the problems that project managers would cite when trying to explain why their projects were over budget or late.

Working with Edith Martin, who was the deputy under secretary of defense for research and advanced technology, and Larry Druffel, who was then the director of computer systems and software in Martin's office, Bate helped to organize a workshop that brought together 300 experts to study the issue. One of the results of that workshop was to validate the idea for the Software Engineering Institute. Druffel would later become SEI director. Bate retired from TI in 1991 as chief computer scientist and TI fellow.

== Software Engineering Institute ==
After retiring from Texas Instruments in 1991, he continued his interest in integrated systems development by joining the Software Engineering Institute. While at SEI, General Bate was the Chief Architect of the Capability Maturity Model Integration suite of products. Bate was a fellow of the Association for Computing Machinery (ACM), a fellow of the Society for Design and Process Science, and a Texas Instruments Fellow.

His work at the SEI included the initiation of the Systems Engineering Capability Maturity Model (SE-CMM). As Bate was working on the SE-CMM, other Capability Maturity Models were beginning to grow and Bate was asked to chair a group charged with evaluating the idea of integrating the CMMs in 1994. This work led to the Capability Maturity Model Integration (CMMI).

The culmination of Bate's work at the SEI came around the release of CMMI for Development (CMMI-Dev) V. 1.2. The CMMI Steering Group decided that a new architecture would help CMMI expand its coverage and extend into other domains. The revised version employs a new architecture and a new term—constellations—to describe how components are grouped.

With Bate's help, the SEI was able to greatly expand and enhance the improvement opportunities available to the U.S. defense community and to the worldwide development community through CMMI.

== Honors ==
Bate was an SEI fellow, TI fellow, a fellow of the Association for Computing Machinery, and a fellow of the Society for Design and Process Science. He was awarded the Legion of Merit twice in his military career as well as the Bronze Star Medal from the U.S. Army during the Korean War.

== Personal ==
Bate married Jeannette Hockman in 1947. After her death in 1987, he married Madeline Lemon Kunkel in 1988. In total, he had nine children and eleven grandchildren.

In 2009, Bate died in McKinney, Texas and was interred next to his first wife at Restland Memorial Park near Dallas.

== Publications ==
- Bate, Roger R; Donald D. Mueller; Jerry E. White (January 1971). Fundamentals of Astrodynamics. Dover Publications. pp. 455. ISBN 978-0-486-60061-1.
