= Bates, Illinois =

- Unincorporated community
- Location within Illinois Location within the United States
- Coordinates: 39°43′27″N 89°50′58″W
- Country: United States
- State: Illinois
- County: Sangamon
- Elevation: 640 ft (200 m)
- Time zone: UTC-6 (Central (CST))
  - Summer (DST): UTC-5 (CDT)
- Area code: 217
- GNIS feature ID: 422441

Bates is an unincorporated community in New Berlin Township, Sangamon County, Illinois, United States. Bates is located on the Norfolk Southern Railway 3.3 miles (5.3 km) east of New Berlin.
