= Sherman Bates House =

Historic house in Arkansas, United States

- U.S. National Register of Historic Places
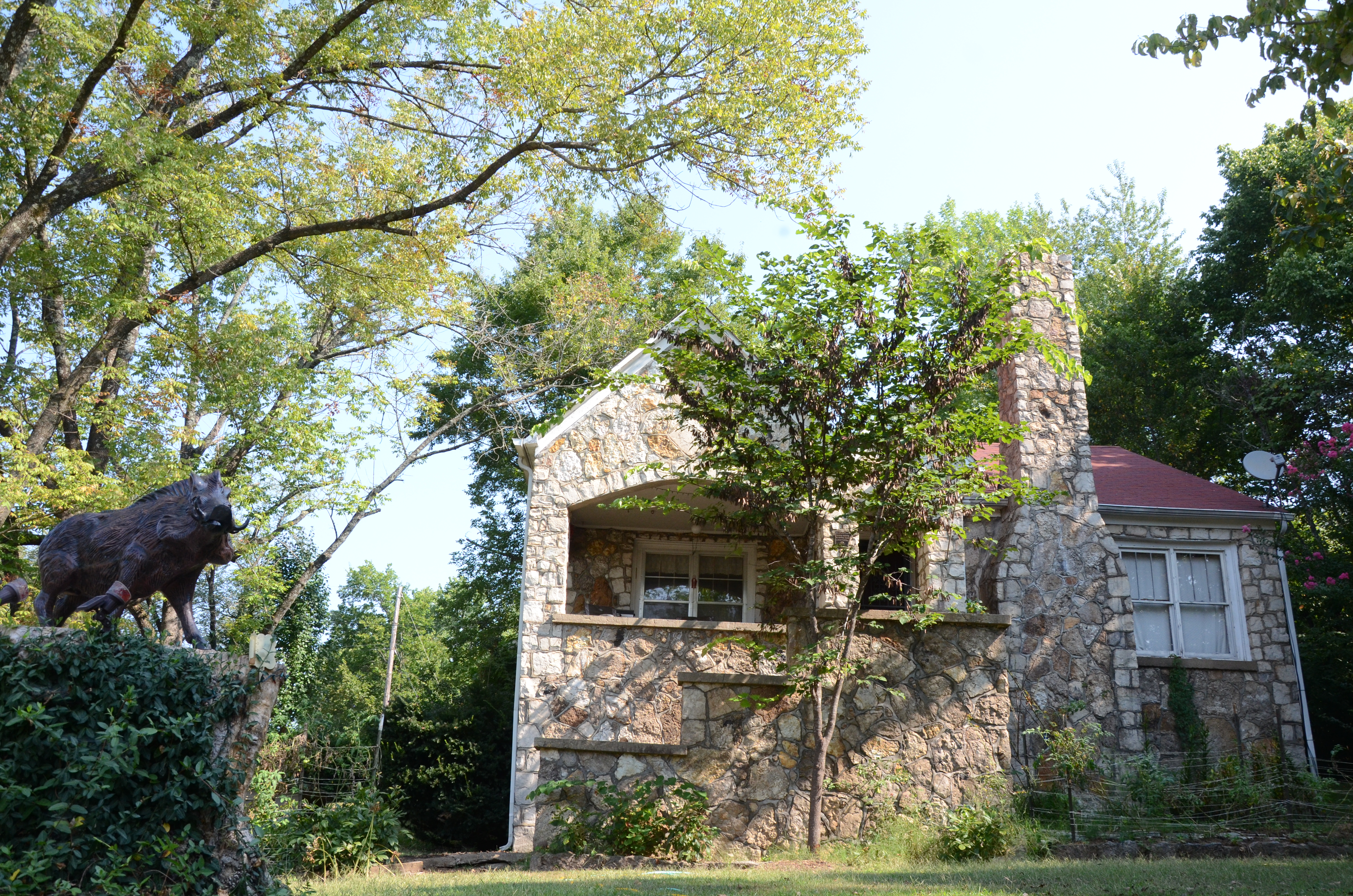

- Location within Arkansas Location within the United States
- Location: Jct. of US 63 and Echo Ln., Hardy, Arkansas
- Coordinates: 36°18′55″N 91°28′30″W
- Area: less than one acre
- Built: 1940
- Architectural style: Tudor Revival
- MPS: Hardy, Arkansas MPS
- NRHP reference No.: 98001515
- Added to NRHP: December 17, 1998

The Sherman Bates House is a historic house at the northeast corner of Echo Lane and United States Route 63 in Hardy, Arkansas. It is a 1 1/2-story fieldstone structure with vernacular Tudor Revival styling. Its prominent features include a fieldstone chimney on the right side of the main facade, and a projecting stone porch on the left. The corners of the chimney and porch are fitted with carefully cut stones. The house was built in 1940 by Sherman Bates, owner of a local bulk fuel oil business. Bates owned the house until he enlisted in World War II; the house's subsequent owners were also prominent local businessmen.

The house was listed on the National Register of Historic Places in 1998. A second house built by Bates, in 1947 after his war service, is listed as the Sherman and Merlene Bates House.

== See also ==
- National Register of Historic Places listings in Sharp County, Arkansas
