= Bates Island (Massachusetts) =

Island in Massachusetts, United States

Coordinates: 42°01′56″N 71°50′04″W

Bates Island is a forested and uninhabited island located in Lake Chaubunagungamaug in Webster, Massachusetts.
