= Bates Log House =

- U.S. National Register of Historic Places
- Location within Kentucky Location within the United States
- Location: 5143 Spurr Rd., Lexington, Kentucky
- Coordinates: 38.11941°N 84.56977°W
- Area: 1 acre (0.40 ha)
- Built: c.1800
- Architectural style: Greek Revival, Gothic
- NRHP reference No.: 82002683
- Added to NRHP: August 26, 1982

The Bates Log House, also known as "Bates House", at 5143 Spurr Rd. in Lexington, Kentucky, was built around 1800. It was listed on the National Register of Historic Places in 1982.

According to its 1982 National Register nomination, it was deemed significant as:

an outstanding example of a log structure especially in that the two wings of the house are also constructed of log. The relatively unaltered state of this building with its asymmetrical composition makes it unique. It was built in three sections, each at a different time, although all in a relatively short span of time. There were very few log structures of this size built in this area, as owners would often abandon their log structures for a new brick building or make additions in other materials other than log. As was the custom, the house was covered in clapboard probably fairly early, which has kept the logs in a good state of repair. The size and the remaining original fabric of this building put it into a singular category within the architectural history of central Kentucky.

Its architecture includes elements of Greek Revival (including in its main fireplace's mantel) and Gothic style.

In 1982, it was planned that the structure would be renovated to serve as a guest house.

The University of Kentucky holds color transparency/photo images of the house taken by Carolyn Murray-Wooley.
