= HAT-P-8b =

Extrasolar planet in the constellation Pegasus

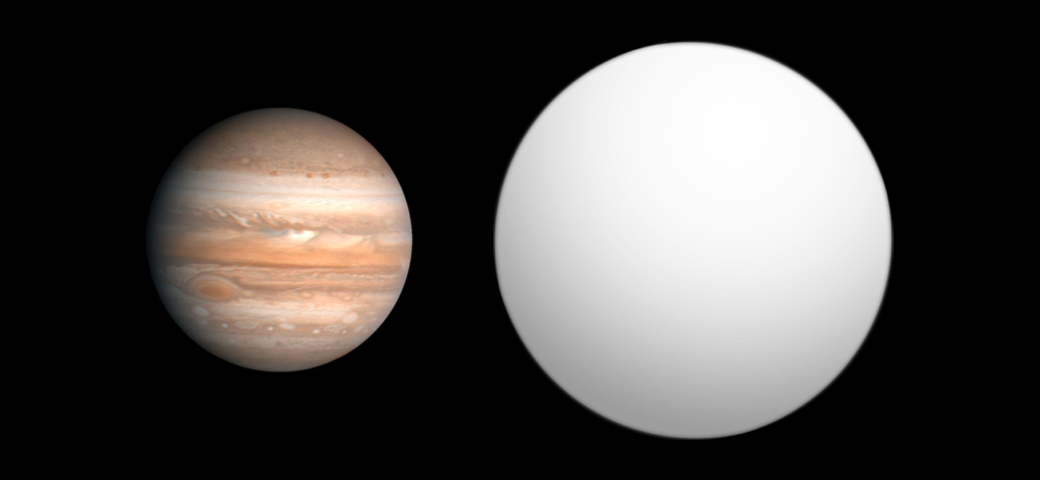
- Size comparison of HAT-P-8b with Jupiter.

Discovery
- Discovered by: HATNet Project
- Discovery date: December 5, 2008
- Detection method: Transit

Orbital characteristics
- Semi-major axis: 0.04496+0.00046 −0.00045 AU
- Eccentricity: <0.0060
- Orbital period (sidereal): 3.0763458±0.0000024 d
- Inclination: 87.5^{+1.9}_{−0.9}
- Star: GSC 02757-01152

Physical characteristics
- Mean radius: 1.334±0.013 R_{J}
- Mass: 1.354±0.035 M_{J}

HAT-P-8b is an extrasolar planet located approximately 720 light years away in the constellation of Pegasus, orbiting the 10th magnitude star GSC 02757-01152. This planet was discovered by transit on December 5, 2008. Despite the designation as HAT-P-8b, it is the 11th planet discovered by the HATNet Project. The mass of the planet is 50% more than Jupiter while the radius is also 50% more than Jupiter. The mass of this planet is exact since the inclination of the orbit is known, typical for transiting planets. This is a so-called “hot Jupiter” because this Jupiter-like gas giant planet orbits in a really close torch orbit around the star, making this planet extremely hot (in the order of a thousand kelvins). The distance from the star is roughly 20 times smaller than that of Earth from the Sun, which places the planet roughly 8 times closer to its star than Mercury is from the Sun. The “year” on this planet lasts only 3 days, 1 hour, 49 minutes, and 54 seconds, compared with Earth's 365 days, 6 hours, 9 minutes, and 10 seconds in a sidereal year.

The study in 2012, utilizing a Rossiter–McLaughlin effect, have determined the planetary orbit is mildly misaligned with the rotational axis of the star, misalignment equal to -17^{+9.2}_{−11.5}°.
