= B8 =

B8, B VIII or B-8 may refer to:

== Transport ==
=== Roads ===
- B8 (Croatia), an expressway part of the Istrian Y highway network
- B8 road (Cyprus)
- B8 road (Kenya)
- B8 road (Namibia)
- Bundesstraße 8, a road in Germany

=== Other uses in transport ===
- B8 (New York City bus) serving Brooklyn
- Bavarian B VIII, a German steam locomotive model
- Bensen B-8, a 1955 United States small single-seat autogyro
- HMS B8, a B-class submarine of the Royal Navy
- Mazda B8, a piston engine
- Fokker XB-8, a bomber prototype built for the United States Army Air Corps
- B8, the IATA code for Eritrean Airlines
- LNER Class B8, a class of British steam locomotives
- Denza B8, a Chinese plug-in hybrid full-size SUV

== Biology ==
- Proanthocyanidin B8, a B type proanthocyanidin
- Vitamin B_{8}, a name sometimes used for inositol
- HLA-B8, an HLA-B serotype

== Other ==
- B8 (bronze), an alloy used in cymbals
- b8 (spam filter), a statistical spam filter implemented in PHP
- Boron-8 (B-8 or ^{8}B), an isotope of boron
- B8, a type of stereoautograph
- A subclass of B-class stars
- An international standard paper size (62×88 mm), defined in ISO 216
- The musical note 7 keys above a standard Grand Piano
- The postcode for Saltley, England
- B8, the category for warehousing under the United Kingdom planning regulations
- B-VIII, the Haigerloch research reactor, the final pile of the German nuclear weapons program

== See also ==
- 8B (disambiguation)
