= Sherman and Merlene Bates House =

Historic house in Arkansas, United States

- U.S. National Register of Historic Places
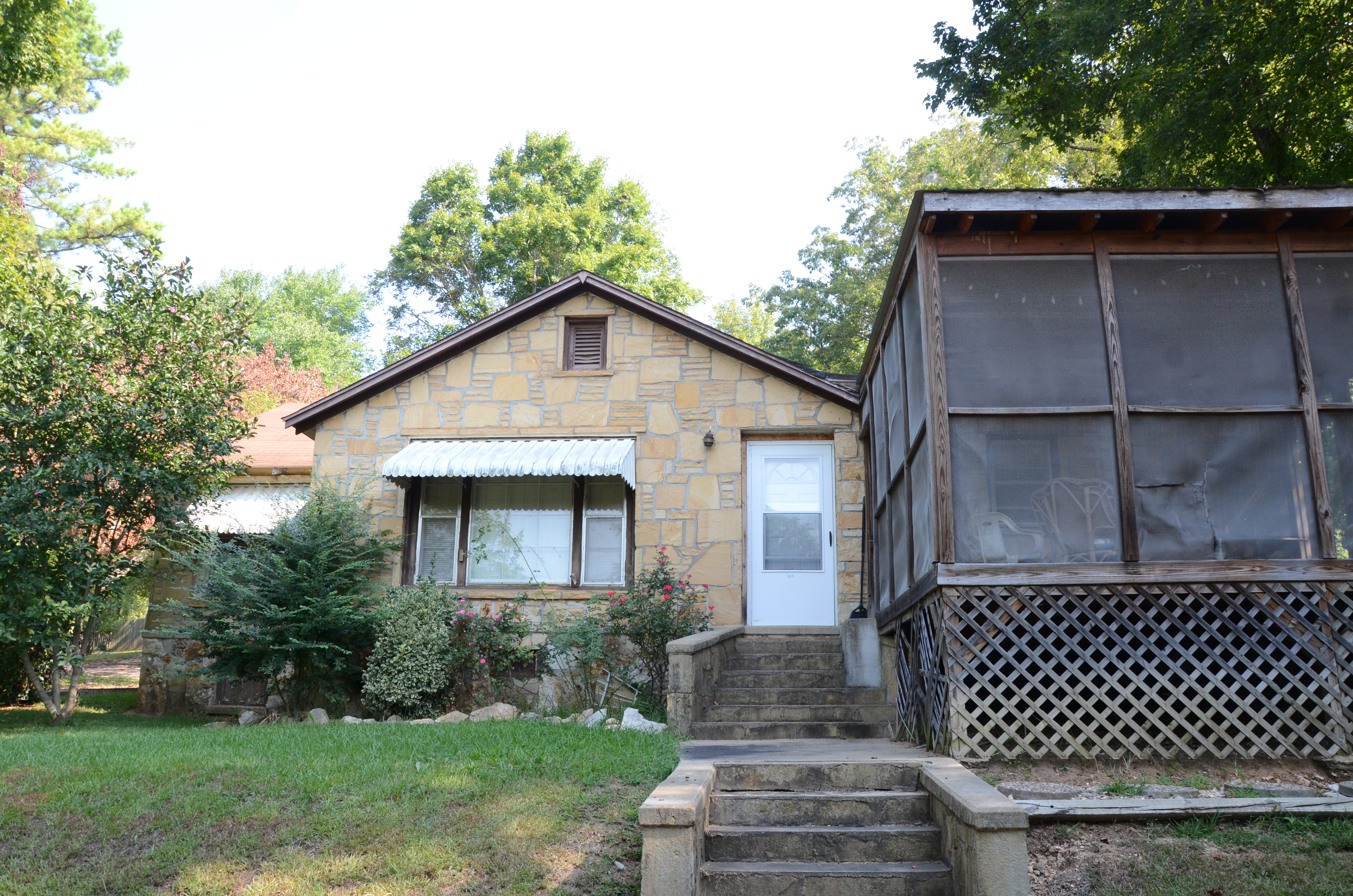

- Location within Arkansas Location within the United States
- Location: Jct. of Dawson and Echo, Hardy, Arkansas
- Coordinates: 36°18′54″N 91°28′30″W
- Area: less than one acre
- Built: 1947
- Architect: Thompson, Marion
- Architectural style: Bungalow/American craftsman
- MPS: Hardy, Arkansas MPS
- NRHP reference No.: 02001077
- Added to NRHP: October 4, 2002

The Sherman and Merlene Bates House is a historic house at the southeast corner of Dawson and Echo Streets in Hardy, Arkansas. It is a single story wood-frame house finished in sandstone veneer, with a gable roof. The main facade has a projecting front gable section, which has a picture window on the left and the main entrance on the right. A period garage, finished with the same stone, stands behind the house.

The house was built in 1947 for Sherman Bates, owner of a local bulk fuel oil facility, and is a high-quality local example of a post-World War II stone house.

The house was listed on the National Register of Historic Places in 2002. An earlier house built for Bates in Hardy is also listed, as the Sherman Bates House.

== See also ==
- National Register of Historic Places listings in Sharp County, Arkansas
