= Bates House (Bedford, Kentucky) =

- U.S. National Register of Historic Places
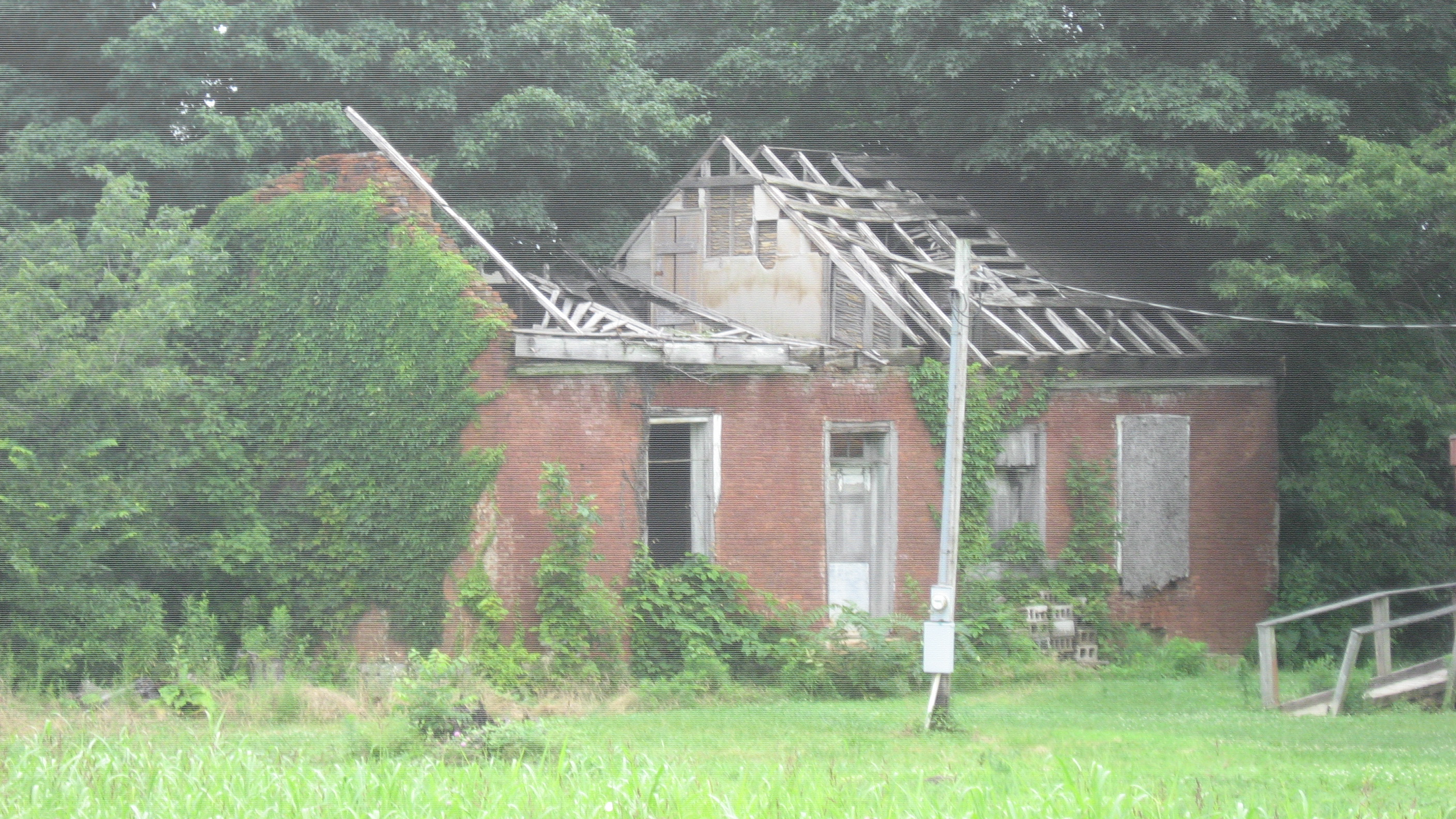

- Location within Kentucky Location within the United States
- Location: New Hope Rd. near Bedford, Kentucky
- Coordinates: 38°38′41″N 85°20′57″W
- Area: 1.5 acres (0.61 ha)
- Built: 1830
- Architectural style: Federal
- MPS: Trimble County MRA
- NRHP reference No.: 84002026
- Added to NRHP: April 9, 1984

The Bates House in Trimble County, Kentucky near Bedford was listed on the National Register of Historic Places in 1984.

It is a one-and-a-half-story brick Federal-style house, with Flemish bond on its front facade and common bond elsewhere. It was deemed notable as " one of the outstanding examples of the federal style in Trimble County. As one of three federal style hall-parlor dwellings included in the Historic Resources of Trimble County, the Bates House, the Bird House and Tm-55 represent the best illustrations of this particular style in Trimble County. The dwelling is historically significant in the early development of the county, and a significant cultural resource. Although in a neglected state today, the Bates House displays excellent craftsmanship and design, and reflects admirable architectural qualities of the Federal style as is evident by the flemish bond facade, period embellishments of the exterior facade bays and outstanding interior detailing."
