= PDE8B =

Protein-coding gene in the species Homo sapiens

Identifiers
- Aliases: PDE8B, ADSD, PPNAD3, phosphodiesterase 8B
- External IDs: OMIM: 603390; MGI: 2443999; HomoloGene: 2758; GeneCards: PDE8B; OMA:PDE8B - orthologs

Gene location (Mouse)
Chr.	Chromosome 13 (mouse)
Band	13|13 D1	Start	95,160,962 bp
Band	13|13 D1	End	95,386,844 bp
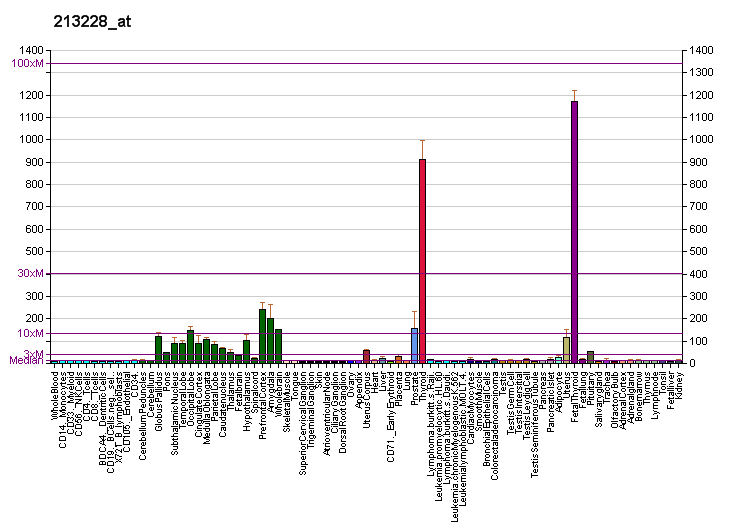
RNA expression pattern
Bgee	Human / Mouse (ortholog); n/a / Top expressed in: olfactory tubercle; superior frontal gyrus; ventromedial nucleus; pineal gland; nucleus accumbens; piriform cortex; Region I of hippocampus proper; posterior nasal aperture; toe; neural layer of retina
BioGPS	More reference expression data
Gene ontology
Molecular function	phosphoric diester hydrolase activity; hydrolase activity; 3',5'-cyclic-nucleotide phosphodiesterase activity; metal ion binding; 3',5'-cyclic-AMP phosphodiesterase activity
Cellular component	cytosol; cellular component
Biological process	cyclic nucleotide metabolic process; cAMP catabolic process; signal transduction; G protein-coupled receptor signaling pathway
Sources:Amigo / QuickGO
Orthologs
Species	Human	Mouse
Entrez	8622	218461
Ensembl	ENSG00000113231	ENSMUSG00000021684
UniProt	O95263	E9Q4S1
RefSeq (mRNA)	NM_001029851; NM_001029852; NM_001029853; NM_001029854; NM_003719 NM_001349748; NM_001349749; NM_001349750; NM_001349751; NM_001349752; NM_001349753	NM_001170669; NM_172263; NM_001346782; NM_001374003; NM_001374004 NM_001374005; NM_001374006; NM_001374007
RefSeq (protein)	NP_001025022; NP_001025023; NP_001025024; NP_001025025; NP_003710 NP_001336677; NP_001336678; NP_001336679; NP_001336680; NP_001336681; NP_001336682; NP_001362991; NP_001362992; NP_001362993; NP_001362994; NP_001362995; NP_001362996; NP_001362997; NP_001362998; NP_001362999; NP_001363000; NP_001363001; NP_001363002; NP_001363003; NP_001363004	NP_001164140; NP_001333711; NP_758467; NP_001360932; NP_001360933 NP_001360934; NP_001360935; NP_001360936; NP_001391617; NP_001391618; NP_001391619; NP_001391620; NP_001391621; NP_001391622; NP_001391623; NP_001391624; NP_001391625
Location (UCSC)	n/a	Chr 13: 95.16 – 95.39 Mb
PubMed search
- Wikidata
View/Edit Human	View/Edit Mouse

High affinity cAMP-specific and IBMX-insensitive 3',5'-cyclic phosphodiesterase 8B is an enzyme that in humans is encoded by the PDE8B gene.

== Clinical significance ==
PDE8B expression has been linked to higher survival rates for lung adenocarcinoma patients.
