= Bates-Geers House =

Historic house in Missouri, United States

- U.S. National Register of Historic Places
- Location within Missouri Location within the United States
- Location: East of Plata on Slabtown Rd., near Plato, Missouri
- Coordinates: 37°32′54″N 92°6′42″W
- Area: 0.1 acres (0.040 ha)
- Built: c. 1840
- Architectural style: Greek Revival
- NRHP reference No.: 82003159
- Added to NRHP: September 23, 1982

The Bates-Geers House, also known as Geers House, is a historic home located near Plato, Texas County, Missouri. It was built about 1840, and is a two-story, five-bay, Greek Revival style frame dwelling with a rear ell. It sits on a sandstone foundation and features massive sandstone end chimneys.

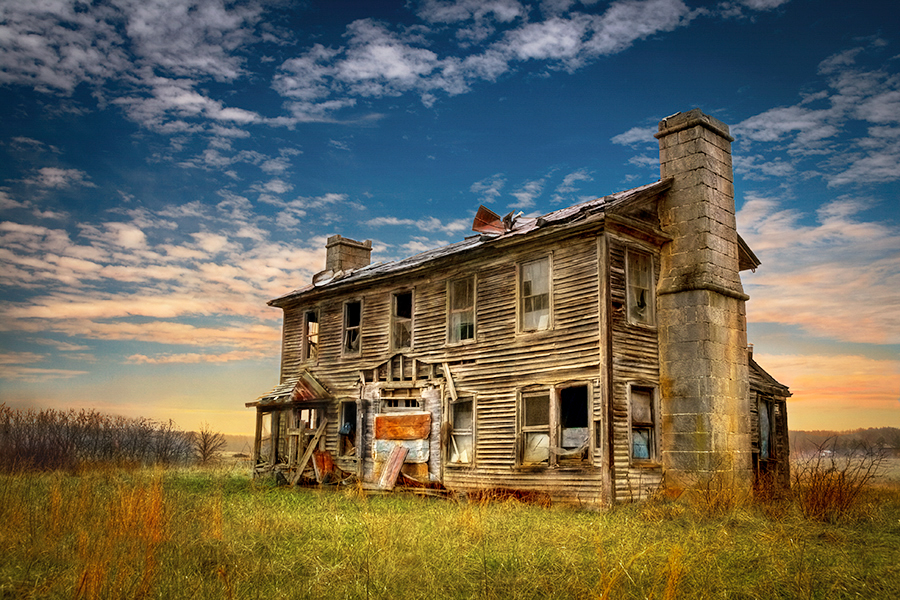
Bates-Geers house. Texas county Missouri

It was listed on the National Register of Historic Places in 1982.
