= David Back Log House and Farm =

Historic home and farm in Kentucky

- U.S. National Register of Historic Places
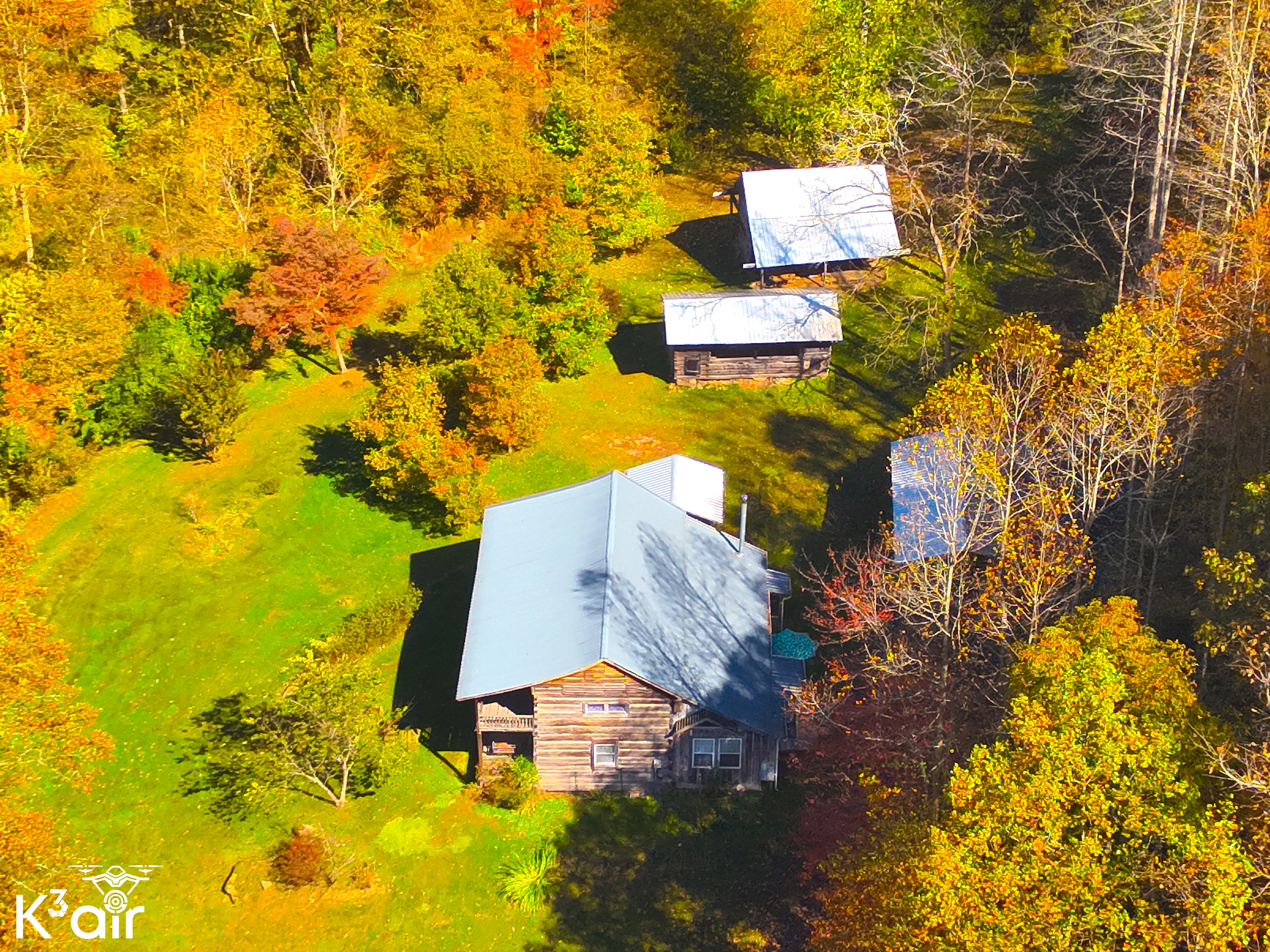

- Location within Kentucky
- Location: Elk Creek Rd., near Blackey in Letcher County, Kentucky
- Coordinates: 37.166667°N 82.968889°W
- Built: 1875
- NRHP reference No.: 100003680
- Added to NRHP: April 24, 2019

The David Back Log House and Farm, is a historic home and associated farm structures located near Blackey in Letcher County, Kentucky, was listed on the National Register of Historic Places in 2019. It has also been known as the Bates Log House and Barn.

It is a double-pen log house. The first pen was built in 1875 by William Dixon. The original, two story pen is 16 feet (4.9 m) by 17 feet (5.2 m); with a stone fireplace of considerable size at one end of the pen. Each story consists of one room. Access to the sleeping loft on the top level is accessed from the exterior of the house via a ladder. The second pen was built in approximately 1895 and was constructed onto the chimney side of the first pen. A second fireplace was then constructed in the newer pen, along with a staircase. Both sides of the structure had a single roof covering both of the pens. Prior to the 1940s, the only access between the two pens was through the exterior of the structure.

Dixon's sister Nancy married David Back, who bought house and farm in 1907. The site was named after David Back. For many years it was home to Mrs. Artie Ann Bates who was the great-granddaughter of Nancy and David Back.

The property was considered for listing as a historic site in 2018. It was accepted and listed on the register on April 24, 2019. The listing includes a log house, a smoke house, a corn crib, and a barn built c.1875 of local timber.

Its location was not disclosed by the National Register, it is Address restricted.
