= Rufus and Flora Bates House =

Historic house in New York, United States

- U.S. National Register of Historic Places
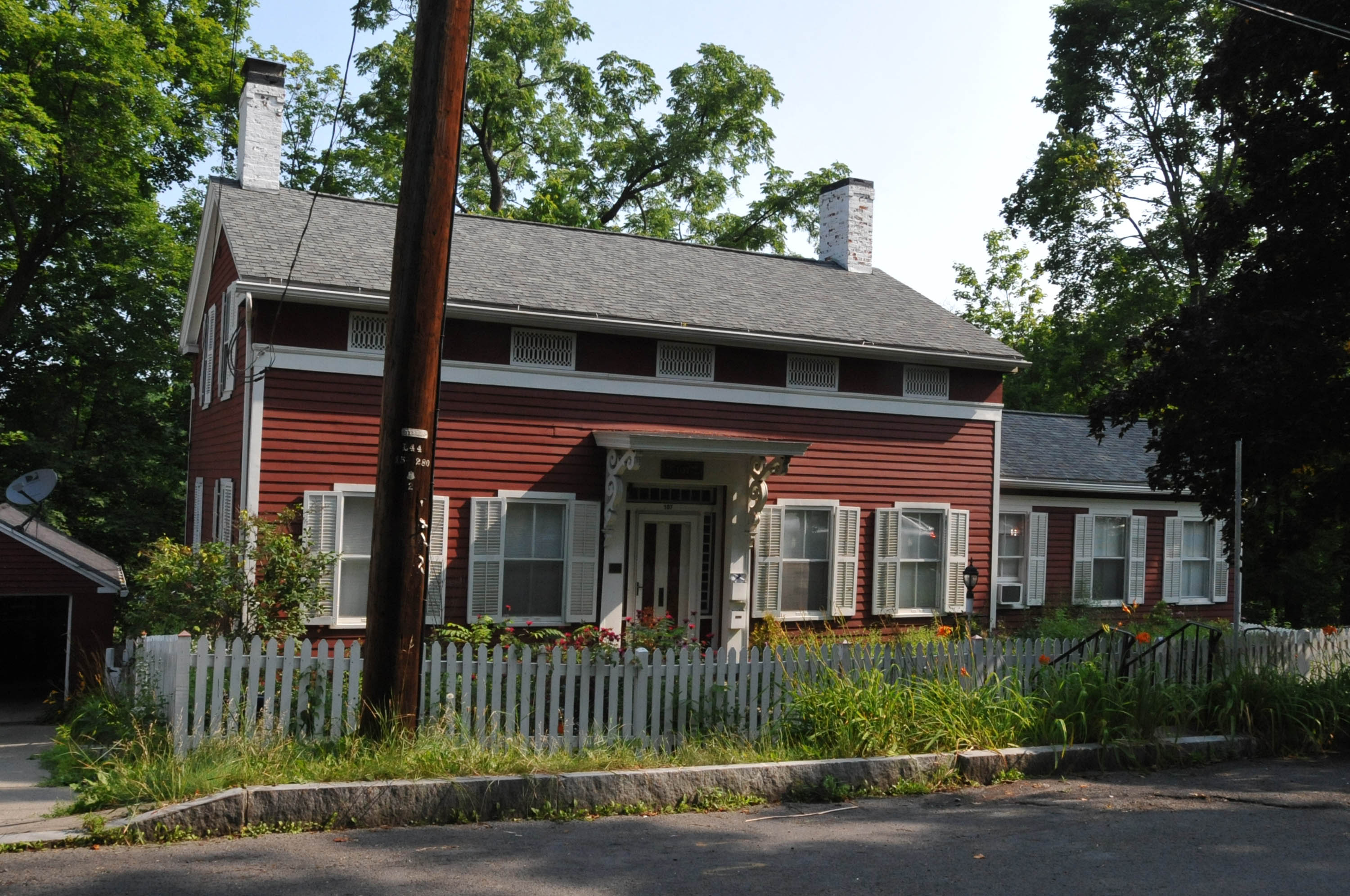

- Location within New York Location within the United States
- Location: 107 Giles St., Ithaca, New York
- Coordinates: 42°26′18″N 76°29′33″W
- Area: less than one acre
- Built: c. 1828
- Architectural style: Greek Revival
- NRHP reference No.: 10000595
- Added to NRHP: August 29, 2010

Rufus and Flora Bates House is a historic home located in the South Hill neighborhood of Ithaca in Tompkins County, New York. It was built about 1828 and is a 1 1/2-story, five-bay, center entrance frame dwelling in the Greek Revival style. It is sheathed in clapboard and has a three-bay wing. It was the home of Rufus Bates, one of the early presidents of the Village of Ithaca.

It was listed on the National Register of Historic Places in 2009.
