= Springhurst, Louisville =

Edge city of Louisville, Kentucky, USA

Coordinates: 38°18′10″N 85°33′50″W

Springhurst is a large, unincorporated area in Northeast Louisville, Kentucky, United States. Developed heavily in the 1990s, it is now considered an edge city of Louisville, and is home to one of the largest shopping areas in the city, with the largest concentration of shops along the Gene Snyder Freeway from Westport Road to Ballardsville Road. The Shopping Center was purchased in December 2023 by Kaden Companies and Marquee Capitol. Large residential areas also exist on either side of the shopping areas.

Its approximate boundaries are Brownsboro Road (KY 22) to the North, Hurstbourne Parkway to the West, Westport Road to the South, and the incorporated city of Fincastle to the East. Around 15,000 people live in the Springhurst area.
