= List of Windmill (sailing dinghy) championships =

This is a list of Windmill sailboat championships.

Championships
Year	Event Type	Location	Winner	Source
1953	Championship	Alachua Sailing Club, Florida	Francis Seavy & Unknown	
1954	Championship	Lake Ivanhoe, Florida	Charles Morgan & Unknown	
1962	National Championship	Davis Island Yacht Club	All Unknown	
1962	International Championship	Sarasota Sailing Squadron, Florida	David Posey & Unknown	
1963	National Championship	Bellport Bay Yacht Club, New York	All Unknown	
1964	National Championship	Bellport Bay Yacht Club, New York	All Unknown	
1966	National Championship	Reno, Nevada	All Unknown	
1966	International Championship	St. Petersburg Yacht Club, Florida	All Unknown	
1967	National Championship	Unknown	Paul Gernhardt & Unknown	
1967	International Championship	West River Sailing Club, Maryland	John Bear & Ed Bear	
1968	National Championship	Red Bank, New Jersey	Pat Hamilton & Augie Diaz	
1969	National Championship	Lake Arlington, Texas	John Bear & Unknown	
1969	International Championship	Fishing Bay Yacht Club, Virginia	Ed Laviano & Unknown	
1970	National Championship	Navy Sailing Squadron, Maryland	Dick Schmidt & Judy Schmidt	
1970	International Championship	Southern Yacht Club, Louisiana	John Dane III & Unknown	
1971	National Championship	Houston Yacht Club, Texas	All Unknown	
1971	International Championship	Bellport Bay Yacht Club, New York	Pat Hamilton & Nora Hamilton	
1972	National Championship	Tampa Sailing Squadron, Florida	Denis Fontaine & Unknown	
1973	National Championship	Old Point Comfort Yacht Club, Virginia	Denis Fontaine & Unknown	
1974	National Championship	Association Island, New York	Denis Fontaine & Unknown	
1974	International Championship	Houston Yacht Club, Texas	Denis Fontaine & Unknown	
1975	National Championship	Lake Fort Gibson, Oklahoma	Peter Fontaine & Keith Bradley	
1976	International Championship	Lake Gaston, North Carolina	Denis Fontaine & Greg Fontaine	
1977	Unknown	Pensacola Yacht Club, Florida	Denis Fontaine & Bill Whitehurst	
1978	Unknown	Kenlake Sailing Club, Kentucky	Sam Andras & Joan Andras	
1979	National Championship	Christchurch School, Virginia	Bob Rowland & Sandy Rowland	
1980	International Championship	Saratoga Lake Sailing Club, New York	Dave Ellis & Susie Ellis	
1981	National Championship	St. Andrews Bay Yacht Club, Florida	Alex Krumdieck & Richard Krumdieck	
1982	National Championship	Lake Fort Gibson, Oklahoma	Terry Wood & Betty Wood	
1984	National Championship	Lake Livingston, Texas	Craig Tovell & Craig Plotner	
1985	National Championship	Concord Yacht Club, Tennessee	Dave Ellis & Brandon Ellis	
1987	National Championship	Ware River Yacht Club, Virginia	Mark Swanson & Emmie Swanson	
1988	National Championship	Bay Point Yacht Club, Ohio	John Ingalls & Maura Ingalls	
1989	National Championship	Oriental Sailing Association, North Carolina	John Ingalls & Mike Mullahey	
1990	National Championship	Bristol Yacht Club, Rhode Island	Craig Tovell & Mike Graber	
1991	National Championship	St. Mary's College, Maryland	Mark Swanson & Emmie Swanson	
1992	National Championship	Lake Monroe Sailing Club, Indiana	Terry Wood & Betty Wood	
1993	National Championship	Percy Priest Yacht Club, Tennessee	Terry Wood & Betty Wood	
1994	National Championship	Oriental Sailing Association, North Carolina	John Danneburger & Anne Danneburger	
1995	National Championship	St. Andrews Bay Yacht Club, Florida	Terry Wood & Betty Wood	
1996	National Championship	Castine, Maine	Richard Fontana & Diane Ahmann	
1997	National Championship	Edenton Bay Yacht Club, North Carolina	Terry Wood & Betty Wood	
1998	National Championship	Coconut Grove Sailing Club, Florida	Terry Wood & Betty Wood	
1999	National Championship	Rock Hall Yacht Club, Maryland	Ethan Bixby & Trudy Bixby	
2000	National Championship	Ohio	Ethan Bixby & Trudy Bixby	
2001	National Championship	Edenton Bay Yacht Club, North Carolina	Ethan Bixby & Trudy Bixby	
2002	National Championship	Rock Hall Yacht Club, Maryland	Ken Deyett & Geoff Gibby AND Terry Wood & Betty Wood*	
2003	National Championship	Bristol Yacht Club, Rhode Island	Richard Fontana & Ed Fontana	
2004	National Championship	James Island Yacht Club, South Carolina	Ethan Bixby & Trudy Bixby	
2005	National Championship	Rock Hall Yacht Club, Maryland	Dave Ellis & M. Ruchrmund	
2006	National Championship	Rock Hall Yacht Club, Maryland	Dave Ellis & Lars Arnesen	
2007	National Championship	Edenton Yacht Club, North Carolina	Ethan Bixby & Trudy Bixby	
2008	National Championship	Lake Winnipesaukee Yacht Club, New Hampshire	Ethan Bixby & Amy Drinker	
2009	National Championship	Rock Hall Yacht Club, Maryland	Arthur Anosov & Danila Florianovich	
2010	National Championship	Lake Lanier Sailing Club, Georgia	John Jennings & Julie Valdez	
2011	National Championship	Rock Hall Yacht Club, Maryland	Ethan Bixby & Trudy Bixby	
2012	National Championship	Rock Hall Yacht Club, Maryland	Lin Robson & Erin McKie	
2013	National Championship	Fishing Bay Yacht Club, Virginia	Craig Tovell & Brendan Demler	
2014	National Championship	Hoover Sailing Club, Ohio	Ethan Bixby & Trudy Bixby	
2015	National Championship	Rock Hall Yacht Club, Maryland	Ralph Sponar III & Matthew Sponar	
2016	National Championship	River Dunes Harbor Club & Marina, North Carolina	Ethan Bixby & Trudy Bixby	
2017	National Championship	Erie Yacht Club, Pennsylvania	Ethan Bixby & Trudy Bixby	
2018	National Championship	Rock Hall Yacht Club, Maryland	Ethan Bixby & Trudy Bixby	
2019	International Championship	Fishing Bay Yacht Club, Virginia	Arthur Anosov & Maxim Anosov	
2020	National Championship	Cancelled due to the COVID-19 pandemic		
2021	National Championship	Erie Yacht Club, Pennsylvania	Ethan Bixby & Trudy Bixby	
2022	National Championship	Rock Hall Yacht Club, Maryland	Ethan Bixby & Trudy Bixby	
2023	National Championship	Hoover Sailing Club, Ohio	Ethan Bixby & Trudy Bixby	
2024	National Championship	Rock Hall Yacht Club, Maryland	Arthur Anosov & Sarah Steward	
2025	National Championship	Hoover Sailing Club, Ohio	Craig Tovell & Emma Hershey	
2026	National Championship	Rock Hall Yacht Club, Maryland	Ethan Bixby & Trudy Bixby	

*Note: In 2002, there was an incorrect initial scoring by the race committee, leading them to declare co-champions
