= Cyrus Bates House =

Historic house in New York, United States

- U.S. National Register of Historic Places
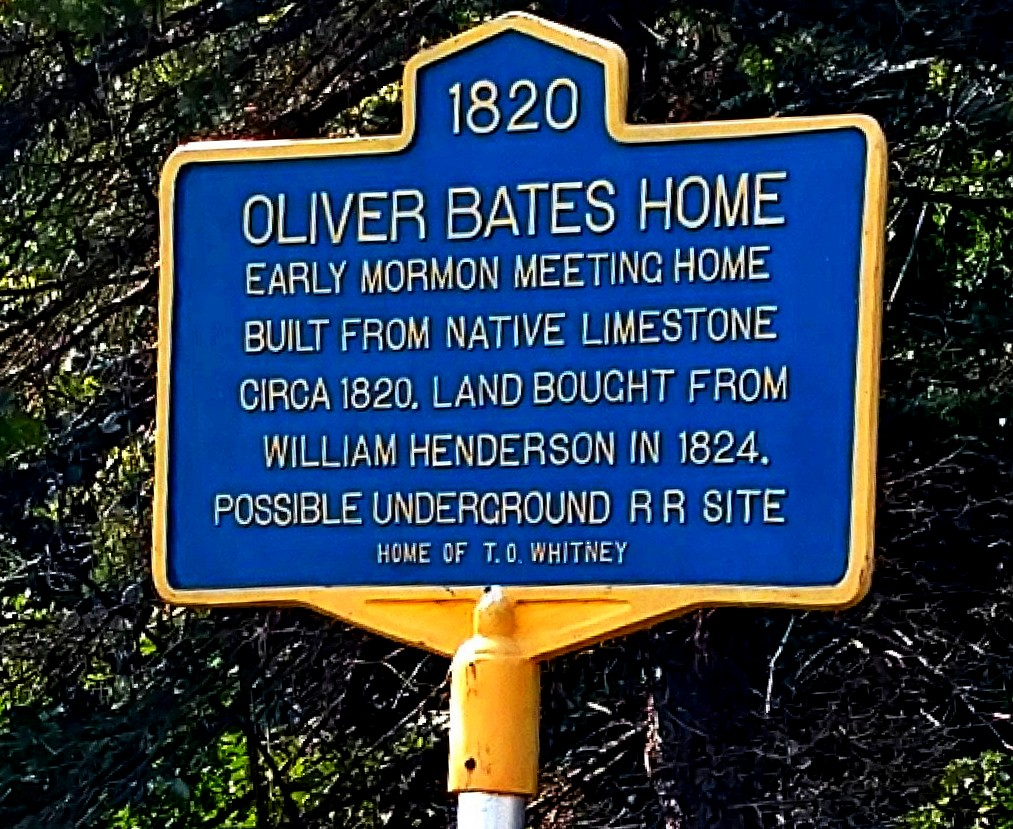
- Historical marker outside of Oliver Bates Home

- Location within New York Location within the United States
- Location: 7185 NY 3, Henderson, New York
- Coordinates: 43°49′28″N 76°12′8″W
- Area: 2.9 acres (1.2 ha)
- Built: 1820
- Architectural style: Federal
- NRHP reference No.: 04000710
- Added to NRHP: July 14, 2004

The Cyrus Bates House (also known as Oliver Bates House and the T. O. Whitney House) is a historic house located at 7185 NY 3 in Henderson, Jefferson County, New York.

== Description and history ==
The Federal style, single-family house was built in about 1820, and is situated on a 2.9 acre (1.2 ha) plot of land.

It was listed on the National Register of Historic Places on July 14, 2004.
