= Cyrus H. Wheelock =

Mormon missionary (1813–1894)

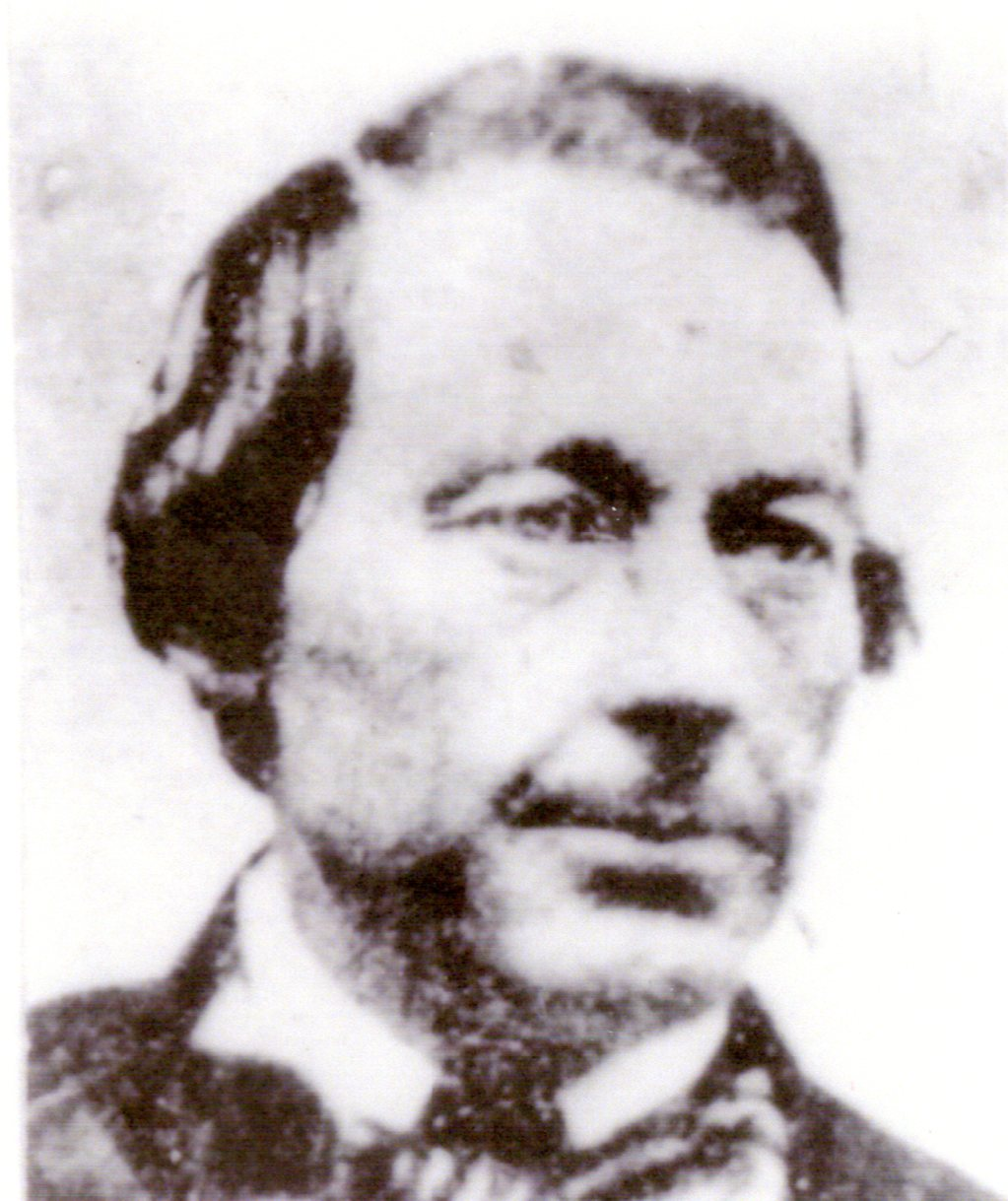
- Cyrus H. Wheelock

Personal details
- Born: Cyrus Hubbard Wheelock; February 28, 1813; Henderson, New York
- Died: October 11, 1894 (aged 81); Mount Pleasant, Utah Territory
- Occupation: Missionary and hymn-writer
- Notable works: "Ye Elders of Israel"
- Spouse(s): Olive Parrish; Jemima Rose; Mary Ann Broomhead; Mary Ann Dallin; Elizabeth Burgess Neslen; Louisa Godsall

Cyrus Hubbard Wheelock (February 28, 1813 – October 11, 1894) was an early missionary and leader in the Church of Jesus Christ of Latter-day Saints. He wrote the words to the Latter-day Saint hymn "Ye Elders of Israel".

Wheelock was born at Henderson, Jefferson County, New York. He was baptized a member of The Church of Jesus Christ of Latter-day Saints on September 1, 1839. Shortly afterward, he served as a missionary in Vermont.

In 1844, Wheelock tried to convince Governor Thomas Ford of Illinois to release Joseph Smith Jr. from Carthage Jail. Wheelock gave Smith the pistol which he had when the mob attacked the jail at Carthage.

Wheelock served three missions to England. He presided over the Manchester, Liverpool and Preston Conferences.

In 1853, Wheelock was a counselor to Isaac Haight, president of a camp of Latter-day Saints waiting to set out from Keokuk, Iowa. Wheelock was the captain of one of the pioneer companies that crossed the plains to Utah Territory. In 1854, Wheelock became the president of the 37th Quorum of the Seventy.

In 1856, Wheelock was part of a rescue party Brigham Young sent to assist the stranded pioneer companies including the Martin Handcart Company near the Sweetwater River in Wyoming. He served as chaplain of one of the rescue companies.

Wheelock settled in Mount Pleasant, Utah Territory. He wrote several hymns while living here.

In 1878 and 1879, Wheelock served as president of the Northern States Mission which then consisted of the states of Michigan, Wisconsin, Minnesota, Iowa and Illinois. He died in Mount Pleasant, Utah Territory.
