= Westcott Beach State Park =

State park in Jefferson County, New York

- Location within New York
- Type: State park
- Location: Route 3 Henderson, New York
- Nearest city: Watertown, New York
- Coordinates: 43°53′53″N 76°07′12″W
- Area: 318 acres (1.29 km^{2})
- Created: July 1, 1946
- Operator: New York State Office of Parks, Recreation and Historic Preservation
- Visitors: 127,115 (in 2014)
- Open: All year
- Website: Westcott Beach State Park

Westcott Beach State Park is a 318-acre (1.29 km^{2}) state park in Jefferson County, New York. The park is located at the eastern end of Lake Ontario in the Town of Henderson.

== Park description ==
Looking out over Lake Ontario at Westcott Beach State Park

Westcott Beach State Park offers a beach, a playground and playing fields, picnic tables and pavilions, a nature trail, a group campsite, hunting and fishing, a boat launch and docks, and a food concession. Trails for hiking, cross-country skiing and snowshoeing are available. The park also offers a campground with 168 campsites.

== See also ==
- List of New York state parks
