= Henderson, New York =

- Town
- Location within New York Location within the United States
- Coordinates: 43°50′58″N 76°11′21″W
- Country: United States
- State: New York
- County: Jefferson

Government
  - Type: Town Council
  - Town Supervisor: Karen Richmond (R)
  - Town Council: Members' List: • Carol Hall (R); • Matthew Owen (R); • Torre Parker-Lane (R); • Bryan Flagg (R)

Area
  - Total: 52.93 sq mi (137.10 km^{2})
  - Land: 41.18 sq mi (106.66 km^{2})
  - Water: 11.75 sq mi (30.44 km^{2})
- Elevation: 410 ft (125 m)

Population (2020)
  - Total: 1,438
  - Density: 34.9/sq mi (13.48/km^{2})
- Time zone: UTC-5 (Eastern (EST))
  - Summer (DST): UTC-4 (EDT)
- ZIP code: 13650 (Henderson); 13651 (Henderson Harbor); 13605 (Adams); 13685 (Sackets Harbor)
- Area code: 315
- FIPS code: 36-045-34055
- GNIS feature ID: 0979062
- Website: www.townofhendersonny.org

Henderson is a town in Jefferson County, New York, United States. The population was 1,438 at the 2020 census. The town is named after William Henderson, the original European-American land owner.

Henderson is in the western part of the county and is southwest of Watertown. The Great Lakes Seaway Trail runs through the town along New York State Route 3 and includes a monument to its founder, William E. Tyson.

== History ==
This area had long been occupied by the Onondaga people, a nation of the Iroquois Confederacy, a Native American coalition of tribes who controlled most of upstate and western New York around the Great Lakes by the 15th century. Because most nations of the confederacy had allied with the British in the American Revolutionary War, after the defeat of Britain the United States forced the Iroquois to cede most of their land in New York under the terms of the peace treaty. The tribes moved to Canada, where the British offered them land in what is now Ontario.

New York made available for sale millions of acres of the former Iroquois lands at very low prices in an effort to stimulate settlement and agricultural development of its western and upstate territories. It offered some land to veterans as payment for their service during the war. Speculators based in New York City bought huge portions of land and sold them later for development.

In 1801 Benjamin Wright surveyed and divided the town into lots, but settlers did not begin to arrive until 1802. Most settlers migrated from New England, which had limited lands available for farming. The town was officially organized in 1806 from territory previously part of the town of Ellisburg.

The Cyrus Bates House was listed on the National Register of Historic Places in 2004 and the Norton–Burnham House, the birthplace of architect Daniel Burnham, was added in 2016.

== Notable people ==
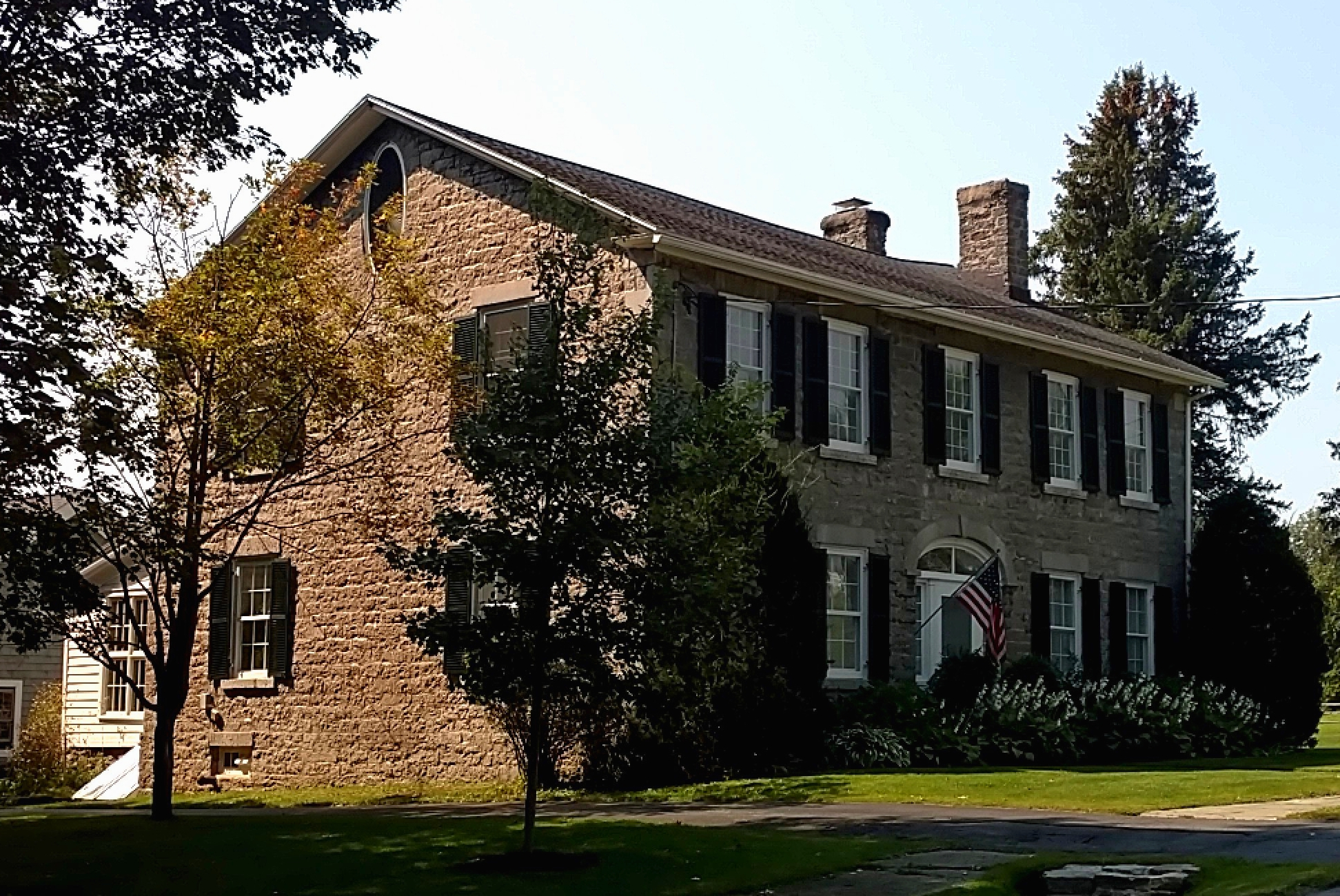
Norton–Burnham House, the birthplace of Daniel Burnham in Henderson

- Joseph Hawkins, (1781 – 1832) United States Representative
- Charles G. Finney, (1792 – 1875) Presbyterian minister, revivalist, abolitionist, coeducationalist, and 2nd president of Oberlin College
- Hiram Barney, (1811 – 1895) lawyer and abolitionist
- Horatio N. Davis, (1812 – 1907) member of the Wisconsin State Senate
- Cyrus H. Wheelock, (1813 – 1894) early Mormon missionary and hymn writer
- Mark Hopkins, (1813 – 1878) railroad magnate, one of the "Big Four" behind the Central Pacific Railroad
- Buel Hutchinson, (1826 – 1903) politician and lawyer
- John Watson Foster, (1836 – 1913) U.S. Secretary of State, ambassador and military officer, summered in Henderson Harbor
- Cushman Kellogg Davis, (1838 – 1900) son of Horatio N. Davis, governor and U.S. senator from Minnesota
- George Wilbur Peck, (1840 – 1916) governor of Wisconsin, mayor of Milwaukee, newspaper publisher and author of "Peck's Bad Boy" stories
- Daniel Burnham, (1846 – 1912) architect of several famous buildings, including the Flatiron Building in New York City, Union Station in Washington D.C., the Continental Trust Company Building tower skyscraper in Baltimore (now One South Calvert Plaza), and a number of notable skyscrapers in Chicago; urban planner of numerous cities
- John Foster Dulles, (1888 – 1959) United States Senator and U.S. Secretary of State, summered at Henderson Harbor.
- Allen Dulles, (1893 – 1969) first civilian director of the Central Intelligence Agency, summered at Henderson Harbor.
- Eleanor Lansing Dulles, (1895 – 1996) author, professor, and Government envoy.
- Craig Conroy, professional ice hockey player, two-time Olympian, and current assistant general manager of the Calgary Flames of the National Hockey League.

== Geography ==
According to the United States Census Bureau, the town has a total area of 52.9 square miles (137.1 km^{2}), of which 41.2 square miles (106.7 km^{2}) are land and 11.7 square miles (30.4 km^{2}), or 22.21%, are water. The western boundary of the town is Lake Ontario.

New York State Route 3 is a north-south highway. New York State Route 178 is an east-west highway, which intersects NY-3 at Aspinwall Corners.

== Demographics ==
Historical population
| Census | Pop. | Note | %± |
|---|---|---|---|
| 1820 | 1,919 | | — |
| 1830 | 2,428 | | 26.5% |
| 1840 | 2,480 | | 2.1% |
| 1850 | 2,239 | | −9.7% |
| 1860 | 2,419 | | 8.0% |
| 1870 | 1,926 | | −20.4% |
| 1880 | 1,842 | | −4.4% |
| 1890 | 1,688 | | −8.4% |
| 1900 | 1,615 | | −4.3% |
| 1910 | 1,485 | | −8.0% |
| 1920 | 1,229 | | −17.2% |
| 1930 | 1,165 | | −5.2% |
| 1940 | 1,163 | | −0.2% |
| 1950 | 1,171 | | 0.7% |
| 1960 | 1,207 | | 3.1% |
| 1970 | 1,364 | | 13.0% |
| 1980 | 1,330 | | −2.5% |
| 1990 | 1,268 | | −4.7% |
| 2000 | 1,377 | | 8.6% |
| 2010 | 1,360 | | −1.2% |
| 2020 | 1,438 | | 5.7% |
U.S. Decennial Census

As of the census of 2000, there were 1,377 people, 577 households, and 406 families residing in the town. The population density was 33.3 inhabitants per square mile (12.9/km^{2}). There were 1,557 housing units at an average density of 37.7 per square mile (14.6/km^{2}). The racial makeup of the town was 98.69% White, 0.22% Native American, 0.58% from other races, and 0.51% from two or more races. Hispanic or Latino of any race were 0.65% of the population.

There were 577 households, out of which 23.2% had children under the age of 18 living with them, 59.3% were married couples living together, 6.2% had a female householder with no husband present, and 29.6% were non-families. 23.9% of all households were made up of individuals, and 9.2% had someone living alone who was 65 years of age or older. The average household size was 2.39 and the average family size was 2.76.

In the town, the population was spread out, with 20.3% under the age of 18, 6.7% from 18 to 24, 24.3% from 25 to 44, 29.8% from 45 to 64, and 19.0% who were 65 years of age or older. The median age was 44 years. For every 100 females, there were 100.4 males. For every 100 females age 18 and over, there were 103.3 males.

The median income for a household in the town was $37,019, and the median income for a family was $45,357. Males had a median income of $32,050 versus $24,792 for females. The per capita income for the town was $20,071. About 8.1% of families and 11.1% of the population were below the poverty line, including 8.7% of those under age 18 and 5.6% of those age 65 or over.

== Communities and locations in Henderson ==
=== Communities and inhabited places ===
- Alexander Corners – A location southwest of Henderson village on NY-3.
- Aspinwall Corners – A location west of Henderson village on NY-3.
- Babbitt Corners – A location in the northeastern part of the town on County Road 71.
- Bishop Street – A location west of Butterville.
- Butterville – A hamlet by the eastern town line on County Road 75.
- Clark Point – A hamlet on the shore of Lake Ontario on Stony Point.
- Henderson – The hamlet of Henderson is on NY-178. It became an incorporated village in 1886, but subsequently dissolved the incorporation in 1992. The community is now a census-designated place.
- Henderson Harbor – A hamlet on the shore of Henderson Bay, The community was originally called "Naples" before 1820.
- Hungerford Corners – A hamlet west of Henderson village.
- Roberts Corners – A hamlet in the southeastern part of the town on NY-178 at County Road 75.
- Scotts Corners – A location near the southern town line on NY-178 at County Road 152.

=== Geographical features and locations ===
- Association Island – An island near the northern tip of Stony Point.
- Clark Point – A spit of land west of Sawyers Bay.
- Crystal Lake – A lake in the southeastern part of the town, also called "Sixtown Pond."
- Gravely Bay – A bay at the western tip of Stoney Point.
- Henderson Bay – An arm of Lake Ontario in the northwestern part of the town, partly defined by Stony Point and the mainland.
- Henderson Pond – A lake southwest of Henderson village.
- Hoveys Island – A location at the northern tip of Stony Point.
- Rays Bay – A bay at the southwestern tip of Stony Point.
- Robert G. Wehle State Park – A state park on Stony Point.
- Sawyers Bay – A bay located where Stony Point meets the mainland.
- Sawyer Point – A spit of land east of Sawyer Bay.
- Six Town Point – A location near the northern tip of Stony Point.
- Stony Creek – A stream flowing westward in the northern part of Henderson.
- Stony Point – A peninsula into Lake Ontario in the western part of the town.
- Westcott Beach State Park – A state park by the northern town line and Lake Ontario.
