= Crystal Lake (Henderson, Jefferson County, New York) =

- Location within New York Crystal Lake (the United States)
- Location: Jefferson County, New York, United States
- Coordinates: 43°49′45″N 76°07′37″W
- Type: Lake
- Primary outflows: Little Stony Creek
- Basin countries: United States
- Surface area: 177 acres (0.72 km^{2})
- Average depth: 14 feet (4.3 m)
- Max. depth: 24 feet (7.3 m)
- Shore length^{1}: 2.3 miles (3.7 km)
- Surface elevation: 423 feet (129 m)
- Settlements: Butterfield, New York
- ^{1} Shore length is not a well-defined measure.

Crystal Lake, also known as Sixtown Pond, is located near Butterville, New York. Fish species present in the lake are largemouth bass, walleye, northern pike, and yellow perch. There is a state owned carry down on Route 178, four miles east of Henderson. There is a 10 horsepower motor limit on Crystal Lake.
