= Negros Oriental Provincial Building =

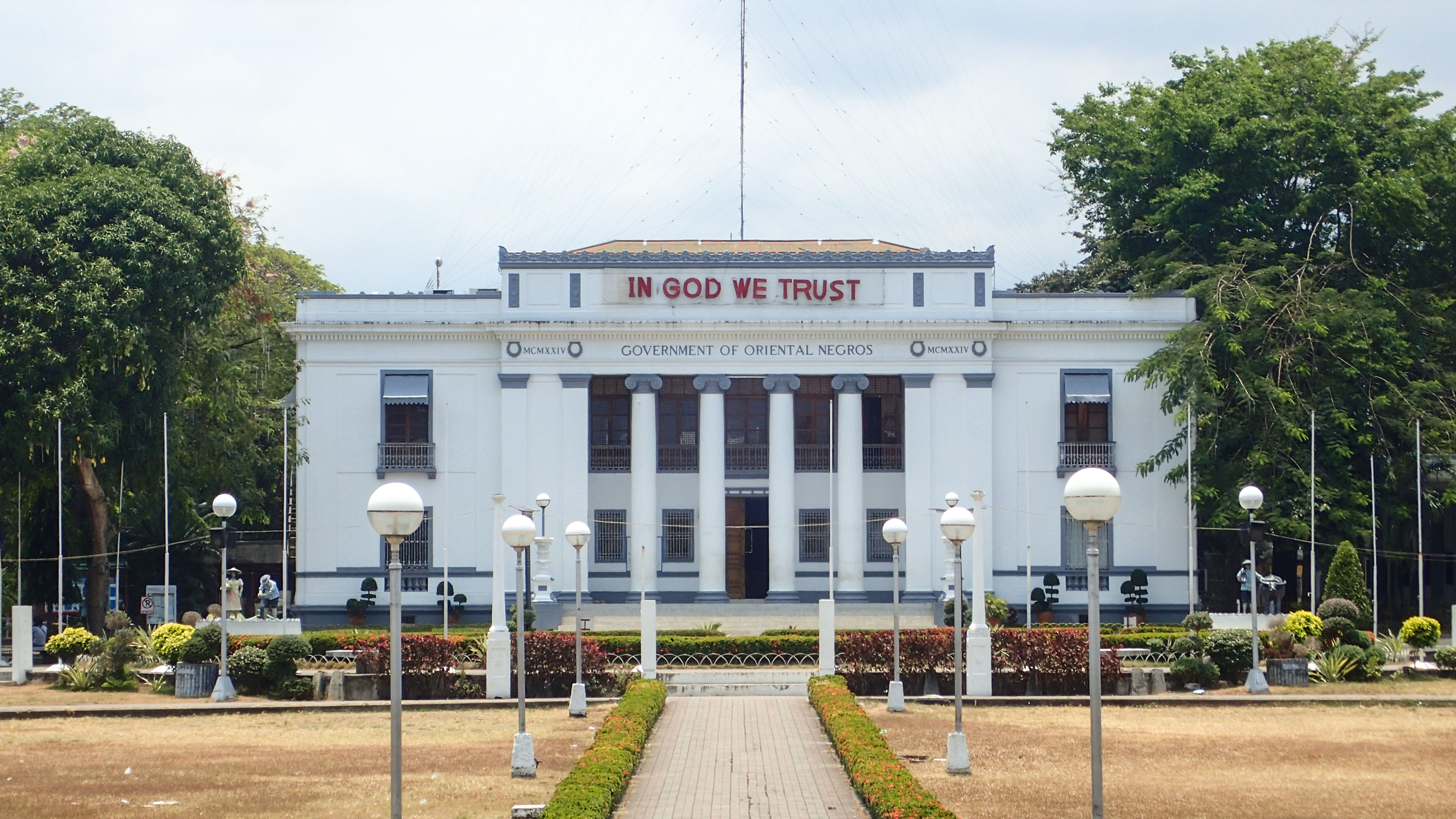
- Facade of Negros Oriental Provincial Capitol
- Interactive map of the Negros Oriental Provincial Building area
- Alternative names: Negros Oriental Provincial Capitol

General information
- Architectural style: Neoclassical
- Location: Dumaguete, Negros Oriental, Philippines
- Coordinates: 9°18′47.1672″N 123°18′6.822″E
- Completed: 1924

Technical details
- Floor area: 31m (Length) x 18m (Width)

Design and construction
- Architect: Daniel Burnham

The Negros Oriental Provincial Building or Negros Oriental Provincial Capitol is the seat of the provincial government of Negros Oriental in the Philippines.

== History ==
Daniel Burnham, an American city planner and architect, designed the provincial building, which was completed in 1924.

The building houses the office of the governor and other key provincial offices.

In 2024, the National Historical Commission of the Philippines installed a historical marker for the building.

== Architecture and fittings ==
The building is in neoclassical architectural style. It measured 31 metres (102 ft) in length by 18 metres (59 ft) in width. It was colored white and had four large Ionic columns in the entrance.
