= Robert G. Wehle State Park =

State park in Jefferson County, New York

- Location within New York
- Type: State park
- Location: 5182 State Park Road; Henderson, New York
- Nearest city: Watertown, New York
- Coordinates: 43°52′24″N 76°16′15″W
- Area: 1,067 acres (4.32 km^{2})
- Created: 2004
- Operator: New York State Office of Parks, Recreation and Historic Preservation
- Visitors: 75,842 (in 2014)
- Open: All year
- Website: Robert G. Wehle State Park

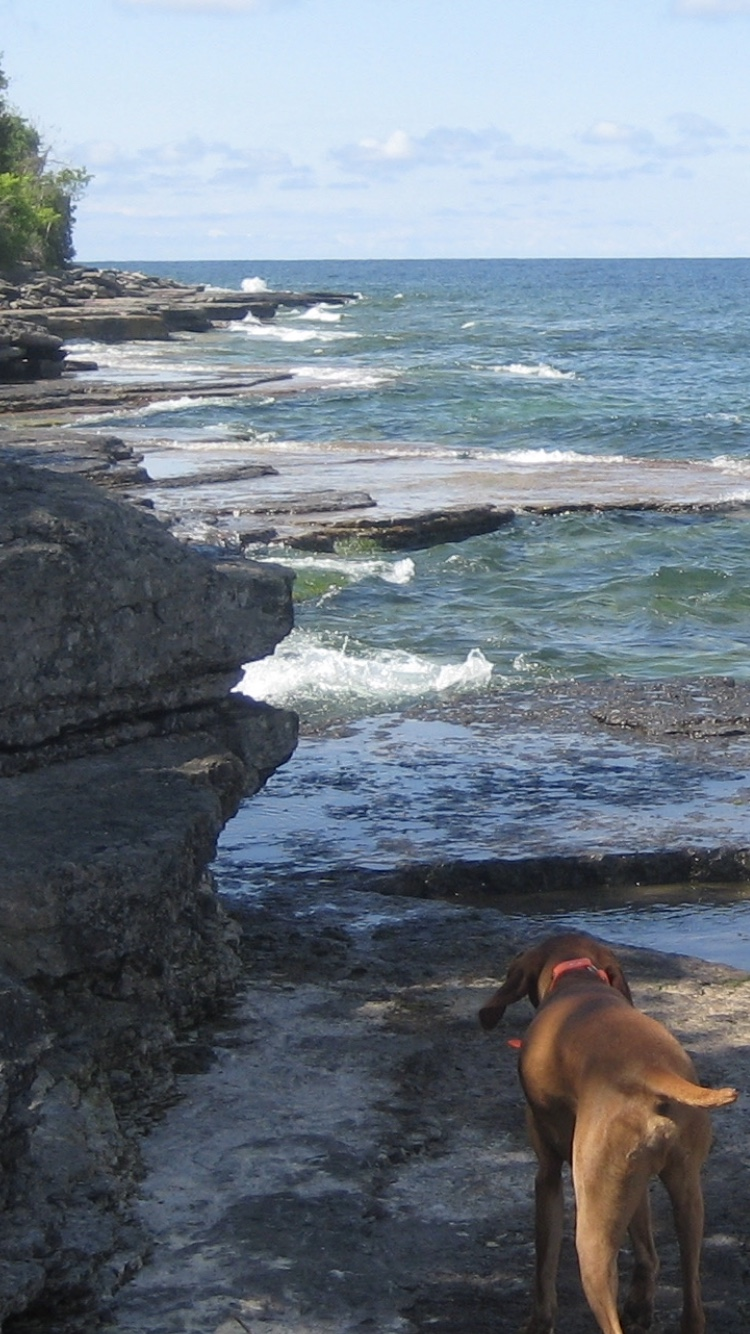
Limestone shoreline

Robert G. Wehle State Park is a 1,067-acre (4.32 km^{2}) state park on the eastern shore of Lake Ontario in the town of Henderson in Jefferson County, New York, United States.

== History ==
Between 1895 and 1947, the property was used by the United States Armed Forces as a training grounds, and was known as the Stony Point Rifle Range. The rifle range was used by Madison Barracks, Fort Ontario, and Pine Camp, now known as Fort Drum. The site was also used for artillery training, anti-aircraft training, and temporarily used as a landing field. Remnants of the site's military history are still visible at the park today.

The property was purchased in 1947 by Rochester car dealer Thomas Nagle and Genesee Brewing Company owner Louis A. Wehle for use as a Hereford cattle ranch. Louis Wehle's son, Robert G. Wehle, acquired the property in 1968. Robert G. Wehle was an avid conservationist, sculptor and breeder of English pointers, and founder of Elhew Kennels. Wehle used the property as a summer home and kennel. Several of Wehle's pointer sculptures can be found in the park, as well as dog kennels, and a dog cemetery. Prior to his death in 2002, he arranged for the property to be sold to the New York State Office of Parks, Recreation and Historic Preservation, who purchased the parkland for $2.8 million. The park was opened to the public in 2004.

== Park facilities ==
The park features multiple use trails for hiking, mountain biking, cross-country skiing and snowshoeing. Fishing is allowed in the park. Facilities for tennis and volleyball are available. Hunting is permitted in limited areas of the park. Approximately 17,000 feet (5,200 m) of Lake Ontario shoreline, some of which is fronted by limestone cliffs up to 80 feet (24 m) high, is accessible within the park. The park has an area for picnicking with ten picnic tables. The facility is located 1.2 miles from the parking area and is not accessible by car. In addition to picnic tables, there is an on-site outdoor grill, as well as a composting toilet, and beach access.

Several buildings, including Wehle's former summer home and studio, are available as short-term rentals.

== Trails ==
There are a total of thirteen trails in the park and all are named after Wehle's Elhew Kennels pointers. The longest trail, Snakefoot Trail is 4.9 miles, and the shortest, Jubilee Trail, is .12 miles. The trails are easy with little to no elevation gain, and relatively well marked. Trail markers are color-coded, illustrated with a pointer, and the name of the trail. Dogs are allowed on-leash throughout the park and on the trails.

The trails are:

Bobolink Trail-blue-.64 miles

Dancing Gypsy Trail-green- 1.87 miles

Huckleberry Trail-purple-.64 miles

Jubilee Trail-pink-.12 miles

Jungle Trail-brown- .86 miles

Kiwi Trail-dark pink-.42 miles

Knickerbocker Trail—black-.51 miles

Marksmen Trail—red-1.4 miles

Midge Trail-dark green-.98 miles

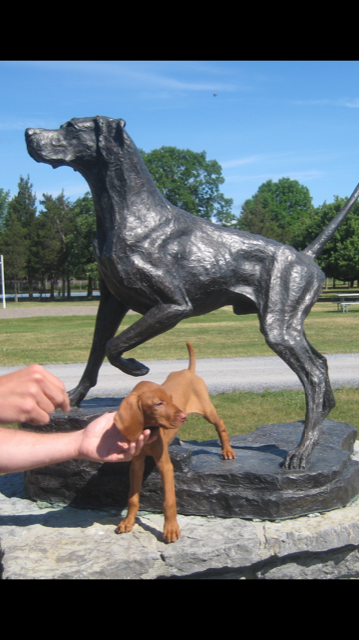
Robert G Wehle sculpture, Pointer

Misty Trail—white-.32 miles

Snakefoot Trail-yellow—4.9 miles

Tut Trail –light green-.32 miles

Zeus Trail—light blue-.51 miles

== Geology ==
The bedrock of the park consists primarily of Ordovician Period Rocks, as well as Lorraine, Trenton, and Black River Group, which can be seen in the dolomite and limestone shoreline. Other rocks in the park include siltstones, sandstones, and shale. Areas on the Snakefoot trail offer a good example of the limestone shelves on the shoreline of the park, as well as the limestone cliffs.

== Flora ==
=== Invasive species ===
The park has a large-scale infestation of pale swallow-wort (Cynanchum rossicum) that it actively maintains via mowing to limit spread. Pale swallow-wort, from the milkweed family, is considered an aggressive invasive that out-competes native flora and alters the environment that it impacts. Users are encouraged to check their shoes, clothing, and pets for seeds to help prevent the spread of pale swallow-wort.

== See also ==
- List of New York state parks
