= Joliet Public Library =

Public library system in Illinois, U.S.

- 41.5271°N 88.0823°W
- Location: Joliet, Illinois
- Established: 1876
- Branches: 2

Collection
- Size: est. 300,000

Access and use
- Circulation: 1 million
- Population served: 145,803 (2005 census)

Other information
- Director: Megan Millen (as of November 2016)
- Employees: 100
- Website: jolietlibrary.org

The Joliet Public Library (JPL) is the public library system serving the city of Joliet, Illinois. The Joliet Public Library was founded on March 7, 1876, with 750 donated books. The first librarian was Charlotte Akin. Today the majority of the 300,000 item collection resides in downtown Joliet at the Main Library, in a historic limestone building designed in by Daniel H. Burnham. On April 19, 1989, the library was firebombed.

== Locations ==
- The Main Library is located at 150 N. Ottawa St., Joliet, IL 60432. The building, built in 1903, was designed by Daniel Burnham and was expanded to its current size in 1989, the same year as the firebombing.
- The Black Road Branch (41.5373°N 88.1663°W) is located at 3395 Black Rd., Joliet, IL 60431.

== Library Board of Trustees ==
The Joliet Public Library Board is governed by a board of trustees. The trustees are appointed by the mayor for a two-year term. The library's board of trustees is responsible for establishing library policy, authorizing services provided by the library, establishing the library budget, hiring the library director, and requesting the collection of the designated library millage.

- President - Gail Gawlik
- Vice President – Diane M. Harris
- Secretary – Elaine Bottomley
- Treasurer – Nancy K. Henricksen
- Trustee – Kelly Rohder-Tonelli
- Trustee – Emita R. Ostrem
- Trustee – Lynn Poper Samalea
- Trustee – Dr. Jack Markley

== Local history collection ==
The Joliet Public Library's local history section contains a significant amount of information about the history of Joliet and Will County. Among other things the collection contains a nearly complete collection of Joliet newspapers dating back to the 1860s on microfilm, city directories for the city of Joliet dating back to the 1870s, and high school yearbooks for Joliet Township High School dating back to the early 1900s. The collection is often visited by genealogists from around the world who are researching family from Joliet or Will County.

== Firebombing ==
Then-director James Johnson amidst the debris left after the firebombing.

On April 19, 1989, the Joliet Public Library was firebombed, destroying the non-fiction section of the children's area, closing the entire library for 9 days, and closing the children's section for several months.
