= Norton–Burnham House =

Historic house in New York, United States

- U.S. National Register of Historic Places
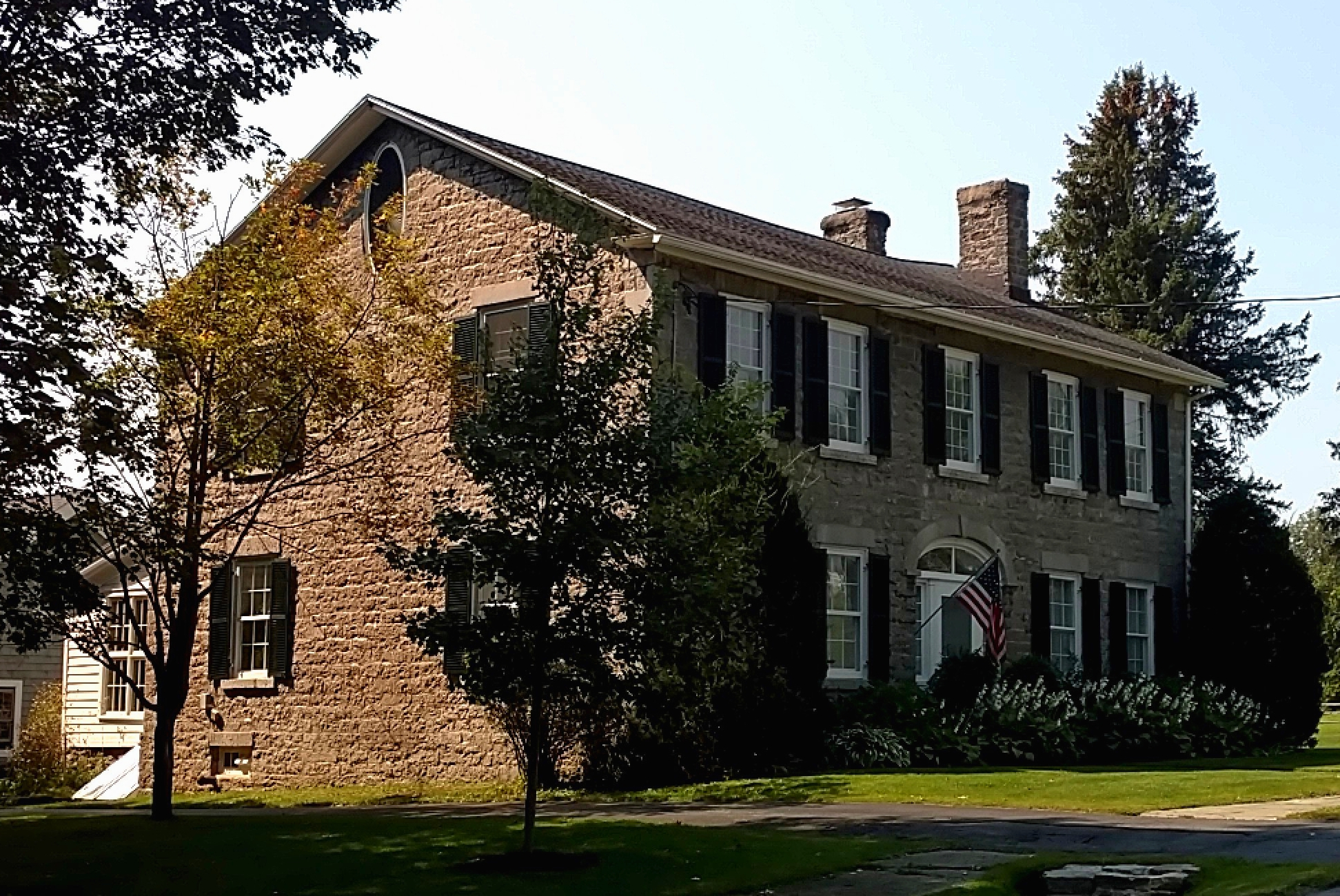
- Norton-Burnham House, birthplace of Daniel Burnham

- Location within New York Location within the United States
- Location: 8748 NY 178, Henderson, New York
- Built: 1818
- Architectural style: Vernacular stone
- NRHP reference No.: 16000034

The Norton–Burnham House, (also known as the Chester Norton House; Daniel Hudson Burnham Birthplace) is a historic house located at 7185 NY 3 in Henderson, Jefferson County, New York.

The limestone house was built by Chester Norton, one of the original settlers of the community. Daniel Burnham, the noted architect, urban planner, and key proponent of the City Beautiful Movement, was born in the house in 1846.
