= Fleming Building =

- U.S. National Register of Historic Places
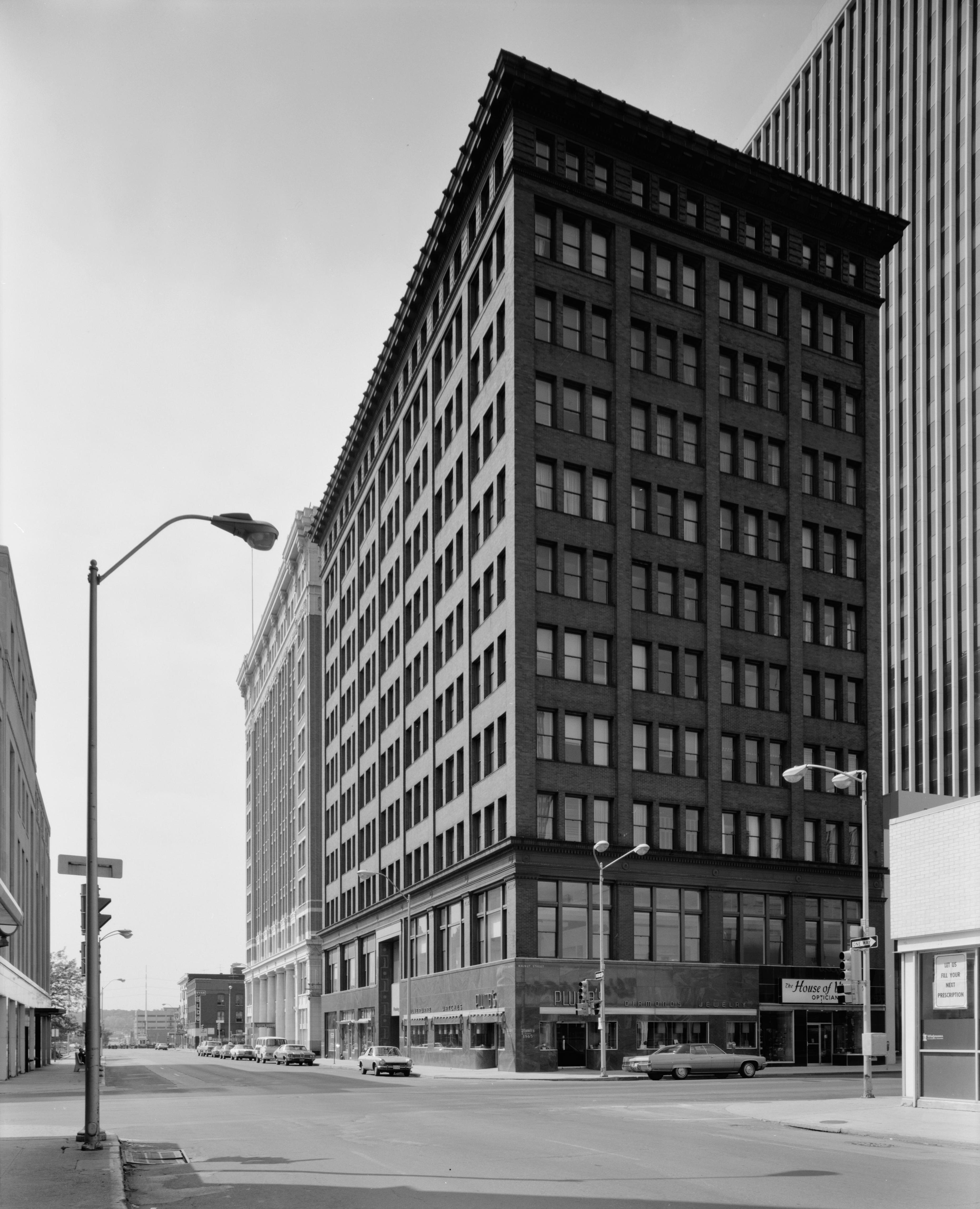

- Location within Iowa Location within the United States
- Location: 218 6th Ave., Des Moines, Iowa
- Coordinates: 41°35′8″N 93°37′29″W
- Built: 1907
- Architect: D.H. Burnham and Company
- Architectural style: Early Commercial
- NRHP reference No.: 02000541
- Added to NRHP: May 22, 2002

The Fleming Building is a historic building located in downtown Des Moines, Iowa, United States. It was listed on the National Register of Historic Places in 2002.

== Architecture ==
The structure is an eleven-story office building that rises 174 feet (53 m) above the ground. The Chicago architectural firm of D.H. Burnham and Company designed the building in the early Commercial style and it was completed in 1909. It is one of the earliest steel-framed buildings in Iowa. Elements of the Beaux-Arts style are found in the building's proportions and details, which is typical of the Burnham Company's work.
