= Association Island =

Island in Jefferson County, New York, United States

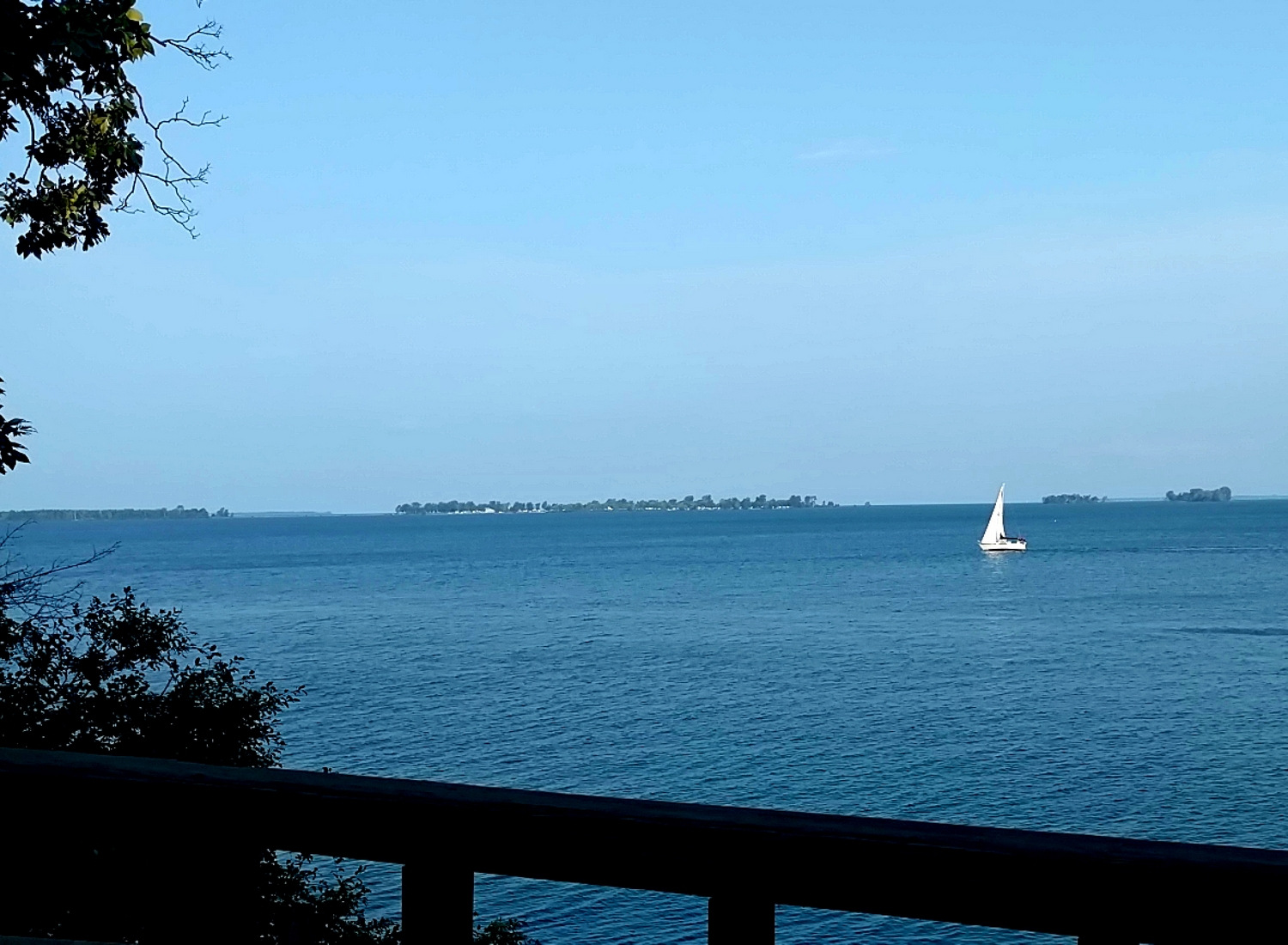
- Association Island

- Location within New York

Geography
- Location: Lake Ontario
- Coordinates: 43°53′42″N 76°12′54″W
- Area: 65 acres (26 ha)
- Highest elevation: 249 ft (75.9 m)

Administration
- United States
- State: New York
- County: Jefferson
- Town: Henderson

Association Island is a 65-acre (0.26 km^{2}) island located at the northern tip of Stony Point, a peninsula on the eastern shore of Lake Ontario. A part of the Town of Henderson, New York in Jefferson County, the island is about 16 miles (26 km) southwest of Watertown. A 1,300-foot (400 m) two-lane causeway connects the island to the mainland.

== History ==
Association Island was once part of a continuous protrusion of land known in the 19th century as Six Town Point. The name was in reference to the town of Henderson being recorded as the sixth of 11 unnamed towns that were delineated during a 1796 survey of the Black River Tract. Erosion from Lake Ontario waves divided Six Town Point into several small islands at some time prior to 1898.

A fort of French construction briefly existed upon Six Town Point during the 18th century. It is uncertain exactly who constructed the fort, and precisely when it was constructed; however it was likely built in 1756 under the order of General Montcalm during the French and Indian War, just prior to his victory at the Battle of Fort Oswego in August 1756. The small fort, approximately 70 feet (21 m) long on each side, was likely abandoned soon after that battle.

In 1905 the National Electric Light Association bought the island, which resulted in the name "Association Island". NELA management used it for meetings. General Electric, after it acquired NELA in 1911, also used the island for company meetings.

The Elfun Society, a management organization and think-tank within General Electric, was founded on the island in 1928. The society's logo was a drawing of a large elm tree from the island. General Electric donated the island to the YMCA in 1959, and the Elfun Society was dissolved by General Electric in 2014.

After receiving the island in 1959, the YMCA ran a boy's summer camp on the island for several years until abandoning it after 1967.

A non-profit group ran sailing and Boardsailing competitions on the island in the 1970s. The US sailing team was based there while preparing for the 1976 Montreal Olympics, which held sailing competitions at Kingston, Ontario, about 30 miles (48 km) to the north.

The island became a privately owned RV park and resort in 1999. The RV park currently operates as "Sun Outdoors Association Island" with an address of 15530 Snowshoe Rd. Henderson, NY 13650.

== In popular culture ==
Kurt Vonnegut based some of the material in his 1952 novel Player Piano on General Electric's meetings and activities at the island, and claimed that the island was "shut down" after the book was widely read in Schenectady, New York, the location of the company's headquarters.
