= Benjamin Bates II =

Personal details
- Born: Edinburgh, Scotland
- Died: 12 May 1790 (aged 74) Little Missenden
- Relations: See Bates family

Benjamin Edward Bates II (13 March 1716 – 12 May 1790) was a British physician, art connoisseur, and socialite. Born into wealth, he was a prominent member of society and was selected to become a member of the Sir Francis Dashwood's Hellfire Club, The Monks of Medmenham. He is the great-great-grandfather of Benjamin Bates IV, founder of Bates College.

== Life and career ==
Details of Bates early life are sketchy. He was born around 12 May 1716, somewhere in the North of England and was to have studied medicine in Edinburgh, though Benedict Nicolson, states that there is no record of a Benjamin Bates graduating in medicine from Edinburgh University at that time. Bates lived in Derby for a time, either as a child or after his studies.

Around 1758 he bought a house at Rickford's Hill, in Aylesbury in Buckinghamshire, and set up as a general practitioner. He was married twice and had one daughter, Lydia. He may have worked as Sir Francis Dashwood's personal physician; he is referred to as such in Jemmy Twitcher, George Martelli's book on John Montagu, 4th Earl of Sandwich, and certainly intended to accompany Dashwood in the role of physician on a tour of Europe. Sometime before 1774 Bates moved out to Little Missenden, though he kept his practice in Aylesbury.

Bates lived a life of excess which included joining the Hellfire Club at Medmanham. Membership of the club can only be guessed at, as only patchy, pseudonymous records survive, but despite apparently having become a member in the "second wave", E. Beresford Chancellor places Bates in the ranks of the superiors in his 1925 The Lives of the Rakes: Volume IV, The Hell Fire Club, alongside Sir Francis Dashwood, Sir Thomas Stapleton, Sir John Dashwood, John Wilkes, Charles Churchill, Paul Whitehead, Robert Lloyd, George Bubb-Dodington, George Augustus Selwyn, Sir William Stanhope, the Earl of Sandwich and Sir John D'Aubrey. Long after scandal and ridicule had forced the club into abeyance Bates continued to defend it. Even after the club's suspension he continued to live a life of luxury often purchasing silk in massive volumes to line the interior of his house and other private properties.

Bates was patron of the arts, buying important works by Joseph Wright of Derby (Three Persons Viewing the Gladiator by Candlelight and An Experiment on a Bird in the Air Pump) and by his close friend, John Hamilton Mortimer (St Paul Preaching to the Ancient Britons). In 1781 he gave up his practice in order to accompany Sir Francis Dashwood (by this time Francis Lord le Despencer) on a tour of the continent. Unfortunately Dashwood died before the trip began and Bates did not receive the huge annuity promised him for his services. Nevertheless, he was still intent on visiting Europe, Rome in particular, and made a tour to Italy in 1787 accompanied by his daughter before his 1790 death.

== See also ==
- Hell Fire Club
- Bates family
