= Bates Mill =

Textile factory in Lewiston, Maine, United States

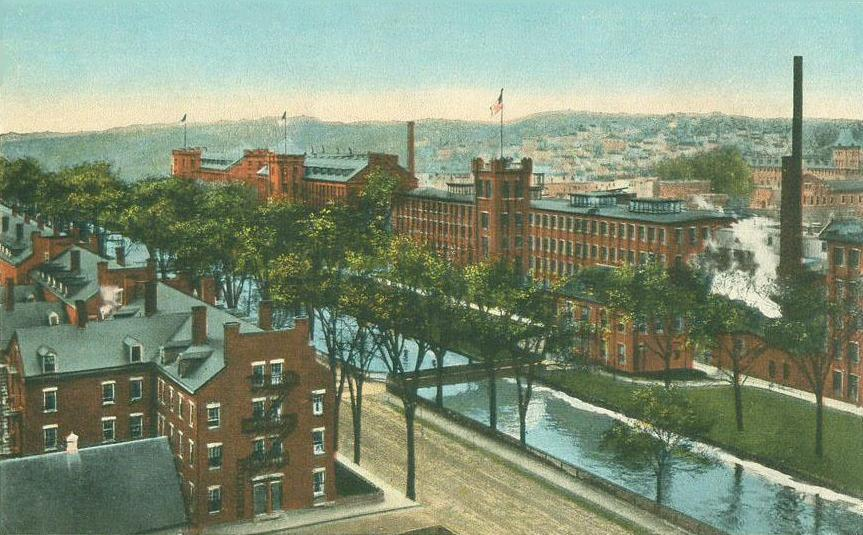
Mills and canal in c. 1915

The Bates Mill is a textile factory company founded in 1850 and located at 35 Canal Street in Lewiston, Maine. The mill served as Maine's largest employer through the 1860s, and early profits from the mill provided much of the initial capital for nearby Bates College. Currently, the mill buildings are home to several new businesses, apartments, and a small museum.

Maine Governor John Hubbard signed the incorporation act on August 16, 1850, and Mill #1 was completed in 1852. Bates built the mill in Lewiston due to its location at Lewiston Falls, which initially provided power to the mill.

== History ==
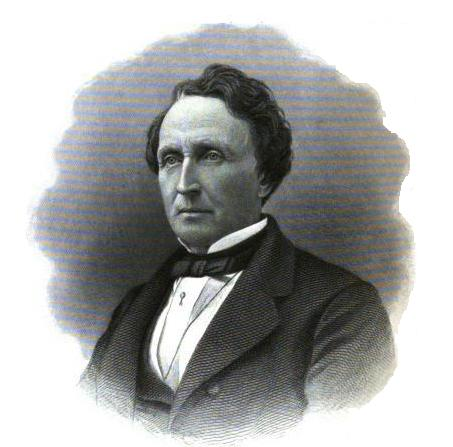
Benjamin Bates, founder of the Bates Mill and nearby Bates College

Benjamin Bates, a Boston entrepreneur, founded the textile mill in 1850 with several co-investors in the Bates Manufacturing Company. Maine Governor John Hubbard signed the incorporation act on August 16, 1850, and Mill #1 was completed in 1852. Bates built the mill in Lewiston due to its location at Lewiston Falls, which initially provided power to the mill. The Mill was operated by water power from the Androscoggin River, and combined power spinning and weaving on looms. The Mill produced textiles until the 21st century. During the American Civil War, the factory produced textiles for the Union Army with southern cotton it had stockpiled prior to the War. Thousands of immigrants from Canada and Europe immigrated to Lewiston to gain employment at the mills.

The mill complex, as the Bates Mill Historic District, was listed on the National Register of Historic Places in 2010.

== Today ==
Currently, the rehabilitated Bates Mill Complex is the site of Baxter Brewing Co., TD Bank, Androscoggin Savings Bank offices and The Symquest Group, Fishbones Casual Fine Dining Restaurant, Davinchi's Italian Restaurant, Grand Rounds, Northeast Bank, Bates Mill Dermatology, Community Health Options, Cross Insurance and Museum L-A: The Story of Work and Community in Lewiston-Auburn. There are now almost 2,000 people living and working in the Bates Mill Complex.

On July 15, 2009, Bates Mill Building No. 5 briefly caught on fire from embers from the nearby Cowan Mill which was completely destroyed by fire. Building No. 5, a 356,000-square-foot (33,100 m^{2}) weaving shed, was designed by Albert Kahn and placed in service in 1914. The structure was owned by the city of Lewiston, Maine, was vacant for several years, and was slated for demolition as recently as 2009, until its rebirth as a technology center in 2017 when healthcare technology company Grand Rounds leased 22,00 square feet in Bates Mill No. 6 to establish an east coast center employing up to 200 Maine residents.

On January 5, 2011, The Lofts at Bates Mill was awarded $5.2 million in low-income housing tax credits by the Maine State Housing Authority to convert Building No. 2 into 48 mixed-income apartments. The $9.2 million project includes 33 subsidized apartments and 15 market-rate apartments. Construction began 2011 and the apartments were completed late in 2012.

== See also ==
- Bates College
- Museum L-A
- National Register of Historic Places listings in Androscoggin County, Maine
