= Maine MILL =

Historic museum in Lewiston, Maine

Coordinates: 44.0953°N 70.2187°W

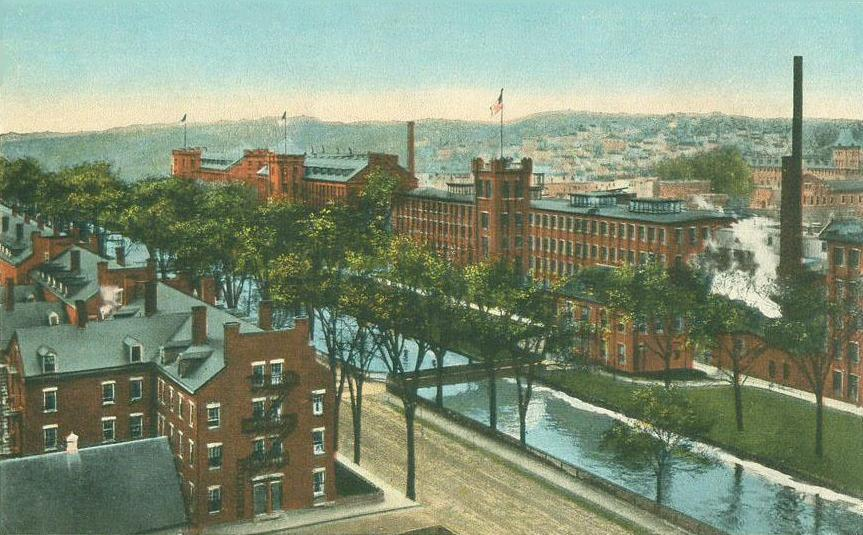
Mills and canal in c. 1915

Maine Museum of Innovation, Learning and Labor (Maine MILL) is located in the Bates Mill Historic District, in Lewiston, Androscoggin County, Maine.

Maine Museum of Innovation, Learning and Labor (Maine MILL) is a history and culture museum in downtown Lewiston, Maine.

== Features ==
The museum features gallery exhibits, programming, and events that explore how life, labor, and culture shape the present and influence the future. Located in Lewiston, Maine, with a collection of salvaged manufacturing machinery and artefacts, archival photographs, and oral histories.

The Bates Mill Historic District is on the National Register of Historic Places.

== See also ==
- Industry museums in Maine
- National Register of Historic Places listings in Androscoggin County, Maine
- Textile museums in the United States
