= John Grenville Bates =

John Grenville Bates Sr.
- Born: John Grenville Bates; August 20, 1880; New York City, U.S.
- Died: February 2, 1944 (aged 64); New York City, U.S.
- Burial place: Orange, New Jersey, U.S.
- Occupation: President of Westminster Kennel Club 1936-1937, Show Chairman 1928-1934.
- Known for: Co-founder of The American Kennel Club
- Spouse: Anita Teresa Boulton
- Children: 3
- Parent(s): Alfred Willard Bates, Catherine Cephise Towar Bates
- Relatives: Bates family

John Grenville Bates Sr (/beɪtɛs/; August 20, 1880 – February 2, 1944) was a co-founder of the American Kennel Club and former President and Show Chairman of the Westminster Kennel Club Dog Show. He won back-to-back dog shows with his Irish Terrier Pendley Calling of Blarney in 1930 and 1931. He was on the front cover of TIME Magazine Volume XXXI, No. 8.
