= Daniel S. Douglas =

Daniel S. Douglas was a Whig nominee in the 1852 U.S Presidential Election from California. He received one vote as a write-in, in the 37th ballot of the Whig Presidential nomination at the 1852 Whig National Convention. He was beat out by Winfield Scott for the presidential nomination 7136:1. Some people at the time the vote was cast, believed it was intended for famous abolitionist, Frederick Douglass.
