= Cowan Mill =

- Formerly listed on the U.S. National Register of Historic Places
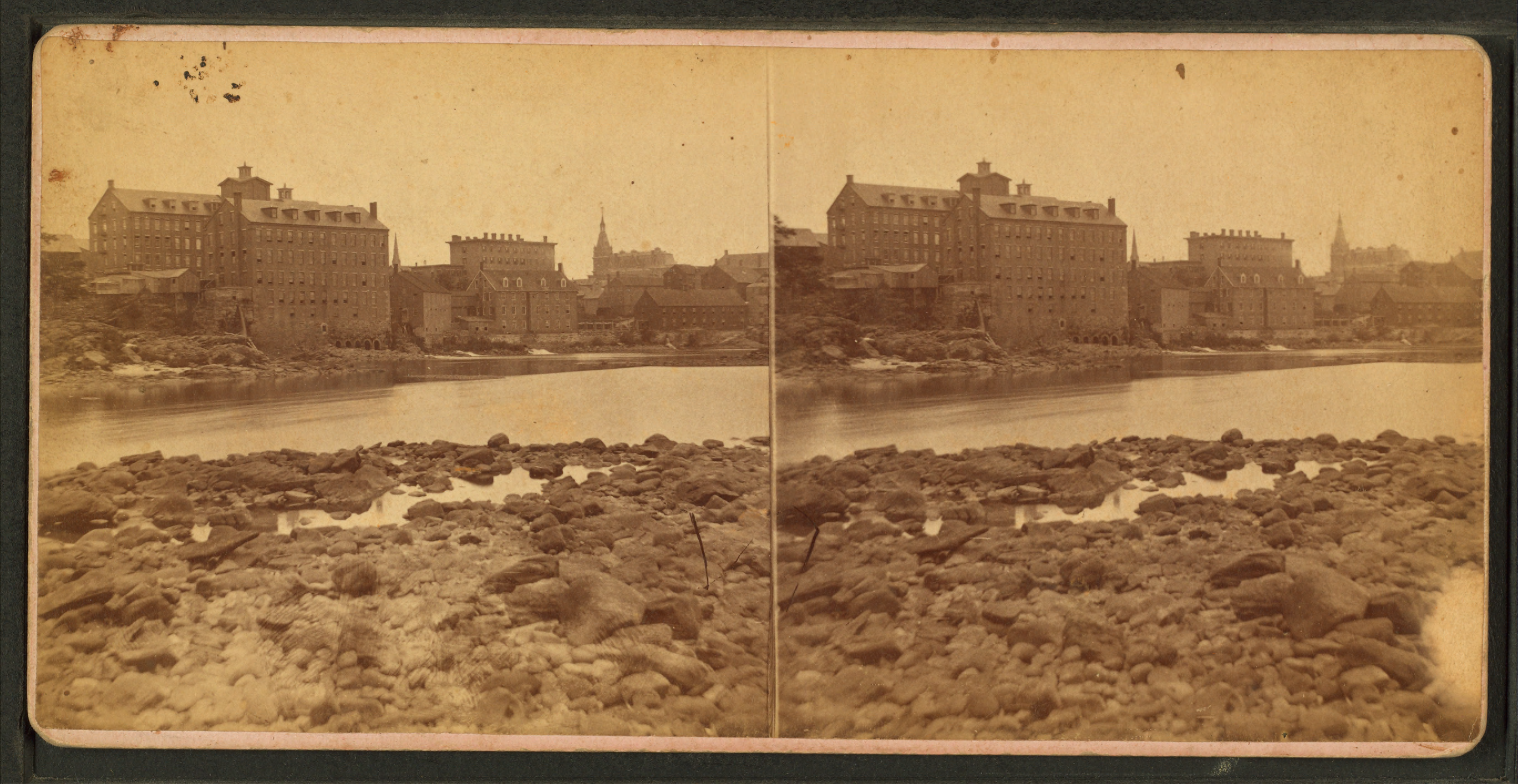
- Cowan Mill and Frye's Mill in a mid-1800s stereoview

- Location within Maine Location within the United States
- Location: Lewiston, Maine
- Coordinates: 44°5′55″N 70°13′18″W
- Built: 1850
- Architectural style: Greek Revival
- NRHP reference No.: 85001656

Significant dates
- Added to NRHP: August 1, 1985
- Removed from NRHP: November 2, 2011

Cowan Mill (also known as the Aurora Mill or Cowan Woolen Company Mill) was a historic mill at Island Mill Street in Lewiston, Maine.

The 4-story Greek Revival mill was built in 1850 on the site of Lewiston's first textile mill (built by John A. Briggs in 1836 and destroyed by fire in March 1850). David Cowan was twice elected mayor of Lewiston. The mill was added to the National Register of Historic Places in 1985.

On July 15, 2009, the Mill was completely destroyed under suspicious circumstances in a massive fire. Six days later, Justice Thomas E. Delahanty II ordered the mill be destroyed due to it being unsafe. Chabot Construction Company carried out the order the same day.

The mill was removed from the National Register of Historic Places on November 2, 2011.
