= 1852 Whig National Convention =

U.S. political event held in Baltimore, Maryland

- 1852 presidential election
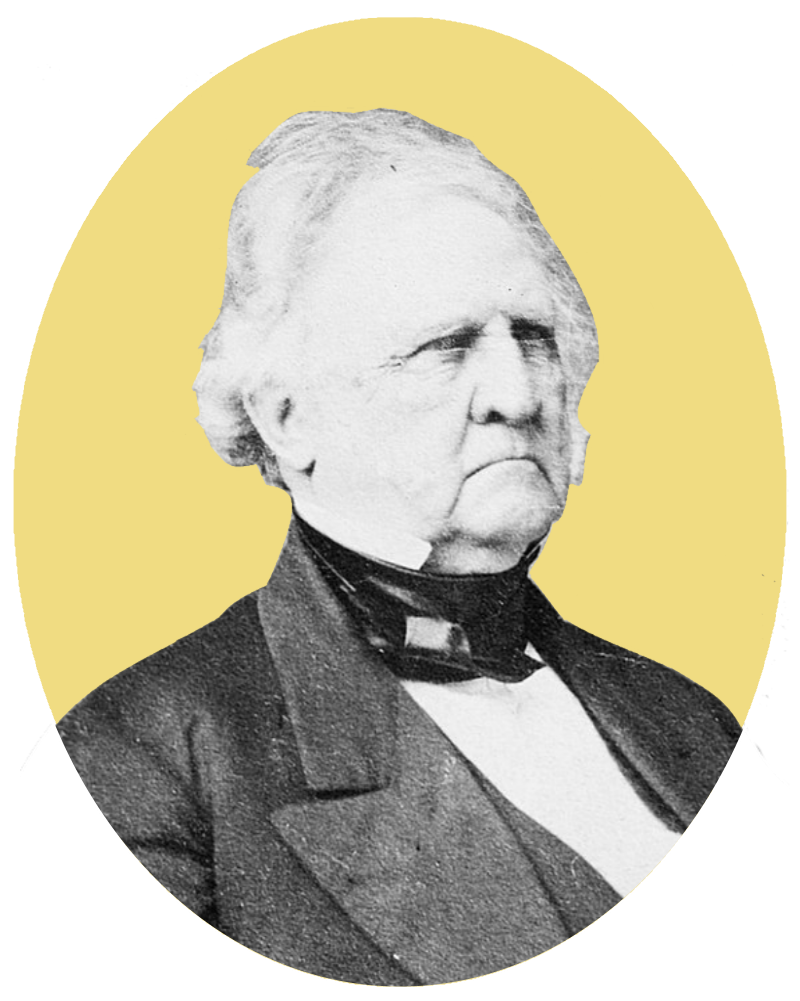
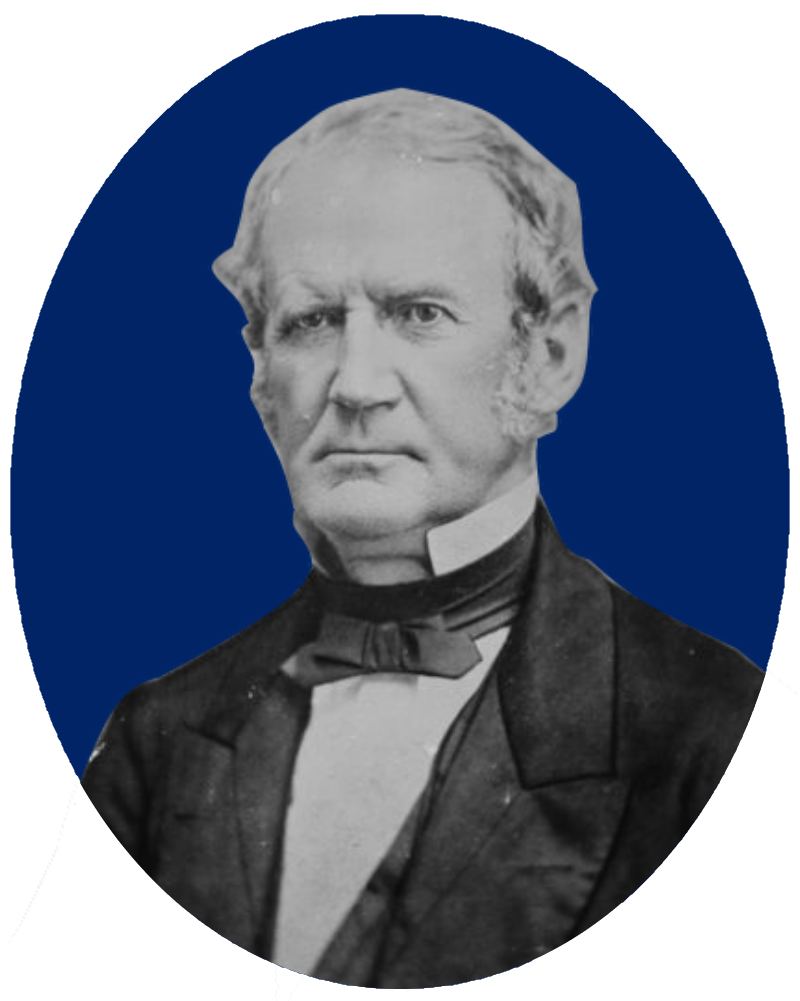
- Nominees; Scott and Graham

Convention
- Dates: June 16–19 & 21, 1852
- City: Baltimore, Maryland
- Venue: Maryland Institute for the Promotion of the Mechanic Arts (now Maryland Institute College of Art)
- Chair: John G. Chapman

Candidates
- Presidential nominee: Winfield Scott of New Jersey
- Vice-presidential nominee: William A. Graham of North Carolina

Voting
- Total delegates: 296
- Votes needed for nomination: 149
- Results (president): Scott (NJ): 159 (53.72%); Fillmore (NY): 112 (37.84%); Webster (MA): 21 (7.09%); Blank: 4 (1.35%)
- Results (vice president): Graham (NC): 296 (100%)
- Ballots: 53

The 1852 Whig National Convention was a presidential nominating convention held from June 16 to June 21, in Baltimore, Maryland. It nominated the Whig Party's candidates for president and vice president in the 1852 election. The convention selected General-in-Chief Winfield Scott (commanding the United States Army and led in the recent war with Mexico) for president and U.S. secretary of the navy William A. Graham for vice president.

In the aftermath of the Mexican–American War (1846–1848) and the Compromise of 1850, the Whig Party was torn over the issue of slavery. President Millard Fillmore, who had succeeded to the presidency in July 1850 after the death of Zachary Taylor, had the strong backing of Southern Whigs. However, his enforcement of the Fugitive Slave Act of 1850 had alienated many Northern Whigs, who supported either Scott or secretary of state Daniel Webster. Scott and Fillmore essentially tied on the first presidential ballot, while a smaller fraction of the vote went to Webster. There was little delegate movement over the next 46 ballots, but Scott gained momentum on the 48th ballot and clinched the nomination on the 53rd ballot.

Graham, Edward Bates of Missouri, and James Pearce of Maryland all won significant support on the first vice presidential ballot, but Graham clinched the nomination on the second ballot. In the general election, Scott and Graham were defeated by the Democratic candidates, Franklin Pierce and William R. King, who took office the following March 1853. This 1852 convention was the last Whig Party presidential convention to be held independent of other parties, as the 1856 Whig National Convention was held by a rump faction of Whigs and nominated the ticket previously selected by the competing 1856 American National Convention.

== Schedule ==
The congressional Whig caucus, led by Senator Willie P. Mangum, a supporter of Scott, met on April 9, 1852, to decide the date and location for the 1852 convention. The party chose to hold the convention in Baltimore, Maryland, at the Maryland Institute Hall, from June 16 to 21. The convention was temporarily chaired by George C. Evans and permanently chaired by John G. Chapman.

== Pre-convention ==
In late 1851 and early 1852, state conventions began to meet to select delegates to the national convention. The party was split between those who felt that Fillmore could not win the election and those who favored the president's nomination. Northern Whigs favored Scott while Southern Whigs tended to prefer Fillmore.

The party was also torn on the issue of slavery. Most in the party wanted to prevent slavery from becoming the dominating issue in the election. However, the Whigs were split on the issue of the Compromise of 1850, proposed and designed by Whig senator Henry Clay of Kentucky. President Zachary Taylor, a Southern Whig, had tried to avoid the issue altogether by proposing that California and New Mexico be admitted as free states immediately. After Taylor's death in July 1850, Fillmore, a moderate Whig, had supported Clay's compromise and was instrumental as president in its passage. Northern Whigs, led by William Henry Seward of New York, (a former governor and senator), adamantly opposed the compromise because it did not apply the Wilmot Proviso (which banned slavery in any federal territory acquired from Mexico after the Mexican–American War) to the western territories.

Northern Whigs launched an effort to associate Scott with the Free Soil wing of the party. Scott did not agree with the Free Soilers, who opposed the expansion of slavery into the western territories. Just days before the convention was scheduled to begin, Southern Whigs warned that they would not support Scott unless he pledged to disavow the Free Soilers and to exclude them from his administration if he was elected.

Encouraged by Fillmore's professed lack of desire to pursue the Whig nomination, Webster launched another campaign for the presidency in 1851. Fillmore was sympathetic to the ambitions of his secretary of state, but he was unwilling to completely rule out accepting the party's 1852 nomination, as he feared doing so would allow Seward to gain control of the party through Scott. Scott had supported the Compromise of 1850, but his association with Seward made him unacceptable to Southern Whigs. As Southerners retained a lingering distrust of Webster, they threw their backing behind Fillmore. Thus, Scott emerged as the preferred candidate of most Northern Whigs, Fillmore became the main candidate of Southern Whigs, and Webster was only able to win backing from a handful of delegates, most of whom were from New England.

On the eve of the convention, The New York Times estimated that Fillmore would have the support of 133 delegates, Scott 120 and Webster 40.

Two weeks before the Whig convention was set to begin, the Democrats nominated Franklin Pierce, a northerner from New Hampshire. Supporters of Webster in the North decided that Scott, not Fillmore, could defeat Pierce in the general election, and several switched their support.

== The convention ==
The convention met from June 17 to June 20.

=== Day 1 ===
Delegates to the fourth Whig Party National Convention assembled also in the same Maryland Institute auditorium, above "Centre Market" at Market Place/South Frederick and East Baltimore Streets, alongside the Jones Falls stream in eastern downtown Baltimore, Maryland. Although each state was granted one delegate for each of their electoral votes, several sent more than their allotted number.

The convention convened on June 17, 15 minutes before the scheduled time. Delegates quickly selected former senator George Evans of Maine as temporary chairman. Because a large number of delegates had not yet arrived, many on the floor objected to the selection. The delegates also appointed the Whig Party's National Committee, as well as a Committee on Credentials and a Committee on Permanent Organization, before adjourning.

An evening session was held later in the day. The Credentials Committee submitted a report which was adopted and the Committee on Permanent Organization was assembled.

=== Day 2 ===
The second day began with the organization of the convention. Several states had sent delegations that far outnumbered their allowed size. Virginia was allotted 15 votes and sent 45 delegates. Delegates voted to restrict states to one delegate for each of its electoral votes. The convention also adopted the party's platform. Southern delegates submitted a platform, but it was rejected in favor of a relatively weak one which caused little controversy and was easily passed by a vote of 227 to 66.

== Presidential nomination ==
=== Presidential candidates ===
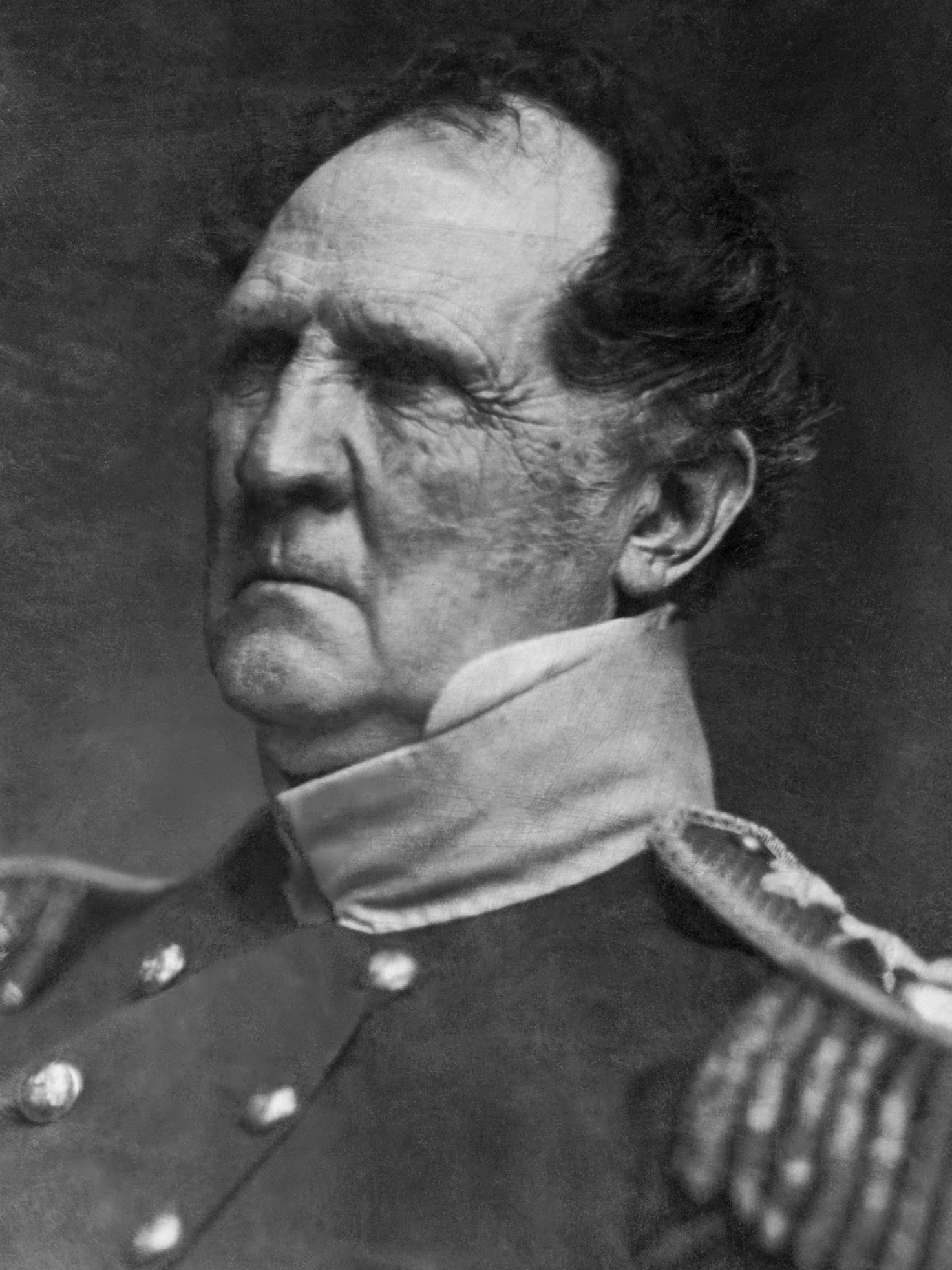
Commanding General
Winfield Scott
from New Jersey

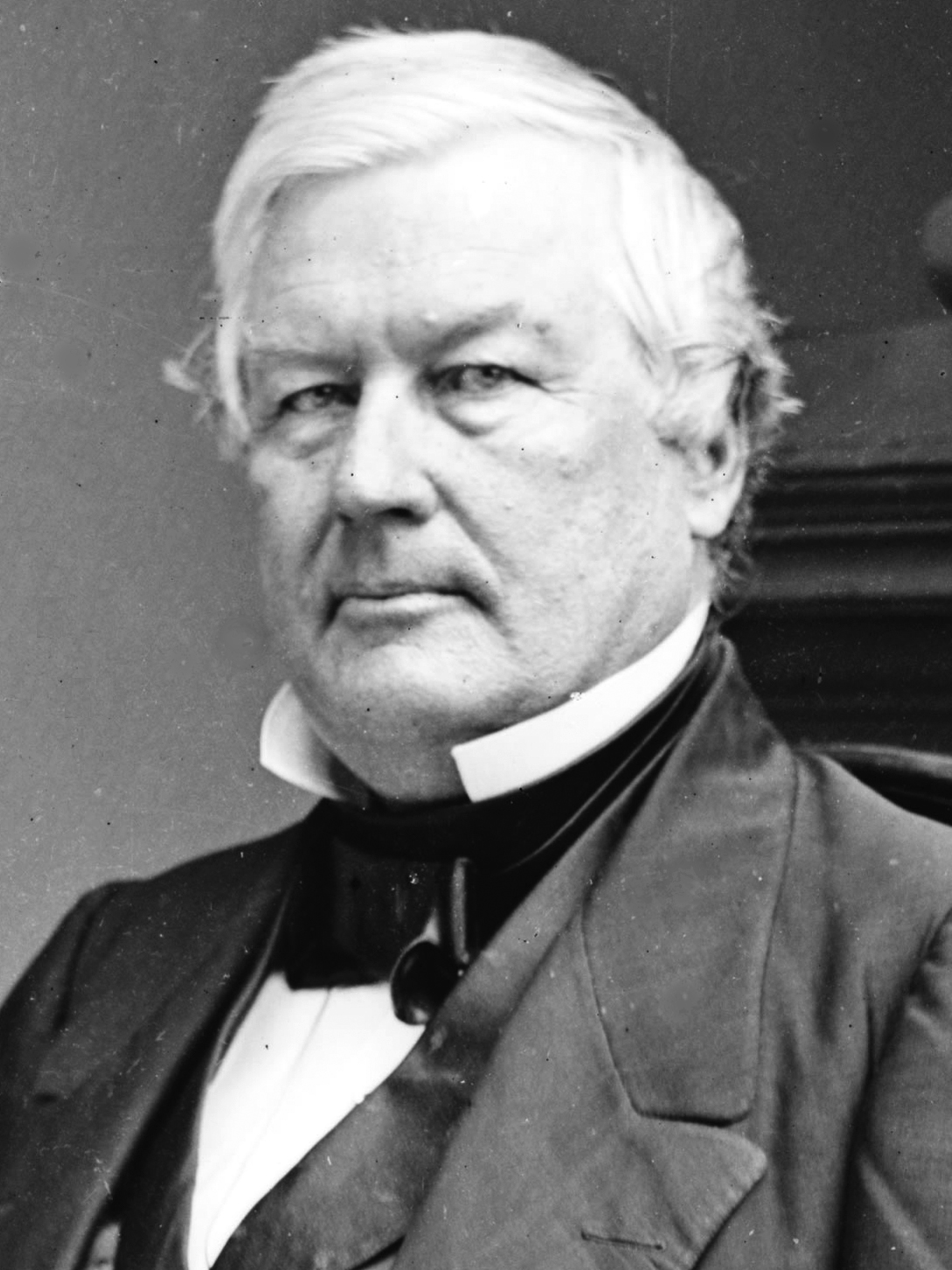
President
Millard Fillmore of New York

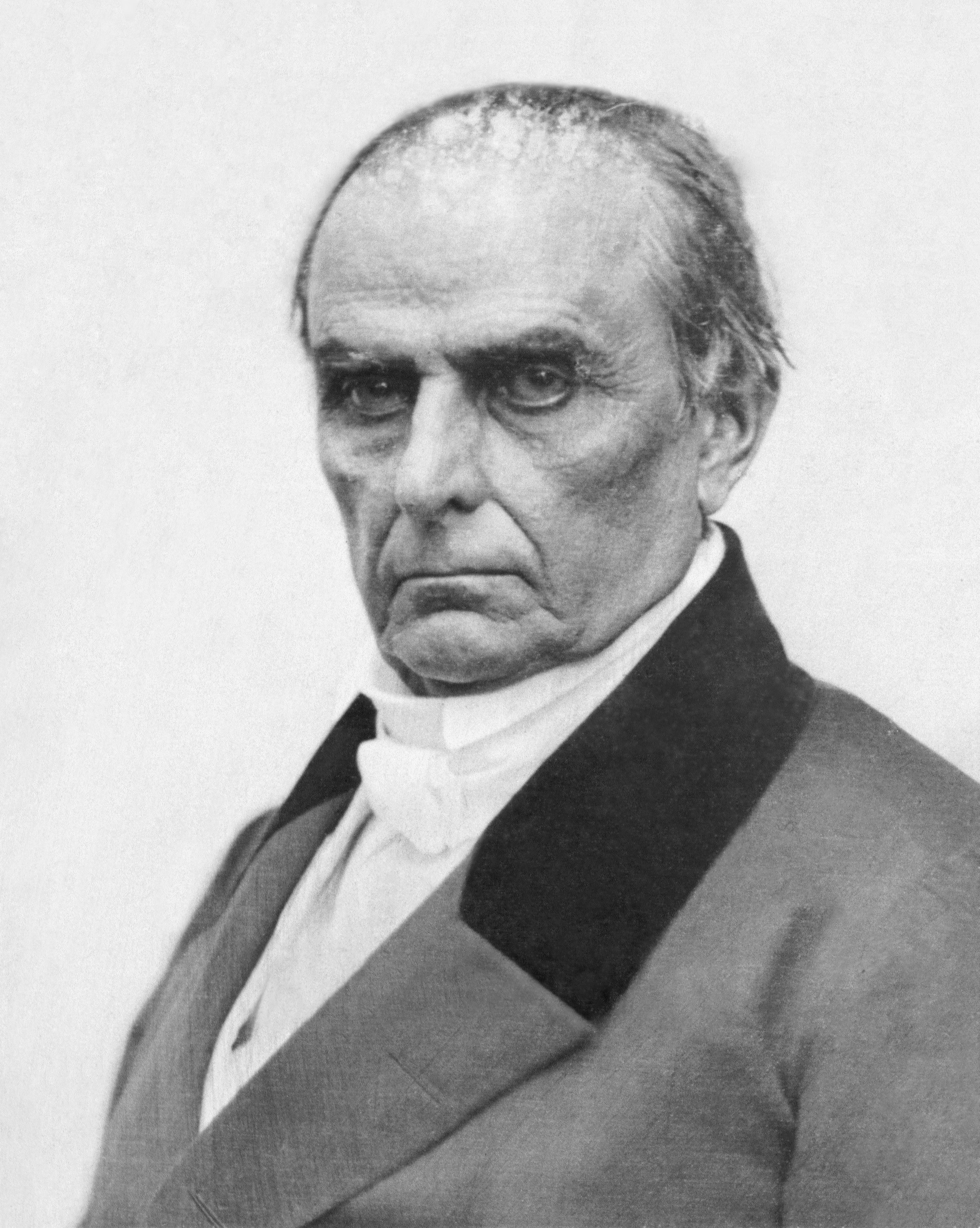
Secretary of State
Daniel Webster
of Massachusetts

The divided convention began the process of nominating a candidate. Fillmore led on the first ballot, receiving 133 votes. Scott placed a close second with 131 votes. Webster received 29 votes. Five more ballots were held with little change in the vote before the convention adjourned for the weekend.

Although both Webster and Fillmore were willing to withdraw in favor of the other, their respective delegates at the convention were unable to unite around either candidate during the weekend adjournment.

The delegates resumed voting on Monday. On the 8th ballot, Scott took the lead with 133 votes to 131 for Fillmore, but neither received the necessary majority for nomination. The convention was deadlocked, and a number of delegates unsuccessfully moved to allow a nomination with a plurality, rather than a majority, of votes. After the 46th ballot, with Scott ahead by seven votes (but still without a majority), the delegates voted to adjourn for the night. On the first ballot of the final day of the convention, the 47th overall, Scott still had not received the majority of votes necessary for nomination. Several more votes were taken. Fillmore lost votes on each successive ballot. On the 52nd ballot, Scott received exactly half of the vote. Scott was finally nominated on the next ballot, obtaining a majority when several delegates from New England and Virginia switched their support.

Presidential Ballot
Ballot	1st	2nd	3rd	4th	5th	6th	7th	8th	9th	10th	11th	12th	13th	14th	15th	16th	17th	18th	19th	20th	21st	22nd	23rd	24th	25th	26th	27th
Scott	131	133	133	134	130	131	131	133	133	135	134	134	134	133	133	135	132	132	132	132	133	132	132	133	133	134	135
Fillmore	133	131	131	130	133	133	133	131	131	130	131	130	130	130	130	129	131	131	131	131	131	130	130	129	128	128	128
Webster	29	29	29	29	30	29	28	28	29	28	28	28	28	29	29	28	29	28	29	29	28	30	30	30	31	30	29
Crittenden	0	0	0	0	0	0	0	0	0	0	0	0	0	0	0	0	0	1	0	0	0	0	0	0	0	0	0
Bates	0	0	0	0	0	0	1	1	0	0	0	0	0	0	0	0	0	0	0	0	0	0	0	0	0	0	0
Douglas	0	0	0	0	0	0	0	0	0	0	0	0	0	0	0	0	0	0	0	0	0	0	0	0	0	0	0
Choate	0	0	0	0	0	0	0	0	0	0	0	0	0	0	0	0	0	0	0	0	0	0	0	0	0	0	0
Blank	3	3	3	3	3	3	3	3	3	3	3	4	4	4	4	4	4	4	4	4	4	4	4	4	4	4	4

Presidential Ballot
Ballot	28th	29th	30th	31st	32nd	33rd	34th	35th	36th	37th	38th	39th	40th	41st	42nd	43rd	44th	45th	46th	47th	48th	49th	50th	51st	52nd	53rd
Scott	134	134	134	134	134	134	134	134	133	136	136	134	134	132	134	134	133	133	134	135	139	139	142	142	148	159
Fillmore	128	128	128	128	128	128	126	128	128	127	127	128	128	128	128	128	129	127	127	127	125	122	123	121	118	112
Webster	30	30	29	30	30	29	28	28	29	28	29	30	29	32	30	30	30	32	31	30	27	30	27	28	25	21
Crittenden	0	0	0	0	0	1	4	1	1	0	0	0	0	0	0	0	0	0	0	0	0	0	0	0	0	1
Bates	0	0	0	0	0	0	0	1	1	0	0	0	0	0	0	0	0	0	0	0	0	0	0	0	0	0
Douglas	0	0	0	0	0	0	0	0	0	1	0	0	0	0	0	0	0	0	0	0	0	0	0	0	0	0
Choate	0	0	0	0	0	0	0	0	0	0	0	0	1	0	0	0	0	0	0	0	0	0	0	0	0	0
Blank	4	4	5	4	4	4	4	4	4	4	4	4	4	4	4	4	4	4	4	4	5	5	4	5	5	3

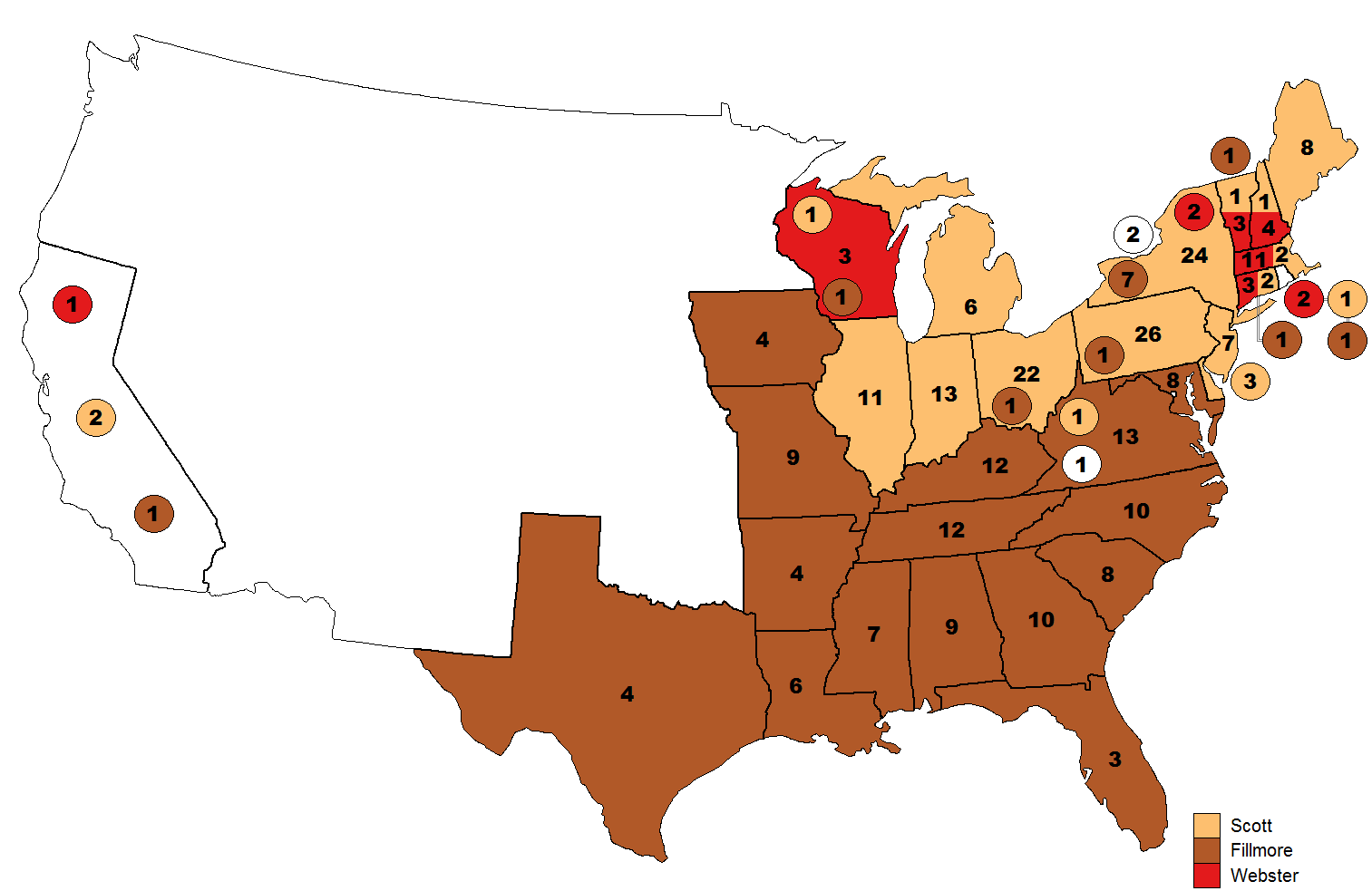
1st presidential ballot (Fillmore's peak)

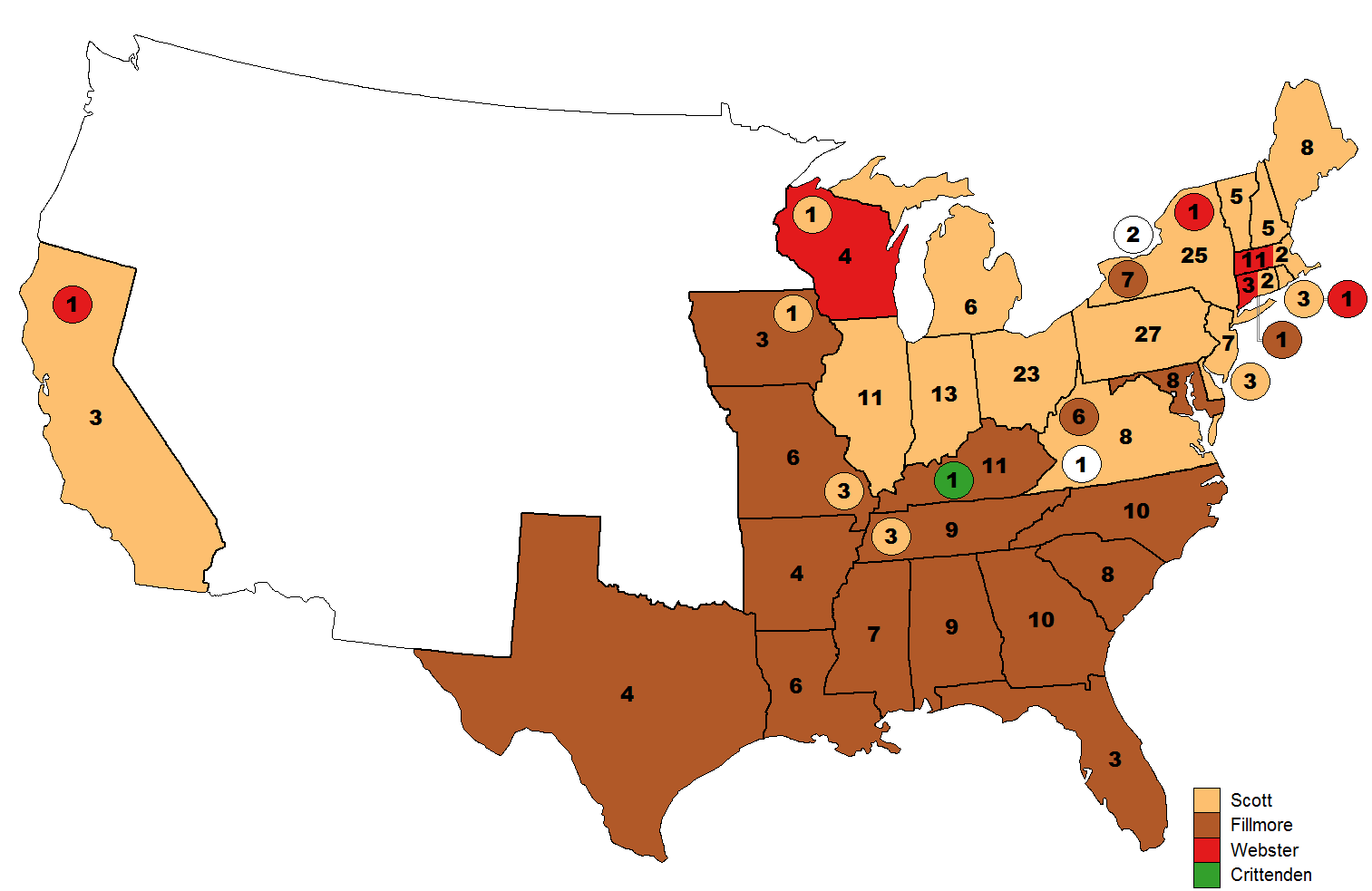
53rd presidential ballot (Scott nominated)

== Vice presidential nomination ==
Observers at the convention noted that "there seemed to be no anxiety to get to the business of selecting the vice-presidential candidate, and when the nominations began, no candidates seemed to want them." While various candidates were informally approached, each refused consideration in turn. Former representative Edward Bates and navy secretary William Alexander Graham were the two main candidates for the nomination. Bates led on the first ballot at the convention and even had an editorial endorsement from a fellow Missourian who was just starting his career, Mark Twain. But Bates' known Free-Soil sentiments were used against him and Graham was selected on the second ballot. Graham accepted the nomination and he was accepted as the party's candidate by Chapman, the convention chairman.

Convention vice presidential vote
Ballots	1	2
William Alexander Graham	69	223
Edward Bates	97	62
James Pearce	42	4
John W. Crockett	19	0
Edward Stanly	14	0
John J. Crittenden	10	0
Willie P. Mangum	10	4
James L. Petigru	8	1
John Bell	5	0
James C. Jones	5	0
Thomas Brown	3	0
Albert G. Williams	3	0
Henry W. Hilliard	2	0
Thomas Pratt	2	0
Alexander Stuart	2	0
D. B. Richardson	1	0
George E. Badger	1	0
William Larimer Jr.	1	0
Not Voting	2	2

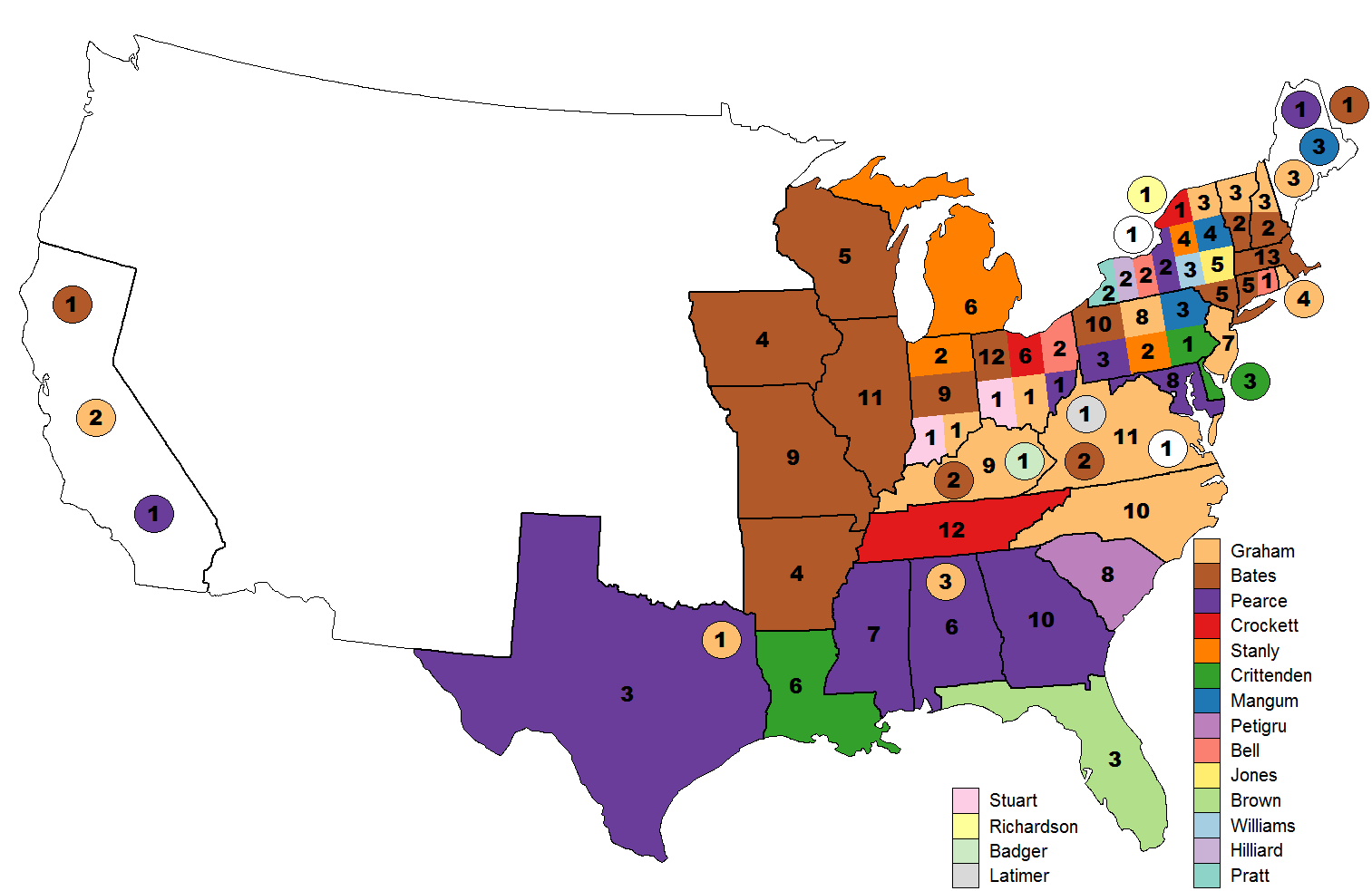
1st vice presidential ballot

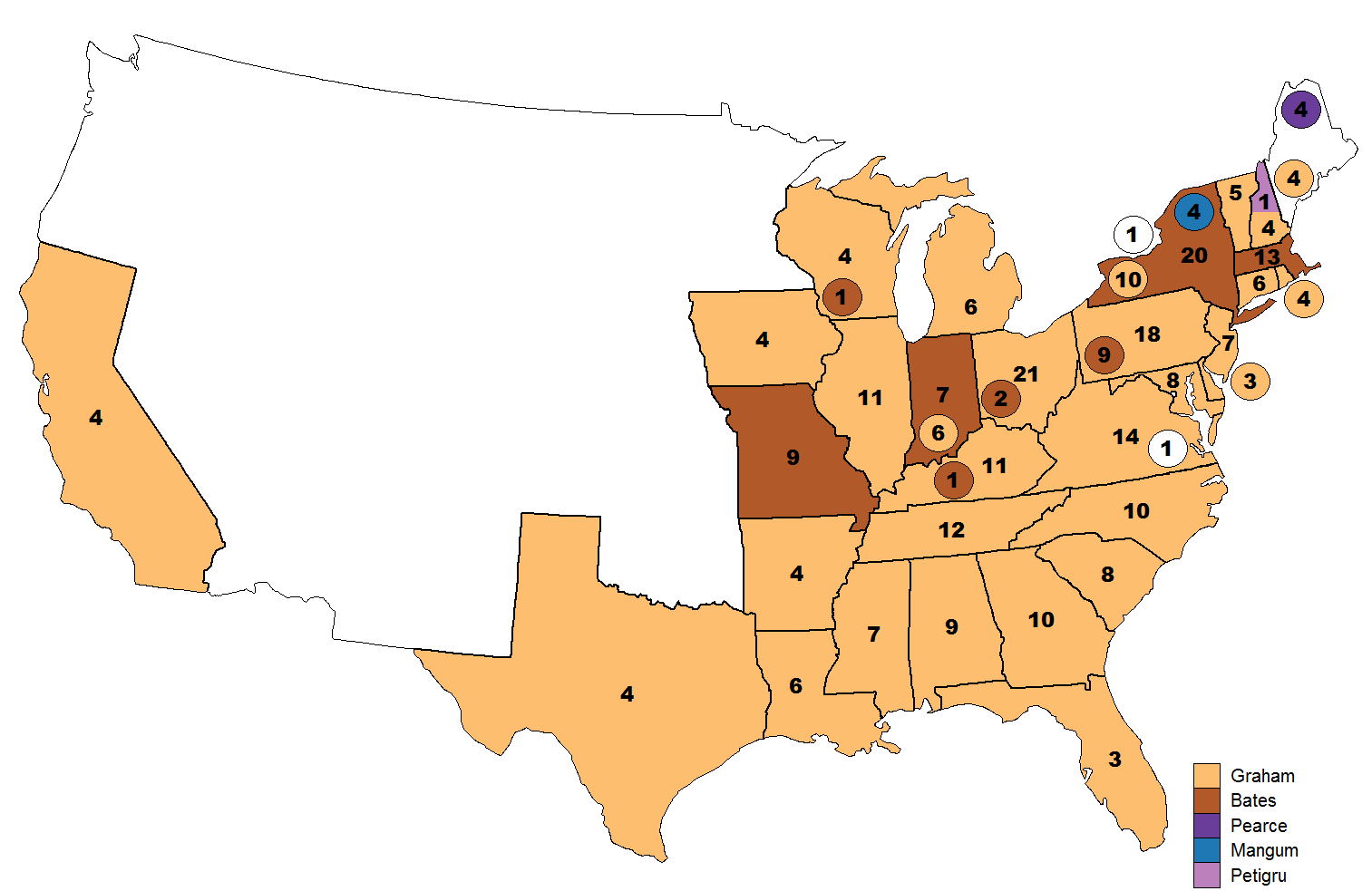
2nd vice presidential ballot

== See also ==
- U.S. presidential nomination convention
- 1852 United States presidential election
- 1852 Democratic National Convention
