= Benjamin E. Bates =

American industrialist and philanthropist (1808–1878)

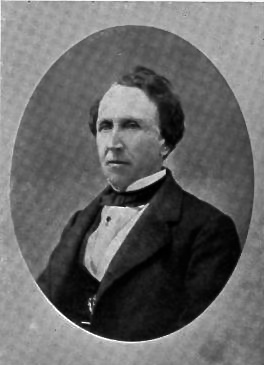
- Born: Benjamin Edward Bates; July 12, 1808; Mansfield, Massachusetts, U.S.
- Died: January 14, 1878 (aged 69); Boston, Massachusetts, U.S.
- Burial place: Mount Auburn Cemetery; Cambridge, Massachusetts, U.S.
- Occupations: Rail industrialist, textile tycoon and philanthropist
- Political party: Republican
- Spouse: Sarah Chapman Gilbert
- Children: Josephine; Benjamin Edward; Sarah; Lillian
- Parents: Hannah Copeland; Elkanah Bates

Benjamin Edward Bates (/beɪtɛs/; July 12, 1808 – January 14, 1878) was an American rail industrialist, textile tycoon, and philanthropist prominent in New England. His financial support and patronage of the Maine State Seminary with Oren Burbank Cheney led to his namesake Bates College being established in Lewiston, Maine in 1855. The Bates Mill was a dominant economic driver of the city for over a century as industrialization swept the region.

Bates was born to a large family in Mansfield, Massachusetts. He moved to Boston to work as a clerk at the dry goods store owned by Barnabas T. Loring until Loring's death in 1835. With partners, he subsequently ran the Davis & Bates, and the Davis, Bates, & Turner firms until 1847. After entering the textile business, he created the Bates Manufacturing Company in Lewiston, building its first mill in 1850. His company quickly became one of the largest employers in Maine. Within the already-extant Lewiston Water Power Company, he oversaw the creation of the first canal waterway in the city.

== Early life and education ==
Benjamin Edward Bates was born in Mansfield, Massachusetts, on July 12, 1808, to Hannah Copeland and Elkanah Bates as their third child (of eight). His father, Elkanah Bates, was a farmer, a cotton manufacturer and prominent merchant. Both of his parents were religious and belonged to the Congregational Church of Mansfield. In 1838, there was a denominational split within the church to create a Unitarian theologian association that questioned the divinity of Christ, and Elkanah Bates was picked to lead the movement. His paternal grandfather fought in the American Revolution as a captain and later became a brigadier general for the Massachusetts state militia. As a boy, Bates worked at the family store, mills, and farms. From this time one of his brothers recounted him being dragged by two horses across "quite a distance" after a harness broke while harrowing in the farm's field. He pulled the horses down and eventually halted their movement, demonstrating "bravery and presence of mind" to quickly bring them under control.

Bates attended the town school until enrolling at the age of 15 at the Wrentham Academy, where he studied from 1823 to 1825. He moved to Boston, Massachusetts, in 1829, at the age of 21. Bates entered the dry goods business with Barnabas T. Loring on Washington Street. At age 24, he made a public profession of Christian faith, and he was a lifelong Congregationalist and temperance supporter. Bates taught Sunday school at several churches in Boston, including Park Street Church, and was later an active member of Central Congregational Church, in Boston.

== Business in Boston ==
=== B. T. Loring & Co. ===
Bates moved to Taunton, Massachusetts, in 1827, and for two years worked in a grocery store and a dry goods store. Upon moving to Boston in 1829 he obtained work as a clerk for Barnabas T. Loring dry goods store on Washington Street. Sometime in 1830, Loring brought in John G. Davis, a man around the same age as Bates, to become another clerk in the store. According to Davis, Loring reorganized the firm as B. T. Loring & Company, with Bates and Davis as partners. Davis also recalled that Bates's net worth was at $700, similar to his own, perhaps meaning that Loring was putting great trust into partners who were not wealthy men. The two junior partners also convinced Loring to move from retail business into wholesale and moved the business to Central Street, near Merchant's Row. Loring died in 1835, but had been ill enough earlier that he became less involved, and the group had already dissolved B. T. Loring & Co. and created Davis & Bates.

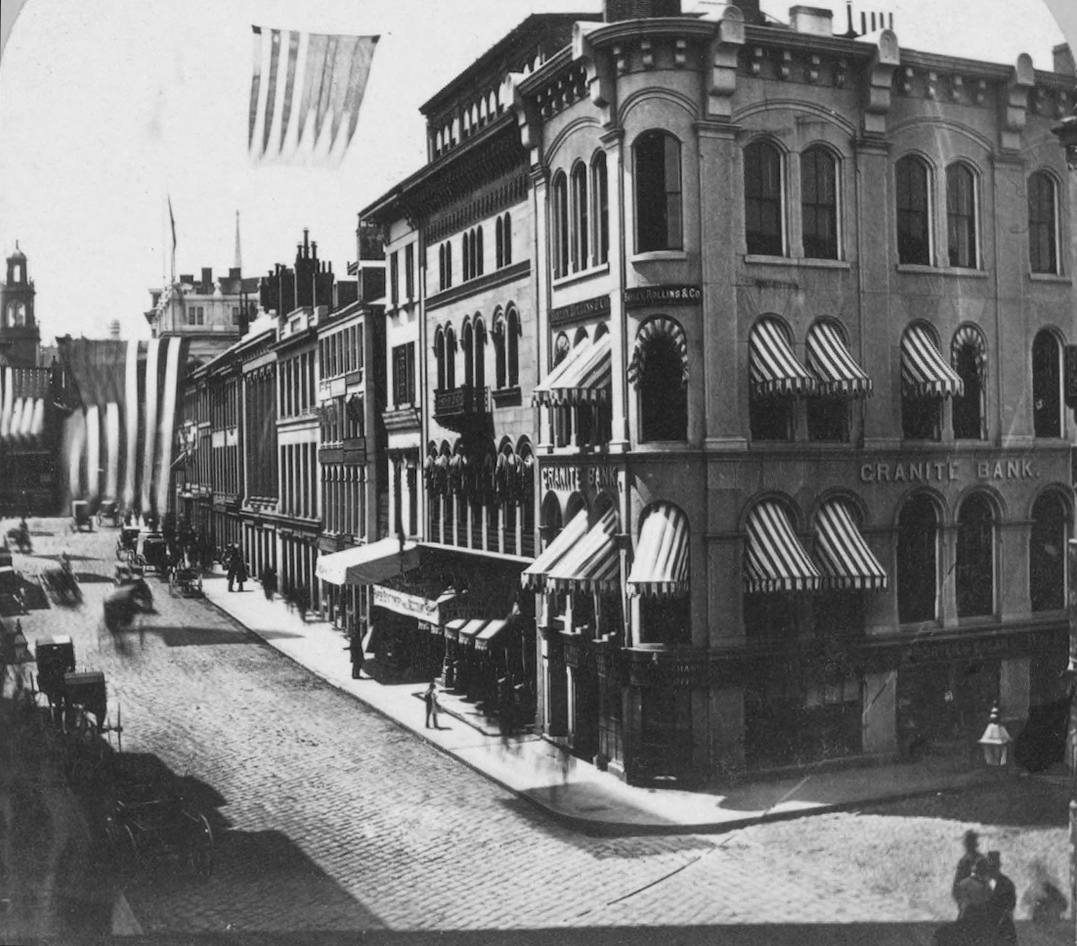
Merchant's Row, Boston, corner of State Street. Central Street runs parallel to State, one block away.

=== Davis, Bates & Turner ===
The firm enjoyed financial success as its previous deals had garnered high standing among the mercantile community of Boston and across New England. With the firm on stable footing, the two partners brought in John N. Turner, who had been a local lawyer, to join the firm. As a mutual friend of Bates, and with his background in law, he was tasked with bookkeeping and legal relations. The firm was renamed Davis, Bates & Turner and continued to prosper until 1837.

=== Financial panic of 1837 and after ===
Like other businesses in Boston, the firm suffered under the Panic of 1837, which caused numerous firms all over New England to fail, and Davis, Bates & Turner were "several times reported on the list of failures." The firm only survived largely because of its good credit and the positive relations with other businessmen and bankers in the city. When word was received from New York banks that the worst of the crisis appeared to be over, one unnamed local businessman wrote about the relief felt by the business community upon hearing the news:

I was present at the meeting, and the scene I shall never forget. Men acted more like children than like themselves. They laughed, they cried, they threw up their hands. Some there were, who, to my knowledge, would not speak to each other on the street. But at this meeting all differences seemed to be forgotten.

Describing a meeting of local magnates during the midst of the Panic, a prominent lawyer, Homer Bartlett, was later asked "Who was the strongest man in that meeting?" His reply was "Benjamin Bates. Benjamin Bates was the strongest man there." The firm would survive the Panic, and moved in 1840 to Water Street, and again in 1845 to Milk Street. That year, John Davis withdrew from the firm due to illness. Stiles Bascom was brought in as a new partner, and the firm renamed to Bates, Turner & Co. Bascom died in 1847, and the firm was dissolved.

From the 1850s, at least, until the end of his life, Bates became involved as a shareholder and trustee of the Union Pacific Railroad, and was either a trustee, director of, or advisor to numerous other firms, including the National Bank of Commerce in Boston, the North American Insurance Company, the Clearing House Association, Merchants' National Bank, and the Washington National Bank.

== Business Interests in Lewiston ==
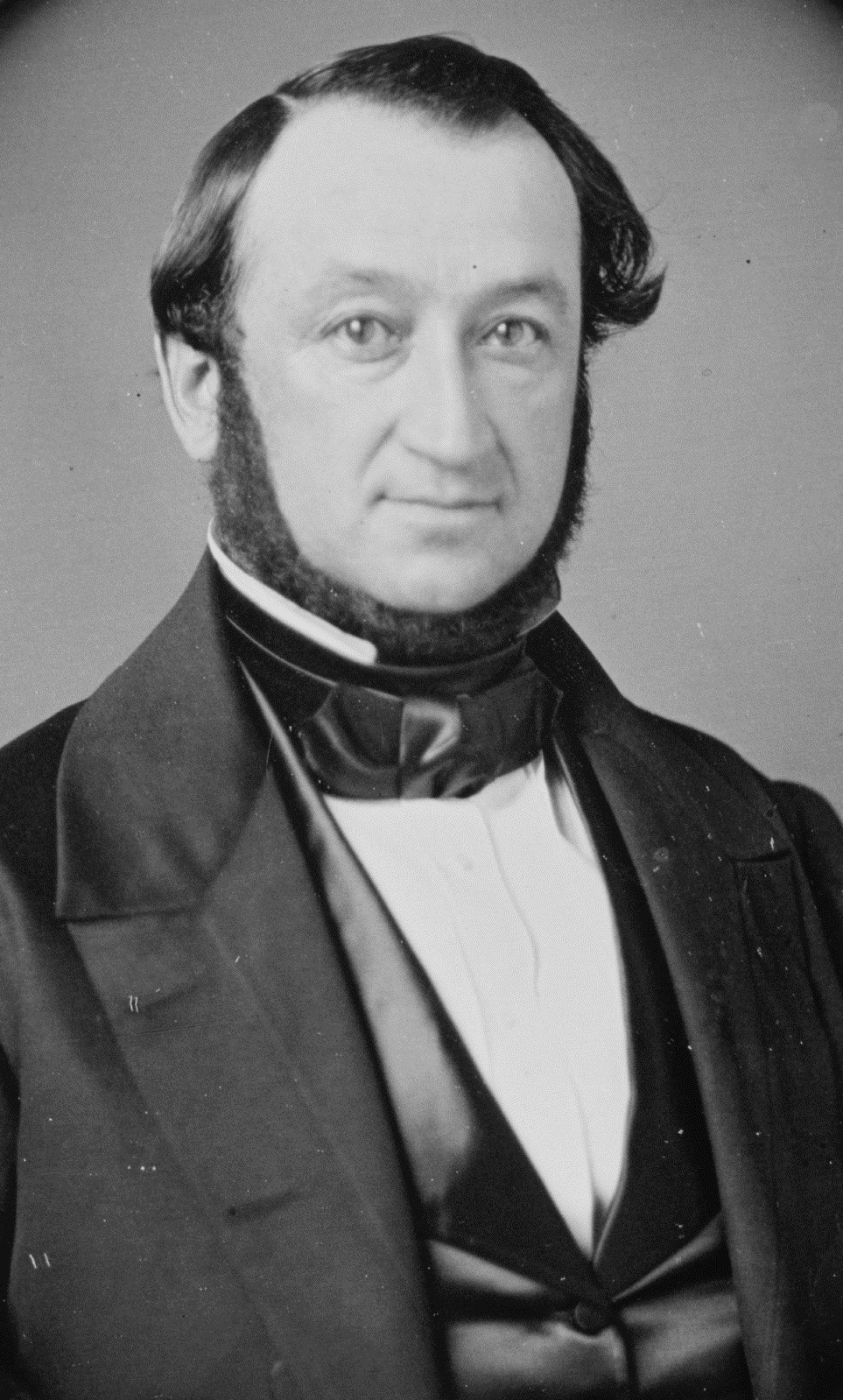
Alexander De Witt advised Bates on development strategy in Lewiston.

In 1836, local businessmen (chief among them Edward Little) in Lewiston and Auburn created the Great Androscoggin Falls, Dam, Lock, and Canal Company, in order to harness the power of the Androscoggin River for making textiles. To this end, they created plans for canals, dams, and mill sites, and sought to acquire the rights to water power in the area. By 1845, lacking enough capital for their plans, they re-incorporated as the Lewiston Water Power Company and began selling stock in Boston. Upon the advisement of his friend Alexander De Witt, Bates traveled to Lewiston in 1847 to inspect the area's potential for himself. Impressed with what he saw, Bates invested his own money, and was able to solicit funds from others in Boston, including De Witt, Thomas J. Hill, Lyman Nichols, George L. Ward, Francis Skinner, and Homer Bartlett.

The Lewiston Water Power Company ran into trouble by 1856, finding itself overextended due having spent large amounts of money on buying land in Lewiston, and that the shareholders had voted themselves a large dividend. Facing a lack of capital, the directors voted to dissolve the company and re-organize as a new corporation, the Franklin Water Power Company (often referred to simply as the "Franklin Company"). All of the former Lewiston Water Power Company stock and assets were sold to this new organization, and the directors—Bates included—carried on as before.

=== Bates Manufacturing Company ===
By 1850, the Lewiston Water Power Company had secured water power rights along the Androscoggin, and had bought up much of the land on which central Lewiston would be built. Canals had been dug to redirect water for future industrial development. Major Power Company owners such as Bates and Hill began leasing parcels of this land on which they would build their new mills. The Bates Manufacturing Company was incorporated in 1850, and the first mill (Bates No. 1) began operating in 1852.

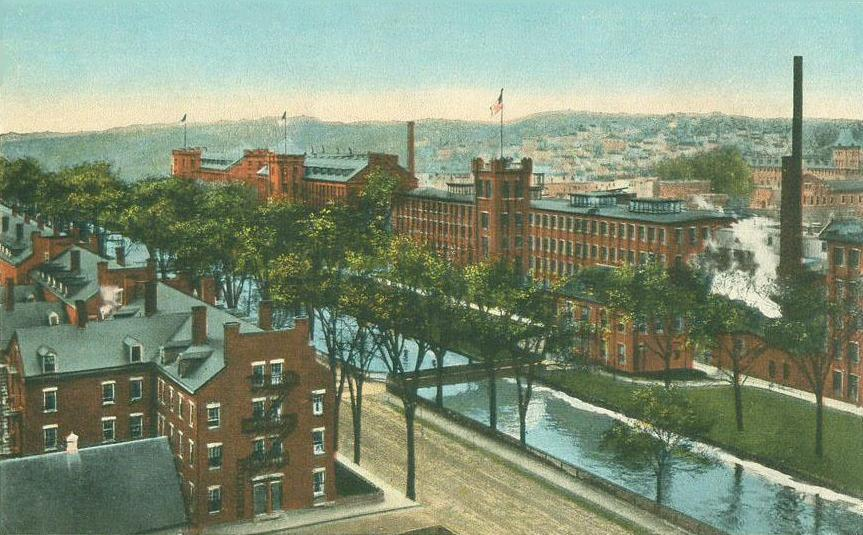
Bates Mill No. 1 and Canal, circa 1890s

In its first year of operation, the Bates Company netted a profit of $33,000. By 1856, with a second mill now running, company profits had risen to over $112,000. City tax records also show that the following year, the Company's tax bill amounted to a quarter of all taxes paid to the city. The Panic of 1857 staggered the Company somewhat, reducing profits to under $2,000 and resulting in the layoff of three-quarters of its one thousand employees, but with the return of prosperity (and jobs), by 1860 the Company was earning profits over $200,000. At the start of the Civil War, the mill owners in Lewiston bought up as much cotton as they could, gambling on a long war. (Cotton prices in 1861 were twelve cents a pound; by 1865 the price was over a dollar a pound.) Other mills in the country, including direct competitors in Lowell, Massachusetts, did not, and the result was that these companies either shut down or ran at greatly reduced capacities during the war. Even running at three-quarters capacity, annual profits at the Bates mills soared to over $500,000 by the war's end.

By the time of Bates' death in 1878, the Bates Manufacturing Company was operating three mills, employing over a thousand people, and producing "over 800 different styles" of fabric. Industry in Lewiston had grown as well, and by the turn of the century had seen the creation of other mills and textile-related businesses: The Hill, Lincoln, Androscoggin, Cowan, Continental, and Cumberland mills, and the Lewiston Bleachery and Dye Works. By 1900 over 70% of Lewiston's work force was engaged in the textile industry.

== Financial Issues ==
=== Maine State Seminary and Bates College ===
With his substantial business interests in Lewiston, Bates must have been familiar with the newly-created Maine State Seminary, which was established in 1855 and began operations in 1857. Although it is uncertain as to when Bates first met the Seminary founder (and first President) Oren B. Cheney, by 1862 Bates was supportive enough of Cheney and the institution that he donated $25,000 to the school that January. In 1863 when the Seminary Trustees were seeking a collegiate charter from the state of Maine, Cheney and the Trustees voted to name the school after Bates. Writing later on the subject, Cheney offered:

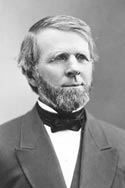
Oren Burbank Cheney, 1907

He [Bates] was never consulted as to the name...Neither did he know what the name was to be until the question was decided. Then he wrote me these words. They are under date of May 18, 1863: "In regard to the name of your College I can only say my choice is that it should have some more worthy name than the one suggested." And after the Trustees, by a unanimous vote, had asked the Legislature to change the name of Maine State Seminary to that of Bates College, the next time I met him he said, "I am sorry the Trustees have named the College after me, for now I cannot raise it so much money, as people may think I am asking money for myself - and yet I feel I have been greatly honored by the action of the Board."

Nevertheless, Bates made another pledge to the College in 1868, this one for $75,000. His third and final pledge, made in 1873, would have been for $100,000, subject to the condition that the College Trustees raised a matching amount within five years of the February 21st date on which it was made. Bates, however, died before the five-year period was complete, and the executors of his estate claimed that the College had not met the terms of the final donation, and did not honor Bates' final pledge. The College sued the Bates estate in 1881 in the Massachusetts Supreme Judicial Court, claiming the terms of the donation had been met, but lost the case and never received the final $100,000.

=== Financial condition ===
After his death in 1878, the terms of his will became public. In his will, Bates had left over $1.5 million dollars in cash and property to members of his immediate and extended family, as well as an additional $200,000 to be held in trust for his executors to distribute "to [charities] as they shall think would best conform to his [Bates'] wishes."

However, at was discovered at the same time that Bates had over $200,000 in outstanding debt, in the form of loans taken out from the Bates Manufacturing Company, as well as the outstanding pledge of $100,000 to Bates College. As Bates had been the treasurer of the Company, questions of financial impropriety were raised, but the Company directors denied this and later reported no major financial or business woes. Newspapers reported that the estate did appear to be solvent, later reports surfaced that business losses and stock declines had left the estate nearly insolvent, until some stocks rebounded in value.

== Death and legacy ==
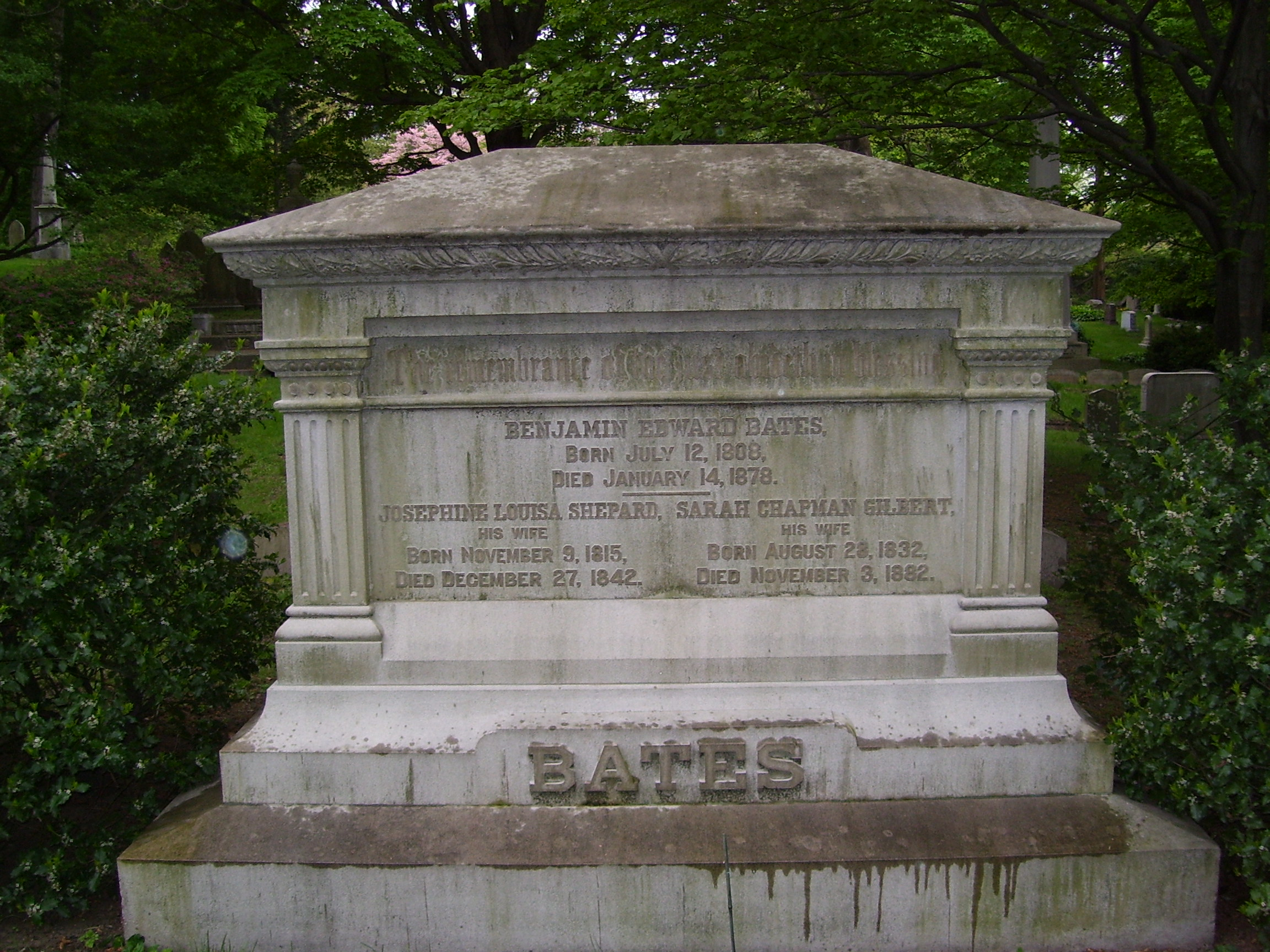
Bates's grave at the Mount Auburn Cemetery in Cambridge, Massachusetts, 2008

Benjamin Bates died on January 14, 1878, at age 69, in Boston, Massachusetts. His body was entombed at the Mount Auburn Cemetery on Fir Avenue in Cambridge, Massachusetts, two days later.

His funeral was attended by Lewiston, Boston, and New York City elite, and the mayors of numerous cities gave speeches on his life. A memorial service in Lewiston was held in the City Hall on June 24, 1878, and clergymen and Bates president Oren B. Cheney gave speeches on his character and commitment to the college and the city.

Bates Street, West Bates Street, and East Bates Street in Lewiston and Auburn, Maine, respectively, are named in his honor.

Bates' first wife was Josephine Louisa Shepard (1815-1842). They were married in 1835 until her death. Bates and Sarah Chapman Gilbert (1832-1882, and the daughter of Joseph Gilbert, niece of Abijah Gilbert) were married in 1860. She survived him. He was also survived by his four children:

- Josephine Bates Hammond (1839–1886)
- Benjamin Edward Bates (1863–1906)
- Sarah Frances Bates Herschel (1867–1937)
- Lillian Gilbert Bates (1872–1951)

Bates College's president Oren Burbank Cheney said the following of Bates in delivering his eulogy:

Bates wanted labor for our laborers, education for our children, places of worship for our worshipers, light for our streets, water for our houses, and a hospital for our sick and our dying. I have frequently heard him say that he would not knowingly do anything against the interests of this people; and that he would sooner invest ten dollars in Lewiston than one dollar in any other place. "I love Lewiston," "I love the College," he was accustomed to say.

Some years later, in his annual report to the Trustees of Bates College, Cheney also wrote:

The late Hon. Benjamin E. Bates, of Boston, was the founder of Lewiston. He was a true, honest, Christian gentleman. He was a friend of the churches of Lewiston, or her public schools, and of every movement that tended to build up a moral and Christian city. He loved the city to the day of his death.
